= Thomas McNaught =

English filmmaker

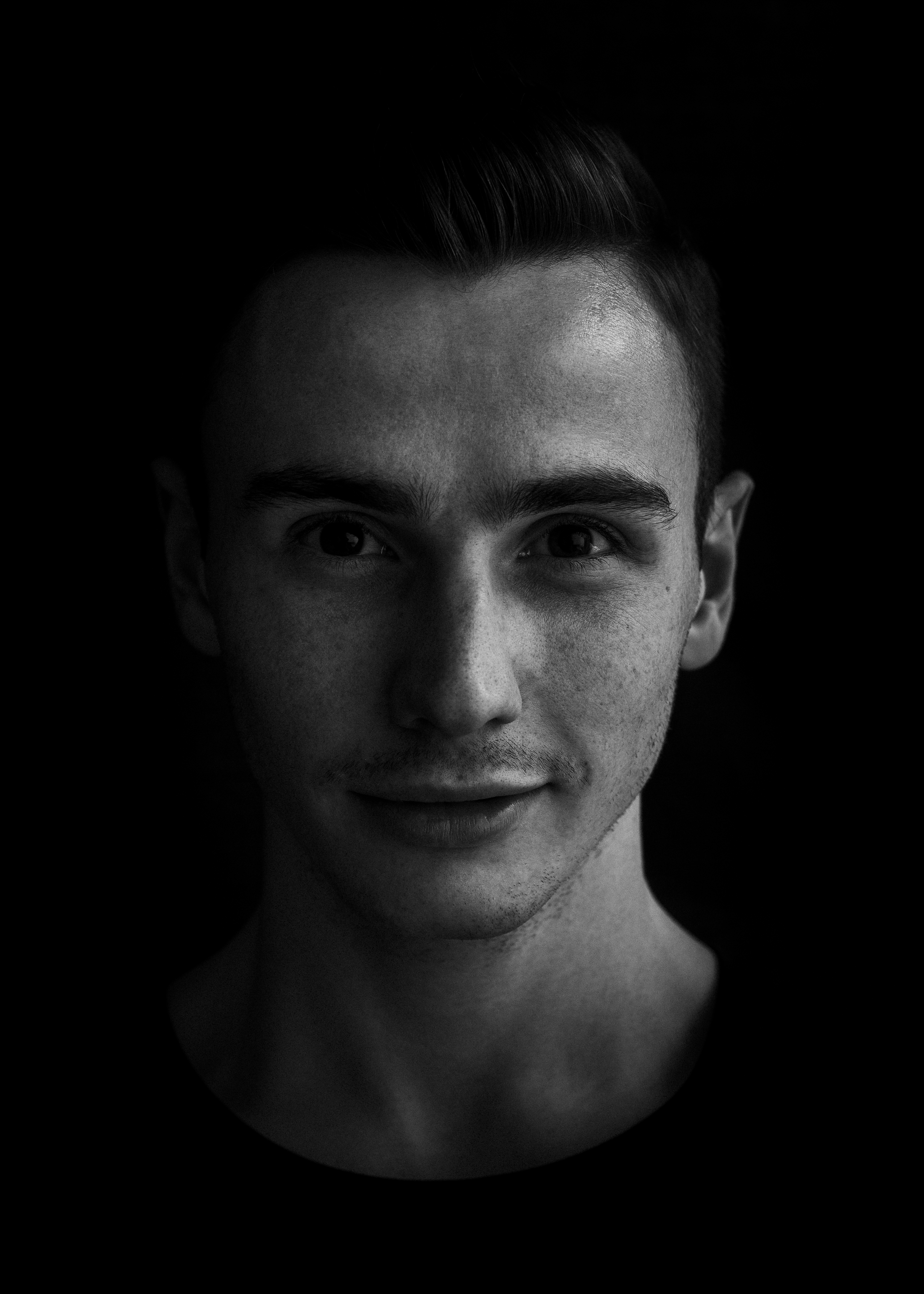
- Born: Thomas Anthony McNaught; 26 July 1993 (age 32); Stoneycroft, Merseyside, England, UK
- Occupations: Filmmaker, writer, director, editor
- Years active: 2014–present
- Notable work: England is Mine Alice: Ignorance is Bliss The Voorman Problem
- Website: thomasmcnaught.co.uk

Thomas McNaught (born 26 July 1993) is an English filmmaker from Liverpool, England. His first notable project is his BBC Three Fresh featured short documentary Alice: Ignorance is Bliss, which follows the relationship between his 84-year-old dementia suffering grandmother and himself. It was nominated for Best British Short Film at the 28th Leeds International Film Festival, where it received a special mention.

Since 2011, McNaught has twice collaborated with Mark Gill and Baldwin Li of Honlodge Productions, providing unit videography for their BAFTA and Oscar-nominated short film The Voorman Problem as well as their first feature film England is Mine, a biopic following the early life of Steven Patrick Morrissey, frontman of The Smiths.

== Filmography ==
Year	Film	Director	Role(s)
2011	The Voorman Problem (short film)	Mark Gill	Unit Videographer
2014	Alice: Ignorance is Bliss (documentary short)	Thomas McNaught	Cinematographer, Editor
2015	Surgery (short)	George Clemens, Samuel Clemens	Second Assistant Camera
2015	Wonder Boy (short)	Ben Molyneux-Chan	Cinematographer, Colorist
2016	Where The Devil Says Goodnight(short)	David Short, Jonathan Tyler	Cinematographer, Colorist
2016	Never Land (short)	Anna Hoghton	Title Production
2016	Circular Cellular (documentary short)	Edward Scott-Clarke	Colorist
2017	England is Mine	Mark Gill	Unit Videographer, Title Production
2017	The Stroke	Morgane Polanski	Second Assistant Camera
2017	Greener Pastures	Alexandria Doyle	Cinematographer, Colorist
