= Baldwin Li =

English film producer

- Born: Manchester, United Kingdom
- Education: Balliol College, Oxford
- Occupation: Film producer
- Years active: 2006–present

Baldwin Li (born March 1982) is an English film producer from Manchester, United Kingdom.

After studying English at Balliol College, Oxford University, Baldwin went on to work at Granada Studios as a sound engineer and cameraman. Upon leaving Granada Studios in 2006, Li founded his production company Honlodge Productions.

In 2011—alongside film director Mark Gill—Li co-wrote, produced, and co-edited the BAFTA and Academy Award-nominated The Voorman Problem, starring Martin Freeman and Tom Hollander.

His determination to create then led to the production of 2017 Morrissey biopic England is Mine starring Jodie Comer and Jack Lowden. England is Mine, Li's first feature in collaboration with Gill, premiered at the closing gala of Edinburgh International Film Festival on 2 July 2017.

In 2024, Li was credited as an executive producer on Ravens, a dark fantasy love story of legendary Japanese photographer Masahisa Fukase and his wife Yoko, written and directed by Mark Gill.

Li is currently acting as a Producing Tutor at MET Film School Manchester, using his industry experience to guide a new generation of filmmakers.

== Filmography ==
- 2008 – 25Gs
- 2011 – The Voorman Problem
- 2013 – Full Time
- 2017 – England is Mine
- 2019 - What Is Your Name
- 2022 - Romeo vs. Juliet
- 2023 - Midnight Whispers
- 2024 - Ravens
