= Sam Clemmett =

British actor (born 1993)

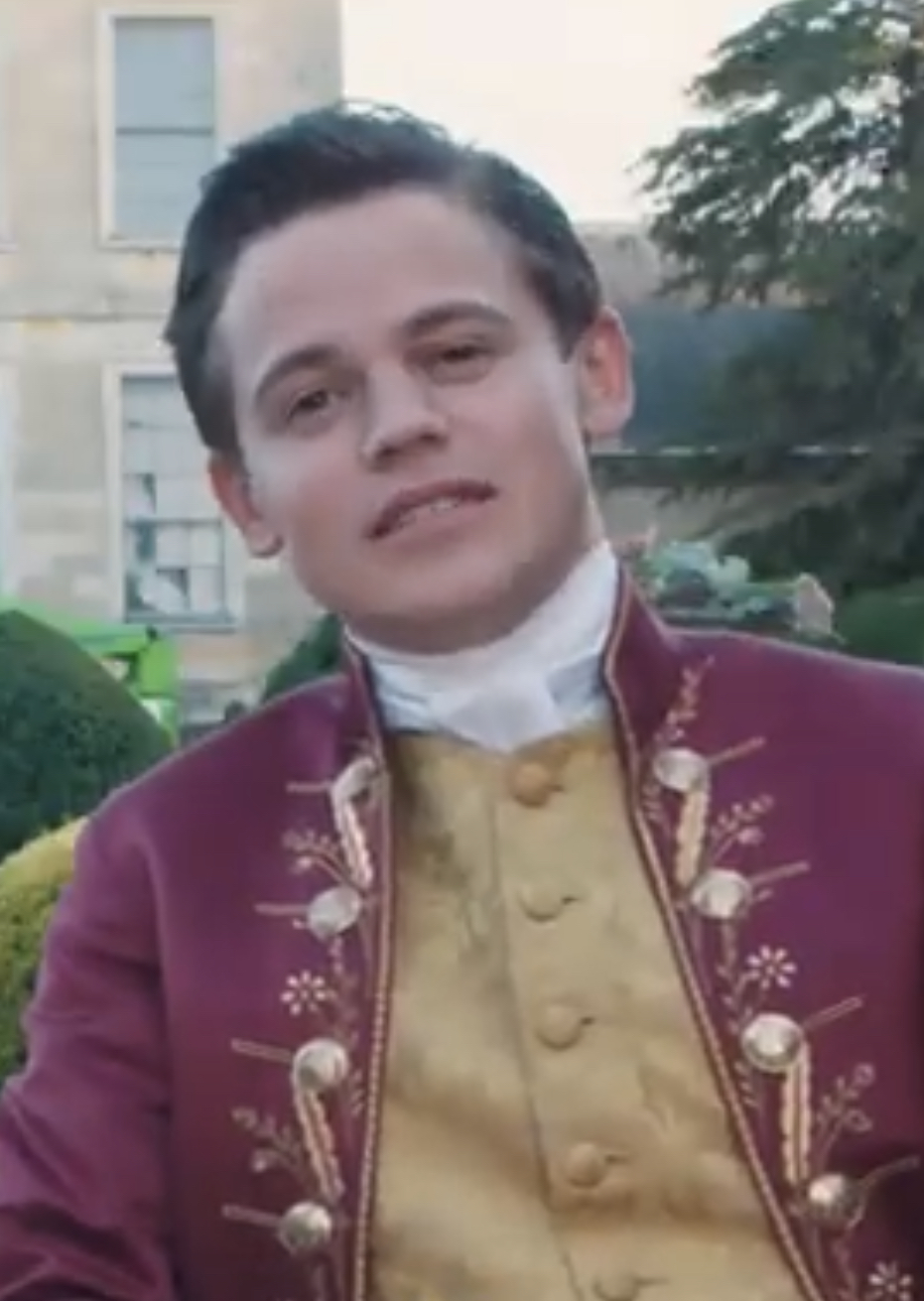
- Clemmett behind the scenes of Queen Charlotte
- Born: Samuel Timothy Clemmett; 1 October 1993 (age 32); Brundall, Norfolk, England
- Occupation: Actor
- Years active: 2011–present
- Spouse: Danarose Lobue (m. 2022)

Samuel Timothy Clemmett (born 1 October 1993) is a British actor. He is best known for his role as Albus Potter in the play Harry Potter and the Cursed Child. On television, he is known for his role as young Brimsley in the Netflix series Queen Charlotte: A Bridgerton Story (2023), portraying the series' first LGBT romance.

== Early life ==
Clemmett is from Brundall near Norwich. He attended Thorpe St Andrew School. He began acting as a hobby when he was a child, and later taking part in an intensive at the National Youth Theatre at 16.

== Career ==
Clemmett's first audition was for Lord of the Flies, going on to make his professional acting debut as Bill in the 2011 production of Nigel Williams' stage adaptation at Regent's Park Open Air Theatre. He made his television debut in 2013 with guest appearances in Foyle's War on ITV and Doctors on BBC One. Clemmett went on to play Ernst in Nivelli's War at the MAC in Belfast and Ian Trenting in Accolade at St James Theatre in London in 2014, and then Mark in WINK at Theatre503 and Tom in the Royal Shakespeare Company production of Wendy & Peter Pan in 2015. He appeared in an episode of the BBC period drama The Musketeers.

In 2016, it was announced Clemmett would star in the play Harry Potter and the Cursed Child, originating the role of Albus Severus Potter in the West End production at the Palace Theatre. He continued his role in the Broadway run of the play at the Lyric Theatre in 2018.

Clemmett starred as Charlie MacDonald in the 2021 World War I film The War Below. He also appeared in the crime film Cherry that year. He portrayed young Brimsley in the 2023 Netflix prequel Queen Charlotte: A Bridgerton Story.

== Personal life ==
Clemmett married Danarose Lobue in October 2022. He is a patron of MoCo Theatre Company at the Norwich Theatre Royal.

== Filmography ==
Year	Title	Role	Notes
2013	Foyle's War	Jack Shaw	Episode: "The Eternity Ring"
2013	Doctors	Olly Whitehall	Episode: "Where the Buck Stops"
2013	Burn the Clock	Jay	Short film
2014	Our World War	Bill Foulkes	Interactive episode: "High Wood"
2014	Holby City	Tay Simons	Episode: "Prince Among Men"
2015	Murder Games: The Life and Death of Breck Bednar	Lewis	Television documentary
2015	Survivor	Teen With Phone	
2016	The Musketeers	Luc	Episode: "Spoils of War"
2018	Endeavour	Rackaway	Episode: "Icarus"
2021	Cherry	Yuri	
2021	The War Below	Charlie	
2023	Queen Charlotte: A Bridgerton Story	Young Brimsley	

== Stage ==
Year	Title	Role	Notes
2011	Lord of the Flies	Bill	Regent's Park Open Air Theatre, London
2014	Nivelli's War	Ernst	The MAC, Belfast
2014	Accolade	Ian Trenting	St James Theatre, London
2015	WINK	Mark	Theatre503, London
2015	Wendy & Peter Pan	Tom	Royal Shakespeare Theatre, Stratford-upon-Avon
2016–2017	Harry Potter and the Cursed Child	Albus Severus Potter	Palace Theatre, London (originated the role on the West End)
2018–2019	Harry Potter and the Cursed Child	Albus Severus Potter	Lyric Theatre, New York originated the role on Broadway)
2026	Amadeus	Wolfgang Amadeus Mozart	Pasadena Playhouse, Pasadena, CA
