= Sam Hazeldine =

English actor (born 1972)

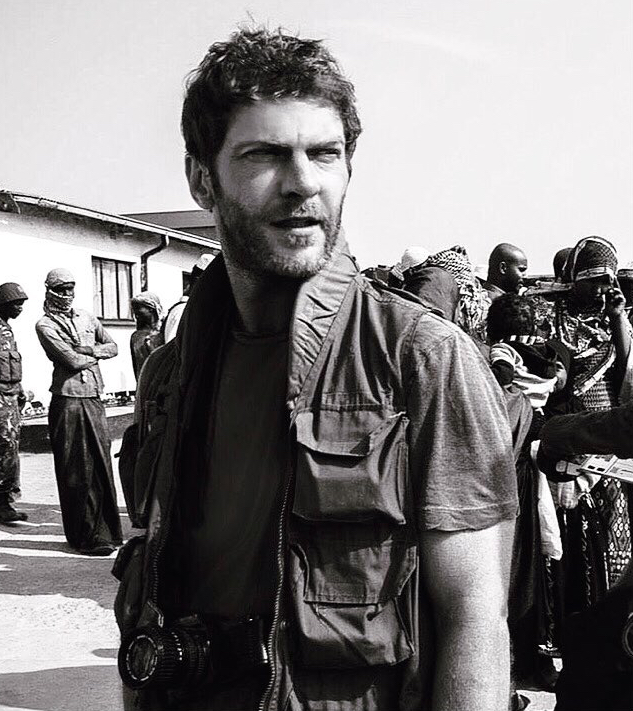
- Hazeldine in 2015
- Born: Samuel Hazeldine; 29 March 1972 (age 54); Hammersmith, London, England
- Occupation: Actor
- Years active: 2003–present
- Parent: James Hazeldine

Samuel Hazeldine (born 29 March 1972) is an English actor working in film, television and theatre. In film he has appeared in Bridget Jones: The Edge of Reason (2004), Weekender (2010), The Raven (2012), Grimsby (2016), and The Last Duel (2021). His television roles include Prime Suspect 6 (2003), Persuasion (2007), Lightfields (2013), Peaky Blinders (2014), Resurrection (2014–2015), Knightfall (2017), Requiem (2018), The Innocents (2019), Temple (2019), Slow Horses (2022), The Sandman (2022), Rain Dogs (2023), Masters of the Air (2023), and he plays Adar in the second series of The Lord of the Rings: The Rings of Power (2024).

== Early life ==
Sam Hazeldine was born in Hammersmith, London. He is the son of actors James Hazeldine and Rebecca Moore. He studied at the Royal Academy of Dramatic Art for two years, before leaving to pursue a career in music with the band Mover.

== Career ==
Hazeldine returned to acting ten years later in 2003, when he made his professional debut as D.C. David Butcher in Prime Suspect 6. In 2007, he played Charles Musgrove in the British television film Persuasion, together with Sally Hawkins and Rupert Penry-Jones.

In 2014, he had a recurring role as George Sewell in the British period crime drama television series Peaky Blinders, alongside Cillian Murphy and Tom Hardy. Between 2014 and 2015, he starred as Caleb Richards in the American fantasy drama television series Resurrection.

In 2018, Hazeldine took on a main role playing John McDaniel in the British supernatural television series The Innocents, alongside Guy Pearce. Despite positive reviews, no further series followed.

In 2019, he was cast in The War Below, which released in 2021. That same year he appeared in Ridley Scott's The Last Duel, in a cast which included Jodie Comer, Matt Damon, Ben Affleck, and Adam Driver.

In 2024, Hazeldine replaced Joseph Mawle in the role of Adar for season two of The Lord of the Rings: The Rings of Power.

== Filmography ==
=== Film ===
Year	Film	Role	Notes
2004	Bridget Jones: The Edge of Reason	Journalist	
2005	Chromophobia	Muso Assistant	
2010	The Wolfman	Horatio	Uncredited
2011	Weekender	Maurice	
2012	The Raven	Ivan	
2012	Riot on Redchurch Street	Ray Mahoney	
2012	Dead Mine	Stanley	
2013	The Machine	James	
2014	Still	Josh	
2014	'71	C.O.	
2014	The Monuments Men	Colonel Langton	
2016	Grimsby	Chilcott	
2016	The Huntsman: Winter's War	Liefr	
2016	Mechanic: Resurrection	Riah Crain	
2017	The Hitman's Bodyguard	Garrett	
2018	Ashes in the Snow	Kostas Vilkas	
2018	Last Supper	Vincent	
2019	Killers Anonymous	Senator Kyle	
2020	Marionette	Josh	
2020	The Intergalactic Adventures of Max Cloud	Tony	
2021	The Last Duel	Thomin du Bois	
2021	The War Below	William Hawkin	
2022	Kira & El Gin	Harvey	
2024	A Beautiful Imperfection	Jamieson	
2025	260 Days	Hinko Gubina	
2026	The Weight	Amis	
2026	Vindicta	SS Officer Otto Becker	

=== Television ===
Year	Title	Role	Notes
2003	Prime Suspect	DC David Butcher	2 episodes
2004	Passer By	Young Man	Television film
2004, 2007	The Bill	Graham Butler / David Latham	2 episodes
2004, 2011	Shameless	Quentin / Mark	2 episodes
2005	Doctors	Rob Tanner	1 episode
2005	Dalziel and Pascoe	Sean Doherty	2 episodes: "Dust Thou Art"
2005–2008	New Tricks	Mark	2 episodes
2006	Life on Mars	Colin Raimes	1 episode
2006	Foyle's War	Will Grayson	1 episode
2006	Holby City	Philip Jennssen	1 episode
2006	Robin Hood	Owen	1 episode
2007	Persuasion	Charles Musgrove	Television film
2007–2008	Midsomer Murders	Simon Dixon	4 episodes
2008	City of Vice	John Hill	Miniseries, 1 episode
2008	Emmerdale	Dr. Roger Elliot	1 episode
2008	Heartbeat	Frank Kelly	1 episode
2008–2009	The Kevin Bishop Show	Various characters	Main role, 10 episodes
2009	Waterloo Road	Captain Andy Rigby	1 episode
2009	Paradox	Matt Hughes	1 episode
2011	Lewis	Dane Wise	1 episode
2012	Eternal Law	Bruno	1 episode
2012	Accused	Ray Dakin	1 episode
2013	Ripper Street	George Doggett	1 episode
2013	Silent Witness	Scott Lambert	2 episodes
2013	Lightfields	Albert Felwood	Miniseries, 5 episodes
2013	The Village	Chalcraft	1 episode
2014	Peaky Blinders	George Sewell	Recurring role, 5 episodes
2014–2015	Resurrection	Caleb Richards	Recurring role, 5 episodes
2015	The Dovekeepers	Flavius Silva	Miniseries, 2 episodes
2017	Knightfall	Godfrey	3 episodes
2018	Requiem	Sean Howell	Miniseries, 4 episodes
2018	The Innocents	John McDaniel	Main role, 8 episodes
2019	Temple	Jack Lorean	Recurring role, 5 episodes
2021	The Witcher	Eredin	1 episode
2022	Slow Horses	Moe	2 episodes
2022	The Sandman	Barnaby Farrell	2 episodes
2022	The Playlist	Ken Parks	
2023	Rain Dogs	Paul	
2024	Masters of the Air	Col. Albert Clark	Miniseries
2024	The Lord of the Rings: The Rings of Power	Adar	Recurring role
2026	The Rapture	Leonard Krall	5 episodes

=== Theatre ===
Year	Title	Role	Theatre	Ref.
2004	Blues for Mister Charlie	George	Tricycle Theatre	
2006	Hamlet	Horatio	Ambassadors Theatre	
2007	Othello	Cassio	Salisbury Playhouse	
2007	Snowbound	Tom	Trafalgar Studios	
2009	Twelfth Night	Orsino	York Theatre Royal	
2009	The Homecoming	Lenny	York Theatre Royal	
2010	The Gods Weep	The Soldier/Husband	Hampstead Theatre	
2010	Ditch	Turner	The Old Vic Tunnels	
2015	Little Eyolf	Borgheim	Almeida Theatre	
2024	Coriolanus	Cominius	National Theatre	
