= List of awards and nominations received by Jodie Comer =

Jodie Comer awards and nominations
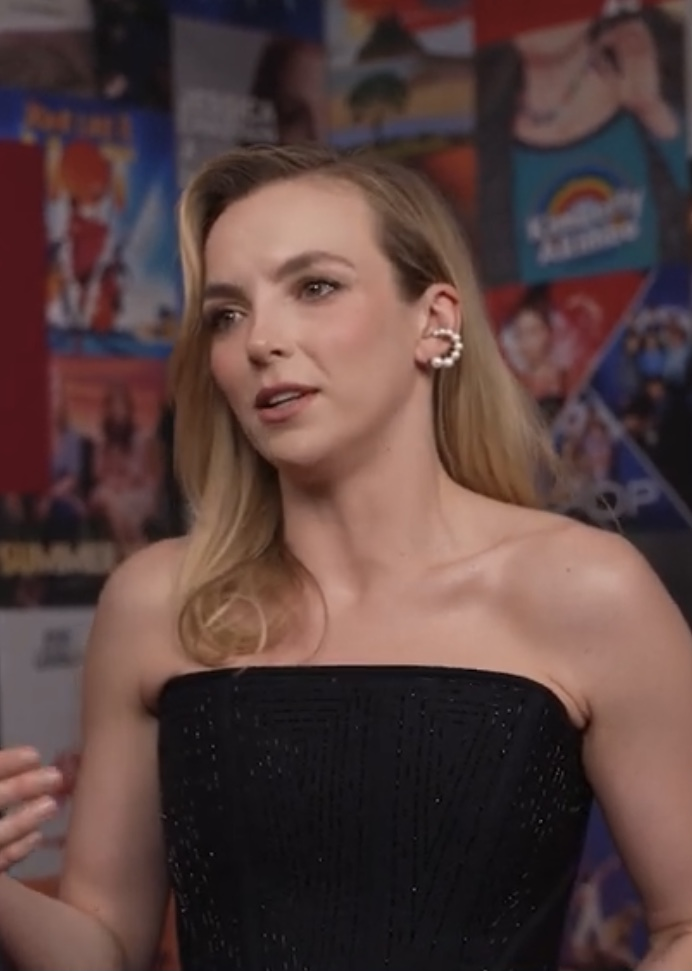
- Comer in 2023
Awards and nominations
Award	Wins	Nominations
Actor Awards	0	1
BAFTA Awards	2	6
Critics' Choice Awards	1	4
Emmy Awards	2	4
Golden Globe Awards	0	2
Olivier Awards	1	1
Tony Awards	1	1

Totals (Note: Certain award groups do not simply award one winner. They acknowledge several different recipients, have runners-up, and have third place. Since this is a specific recognition and is different from losing an award, runner-up mentions are considered wins in this award tally. For simplification and to avoid errors, each award in this list has been presumed to have had a prior nomination.)
- Wins: 22
- Nominations: 62

Jodie Comer is an English actress. Known for her performances on stage and screen she has received two BAFTA TV Awards, a Emmy Award, a Olivier Award, and a Tony Award. She has also received nominations for two Golden Globe Awards, and an Actor Award.

From 2018 to 2022, Comer starred as Villanelle in the BBC America spy thriller series Killing Eve, winning the British Academy Television Award for Best Actress and the Primetime Emmy Award for Outstanding Lead Actress in a Drama Series as well as nominations for an Actor Award for Outstanding Performance by a Female Actor in a Drama Series and two Golden Globe Awards for Best Actress – Television Series Drama. For starring as a healthcare assistant in the television film Help (2021), she won another British Academy Television Award.

Comer made her West End theatre debut in Suzie Miller's one-woman play Prima Facie in 2022, which won her a Laurence Olivier Award. Following its transfer to Broadway in 2023, she won the Tony Award for Best Actress in a Play.

On film, she portrayed Marguerite de Carrouges in the Ridley Scott directed historical drama The Last Duel (2021) as well as the Critics' Choice Super Award for Best Actress in an Action Movie. That same year she portrayed a software engineer in science-fiction comedy Free Guy (2021) for which she was nominated for the Critics' Choice Super Award for Best Actress in a Science Fiction/Fantasy Movie.

== Major associations ==
=== Actor Awards ===
Year	Category	Nominated work	Result	Ref.
2020	Outstanding Actress in a Drama Series	Killing Eve	Nominated	

=== BAFTA Awards ===
Year	Category	Nominated work	Result	Ref.
British Academy Television Awards
2017	Best Actress	Thirteen	Nominated	
2019	Best Actress	Killing Eve	Won	
2020	Best Actress	Killing Eve	Nominated	
2021	Best Actress	Killing Eve	Nominated	
2022	Best Actress	Help	Won	
2022	Best Single Drama	Help	Nominated	

=== Critics' Choice Awards ===
Year	Category	Nominated work	Result	Ref.
Critics' Choice Television Awards
2019	Best Actress in a Drama Series	Killing Eve	Nominated	
2020	Best Actress in a Drama Series	Killing Eve	Nominated	
Critics' Choice Super Awards
2022	Best Actress in an Action Movie	The Last Duel	Won	
2022	Best Actress in a Science Fiction/Fantasy Movie	Free Guy	Nominated	

=== Emmy Awards ===
Year	Category	Nominated work	Result	Ref.
Primetime Emmy Awards
2019	Outstanding Lead Actress in a Drama Series	Killing Eve (episode: "I Hope You Like Missionary!)	Won	
2020	Outstanding Lead Actress in a Drama Series	Killing Eve (episode: "Are You From Pinner?")	Nominated	
2022	Outstanding Lead Actress in a Drama Series	Killing Eve (episode: "Don't Get Eaten")	Nominated	
International Emmy Awards
2022	Best TV Movie or Miniseries	Help	Won	

=== Golden Globe Awards ===
Year	Category	Nominated work	Result	Ref.
2020	Best Actress – Television Series Drama	Killing Eve	Nominated	
2021	Best Actress – Television Series Drama	Killing Eve	Nominated	

=== Olivier Awards ===
Year	Category	Nominated work	Result	Ref.
2023	Best Actress	Prima Facie	Won	

=== Tony Awards ===
Year	Category	Nominated work	Result	Ref.
2023	Best Actress in a Play	Prima Facie	Won	

== Miscellaneous awards ==
Year	Award	Category	Work	Result	Ref.
2016	Radio Times Reader Awards	Best Actress	Thirteen	Nominated	
2016	TV Choice Awards	Best Actress	Thirteen	Nominated	
2017	Royal Television Society Awards	Best Actor (Female)	Thirteen	Nominated	
2018	Dorian Awards	TV Performance of the Year – Actress	Killing Eve	Nominated	
2018	Female First Awards	Television Actress of the Year	Killing Eve	Won	
2018	Marie Claire Future Shaper Awards	Acting High Flyer	Killing Eve	Won	
2018	Television Critics Association	Individual Achievement in Drama	Killing Eve	Nominated	
2019	National Television Awards	Drama Performance	Killing Eve	Nominated	
2019	Broadcasting Press Guild Awards	Best Actress	Killing Eve	Won	
2019	Royal Television Society Award	Best Actor (Female)	Killing Eve	Won	
2019	Stylist Remarkable Women Awards	Best Entertainer	Killing Eve	Won	
2019	MTV Movie & TV Awards	Best Villain	Killing Eve	Nominated	
2019	Television Critics Association	Individual Achievement in Drama	Killing Eve	Nominated	
2019	TV Choice Awards	Best Actress	Killing Eve	Won	
2019	Broadcast Digital Awards	Best Short-Form Drama	Snatches: Moments from Women's Lives	Won	
2020	Satellite Awards	Best Actress – Drama Series	Killing Eve	Nominated	
2020	National Television Awards	Drama Performance	Killing Eve	Nominated	
2020	NME Awards	Best TV Actor	Killing Eve	Nominated	
2020	TV Choice Awards	Best Actress	Killing Eve	Won	
2021	MTV Movie & TV Awards	Best Kiss	Killing Eve	Nominated	
2021	Satellite Awards	Best Actress in a Miniseries or Television Film	Help	Nominated	
2021	Indiana Film Journalists Association	Best Actress	The Last Duel	Runner-up	
2021	Dublin Film Critics Circle Awards	Best Actress	The Last Duel	6th place	
2021	Greater Western New York Film Critics Association Awards	Best Actress	The Last Duel	Nominated	
2021	IGN Summer Movie Awards	Best Lead Performer in a Movie	The Last Duel	Nominated	
2022	Columbus Film Critics Association	Best Supporting Actress	The Last Duel	Nominated	
2022	Golden Schmoes Awards	Best Actress of the Year	The Last Duel	Nominated	
2022	Online Film & Television Association	Best Breakthrough Performance: Female	The Last Duel	Nominated	
2022	Seoul International Drama Awards	Best Actress	Help	Won	
2022	Broadcasting Press Guild Awards	Best Actress	Help	Nominated	
2022	Saturn Awards	Best Supporting Actress	Free Guy	Nominated	
2022	The Stage Debut Awards	Best West End Debut Performer	Prima Facie	Won	
2022	Evening Standard Theatre Awards	Best Actress	Prima Facie	Won	
2023	WhatsOnStage Awards	Best Performer in a Play	Prima Facie	Won	
2023	Broadway.com Audience Choice Awards	Favorite Performance of the Year (Play)	Prima Facie	Nominated	
2023	Broadway.com Audience Choice Awards	Favorite Leading Actress in a Play	Prima Facie	Nominated	
2023	Broadway.com Audience Choice Awards	Favorite Breakthrough Performance (Female)	Prima Facie	Nominated	
2023	Dorian Theatre Awards	Outstanding Lead Performance in a Broadway Play	Prima Facie	Won	
2023	Drama Desk Awards	Outstanding Solo Performance	Prima Facie	Won	
2023	Drama League Award	Distinguished Performance	Prima Facie	Nominated	
2023	Outer Critics Circle Award	Outstanding Solo Performance	Prima Facie	Won	
2023	Theatre World Award	Outstanding Debut Performance	Prima Facie	Honored	
2023	British Independent Film Award	Best Lead Performance	The End We Start From	Nominated	
