= The War Below =

- Poster
- Directed by: J.P. Watts
- Written by: J.P. Watts; Thomas Woods
- Produced by: Luis Guerrero; William Knochel; Chris Lemos
- Starring: Sam Hazeldine; Tom Goodman-Hill; Kris Hitchen; Elliot James Langridge; Sam Clemmett; Joseph Steyne; Andrew Scarborough
- Cinematography: Nick Cooke
- Music by: Anne Kulonen
- Production company: Vital Pictures
- Distributed by: Vital Pictures
- Release date: 10 September 2021
- Running time: 96 minutes
- Language: English
- Budget: £500,000

The War Below is a 2021 British war film directed by J.P. Watts, in his directorial debut, and written by Watts and Thomas Woods. It was released in the United Kingdom on 10 September 2021. The film is also distributed in Germany, France, Greece, Australia, the Middle East, South Korea and Japan.

== Plot ==
Based on a true story, the film is about a group of British miners (known as "Claykickers" or “Manchester Moles”) recruited during World War I to tunnel underneath no man's land and place mines below the German front for the Battle of Messines in 1917. The Germans reported 10,000 soldiers were killed instantly after the detonation of explosives beneath their lines.

== Cast ==
- Sam Hazeldine as William Hawkin
- Tom Goodman-Hill as Hellfire Jack
- Kris Hitchen as Harold Stockford
- Elliot James Langridge as George MacDonald
- Sam Clemmett as Charlie MacDonald
- Joseph Steyne as Shorty
- Sonny Ashbourne Serkis as Henry
- Anna Maguire as Jane Hawkin
- Andrew Scarborough as Colonel Fielding
- Douglas Reith as Field Marshal Lord Haig
- Jake Wheeldon as Cpt. Leonard Graves

== Release and reviews ==
The War Below was released in theaters and digital platforms in the United Kingdom on September 10, 2021. It was released on streaming services in the United States on November 11, 2021.

On review aggregator Rotten Tomatoes, The War Below holds an approval rating of 88% based on 8 reviews. Writing in The Sunday Times, Kevin Maher awarded the film 3 out of 5 stars and stated it is "a fascinating Great War side story and a gritty central turn from Sam Hazeldine..." Writing in The Guardian, Phil Hoad described the film as having "an innately fascinating story, even if the underpinning is of unsound construction in places.”
