= Killers Anonymous =

- Theatrical release poster
- Directed by: Martin Owen
- Written by: Martin Owen; Elizabeth Morris; Seth Johnson; Jaden Raglin
- Produced by: Kirsty Bell; Matt Williams
- Starring: Tommy Flanagan; Rhyon Nicole Brown; Jessica Alba; Gary Oldman
- Cinematography: Håvard Helle
- Edited by: Stephen Hedley
- Music by: Roger Goula
- Production companies: The Ideas Factory; Fabrication Films; Goldfinch Studios; Grindstone Entertainment Group
- Distributed by: Lionsgate
- Release date: June 28, 2019 (United States)
- Running time: 95 minutes
- Country: United States
- Language: English
- Box office: $100,581

Killers Anonymous is a 2019 American crime thriller film, directed by Martin Owen, from a screenplay by Owen, Elizabeth Morris and Seth Johnson. It stars Tommy Flanagan, Rhyon Nicole Brown, Jessica Alba, Gary Oldman, MyAnna Buring, Michael Socha, Tim McInnerny and Sam Hazeldine. It was released on June 28, 2019, by Lionsgate.

== Plot ==
The film begins with the meeting of a support group in Los Angeles, during which the unnamed leader of the group, The Man, takes a call asking him to come to London. Once in London, he meets Jade in a bar in broad daylight, asks her why Senator Kyle is still alive and advises her to leave. The subsequent film opener shows a fight between Krystal and Jade in a club, which Jade loses.

Alice enters a church and meets the priestess Joanna. Joanna has set up a support group called "Killers Anonymous" in the church hall of her parish in London. The group's participating killers, who meet to talk about their mental problems after the murders and how their consciences are bothering them, include the feisty Violet, an unnamed old-school gangster, a doctor with his own idea of euthanasia, the emotional Leandro and the constantly nervous Ben. On this evening, they are all extremely nervous because the streets are swarming with police officers due to the shooting of US Senator Kyle.

They find Senator Kyle, who has been shot, in the church hall. Joanna reveals that she shot at Kyle but missed after Jade's previous attempt on his life failed. She also reveals that she works for the CIA, which is in fact behind the orders of the assassins participating in the support group. But now she is working for the Russians, who pay better.

Morgan, Alice's adopted sister who was also raised in Russia, is hiding in the church hall. The two of them test the participants in the support group for loyalty to their new employer. The female participants pass, but the males fail and are told to wait in the church hall for an hour. They don't obey and there is a subsequent massacre in the church in which only Alice and Morgan survive. The two then fly back to Los Angeles with The Man to welcome new members of the support group.

== Cast ==
- Tommy Flanagan as Markus
- Rhyon Nicole Brown as Alice
- MyAnna Buring as Joanna
- Michael Socha as Leandro
- Tim McInnerny as Calvin
- Sam Hazeldine as Senator Kyle
- Suki Waterhouse as Violet
- Elizabeth Morris as Krystal
- Elliot James Langridge as Ben
- Isabelle Allen as Morgan
- Jessica Alba as Jade
- Gary Oldman as The Man
- Harmony Hyde-Neath as Young Alice

== Production ==
In June 2018, it was announced Gary Oldman, Jessica Alba, Tommy Flanagan, Rhyon Nicole Brown, MyAnna Buring, Michael Socha, Tim McInnerny, Sam Hazeldine, Elizabeth Morris, Elliott James Langridge, Isabelle Allen and Suki Waterhouse had joined the cast of the film, with Martin Owen directing from a screenplay by Morris, Owen and Seth Johnson.

== Release ==
In October 2018, Lionsgate and Grindstone Entertainment Group acquired distribution rights to the film. It was released theatrically in the United States on June 28, 2019.

== Reception ==
=== Box office ===
Killers Anonymous grossed $0 in the United States and Canada, and $100,581 in other territories.

=== Critical response ===
The movie holds a 0% rating approval on Rotten Tomatoes based on 9 reviews.
