= Let's Be Evil =

- Directed by: Martin Owen
- Written by: Elizabeth Morris; Martin Owen; Jonathan Willis
- Produced by: Martin Barnes; David Bostock; Vincent Bull
- Starring: Isabelle Allen; Jamie Bernadette; Kara Tointon; Elliot James Langridge; Elizabeth Morris
- Cinematography: Chase Bowman
- Edited by: Daniel Gethic
- Music by: Julian Scherle
- Production company: Posterity Pictures
- Distributed by: Netflix; IFC Midnight
- Release dates: 5 August 2016 (US); 28 October 2016 (UK)
- Running time: 82 minutes
- Country: United Kingdom
- Language: English
- Budget: $9.9 million

Let's Be Evil is a 2016 British science fiction-horror film directed by Martin Owen and written by Elizabeth Morris, Martin Owen, and Jonathan Willis. The film stars Isabelle Allen, Jamie Bernadette, Kara Tointon, Elliot James Langridge, and Elizabeth Morris, and focuses on Jenny, who—having been tasked with caring for a sick parent in need of expensive meds—is starting a brand-new job as a chaperone in a programme for gifted youths. The film was one of the special screenings at Slamdance Film Festival 2016. The film was produced by Posterity Pictures, and was theatrically released on 5 August 2016 by IFC Midnight.

== Plot ==
A young girl named Jenny witnesses her father being shot to death. American society begins to suffer as the inefficient educational system threatens to lead to an entire generation of obese children with below average IQ, leading to a lack of innovation and the stagnation of America’s economy.

Jenny as an adult lives with her terminally ill mother, and to pay medical bills, she accepts a job as chaperone for intellectually gifted children from the Posterity Project, a program designed to make smart children smarter. Jenny meets fellow chaperones, Tiggs and Darby, in the program's underground facility which runs in complete darkness, requiring the use of virtual reality glasses to see, also providing the children access to their lessons. Jenny meets ARIAL (Augmented Reality Information Advanced Learning), the artificial intelligence who runs the facility. Jenny, Tiggs, and Darby are warned that, outside of their physical needs, the children are not to be distracted from their lessons, or their employment will be terminated.

Jenny is uncomfortable that the children only have structured lessons, and advises ARIAL that children need opportunities to play. Among the children is Cassandra, who Jenny learns, is the program's smartest participant. Jenny attempts to communicate with the students, but is informed by ARIAL that the students only converse with each other through virtual reality, so Jenny is ignored.

One day, Jenny notices Cassandra is missing and finds her hiding without her glasses, allowing Jenny to begin bonding with her. That night, ARIAL informs Jenny that Cassandra is not in her bedroom. Searching for her, Jenny is startled by strange visions in which Cassandra vanishes into thin air after scratching a threat onto a door. By the time Jenny brings Tiggs and Darby to the door, the threat has vanished and Cassandra is asleep in her bed. Jenny begins to have strange dreams, and on several occasions, is frightened by malfunctions to her glasses showing her visions of things that are not there, along with malfunctions to the facility's electronic systems. Jenny decides to quit, but is convinced to stay by Tiggs. Cassandra later apologizes to Jenny for everything that scared her, claiming that it was the other children playing pranks.

A short time later, all the children disappear, with ARIAL unable to locate them with her tracking software. Jenny is terrified by a vision of the children shooting her in the face. ARIAL immediately informs them that they must escape the facility, as the children have begun hacking her. ARIAL abruptly shuts down while Darby and Tiggs are both attacked and disappear.

While searching for the exit, Jenny finds Cassandra hiding alone with her glasses missing, just as ARIAL manages to reboot. Cassandra claims, because she is newest to the program, the other children bully her by stealing her glasses, and that the frequent removal of her glasses stopped her from fully connecting to the system, which is why she isn’t yet like the other children. They find Tiggs, who claims that the children attacked her, but she escaped. Together they evade the children and find Darby tied up and beaten. Heading for the exit, they find the door locked with a man on the other side, who Cassandra identifies as a previous chaperone. They watch as the children burn the man alive before vanishing.

ARIAL directs them to an air vent that should lead them to safety. However, upon reaching the safe area, Darby is attacked by the children, who suffocate him with a plastic bag, while Cassandra and Tiggs are attacked in the dark and dragged away, leaving Jenny alone. Jenny escapes the children by puncturing a pipe and spraying one of the children in the face with hot steam, revealing that the children made themselves invisible by tampering with the virtual reality glasses.

Jenny locates Cassandra who reveals that she can see without glasses, as she has virtual reality contact lenses, and is in fact the children’s leader and has even been controlling ARIAL. Cassandra explains that she agreed with Jenny’s opinion that children need to play, so they have been playing a game with Jenny trapped in a virtual reality time loop as their favorite toy. Jenny turns to run only to find herself in a simulation of her apartment with amnesia. Jenny answers the phone and, once again, accepts a job as an adult chaperone for the Posterity Project while Cassandra watches and smiles.

== Cast ==
- Isabelle Allen as Cassandra
- Jamie Bernadette as Body of Arial
- Kara Tointon as Tiggs
- Elliot James Langridge as Darby
- Brooke Johnston as Newsroom Anchor
- Elizabeth Morris as Jenny
- Sophie Willis as Young Jenny
- Jules Brown as Jenny's Dad

== Reception ==
The film holds a 17% rating on Rotten Tomatoes based on 12 reviews.
