= Anne Boleyn (TV series) =

British thriller miniseries (2021)

- Title card
- Genre: Psychological thriller
- Written by: Eve Hedderwick Turner
- Directed by: Lynsey Miller
- Starring: Jodie Turner-Smith
- Composer: Keaton Henson
- Country of origin: United Kingdom
- Original language: English

Production
- Executive producer: Dan Jones
- Producers: Faye Ward; Hannah Farrell
- Production company: Fable Pictures

Original release
- Network: Channel 5
- Release: 1 June – 3 June 2021

Anne Boleyn is a British three-part psychological thriller television series developed for Channel 5 starring Jodie Turner-Smith in the title role. It was written by Eve Hedderwick Turner and directed by Lynsey Miller with historian Dan Jones as executive producer.

== Premise ==
The series is set in Anne Boleyn's final five months prior to her execution by beheading for treason in 1536.

== Cast ==
- Jodie Turner-Smith as Anne Boleyn
- Mark Stanley as Henry VIII
- Paapa Essiedu as George Boleyn
- Barry Ward as Thomas Cromwell
- Amanda Burton as Anne Shelton
- Lola Petticrew as Jane Seymour
- Thalissa Teixeira as Madge Shelton
- Isabella Laughland as Elizabeth Browne
- Anna Brewster as Jane Boleyn
- Kris Hitchen as the Duke of Norfolk
- Turlough Convery as Henry Norris
- Jamael Westman as Edward Seymour
- Phoenix Di Sebastiani as Eustace Chapuys
- Aoife Hinds as Princess Mary
- James Harkness as William Kingston
- Abhin Galeya as Thomas Cranmer

== Episodes ==
No.	Title	Directed by	Written by	Original release date	U.K viewers (millions)
1	"Episode 1"	Lynsey Miller	Eve Hedderwick Turner	1 June 2021	1.44
2	"Episode 2"	Lynsey Miller	Eve Hedderwick Turner	2 June 2021	1.05
3	"Episode 3"	Lynsey Miller	Eve Hedderwick Turner	3 June 2021	1.00

== Production ==
=== Development ===
Ben Frow of Channel 5 first mentioned the project at the Edinburgh Fringe Festival in summer 2020. The three-part "convention-defying" series from Fable Pictures was officially announced in October 2020, with Eve Hedderwick Turner as writer and Lynsey Miller as director. Faye Ward and Hannah Farrell of Fable produced and historian Dan Jones executive produced. The series "sets out to examine Anne Boleyn's life through a feminist lens as she struggles to conceive a boy heir and pushback against the society she was born into."

=== Casting ===
In October 2020, it was announced with the series that Jodie Turner-Smith would star as Anne Boleyn with Paapa Essiedu, Amanda Burton, Thalissa Teixeira, Barry Ward, and Jamael Westman also set to feature. Mark Stanley joined the cast as Henry VIII in November.

=== Filming ===
Principal photography took place in Yorkshire over six weeks, finishing in December 2020. Filming locations included Castle Howard in North Yorkshire, Bolton Castle in Wensleydale, Bolton Abbey in Wharfedale, Oakwell Hall in Birstall, St Michael's Church in Emley, Harewood House in Harewood, and Ripley Castle in Ripley.

== Release ==
The first episode premiered in the UK on Channel 5 on 1 June 2021. Sony Pictures Television co-financed the project with Channel 5 and distributed the series internationally. The drama was released in the United States on AMC+ and on Crave in Canada.

== Reception ==
Review aggregator Rotten Tomatoes reported an approval rating of 53% based on 20 critic reviews, with an average rating of 6.2/10. The website's critics consensus reads, "Though the show around her isn't quite up to snuff, there's no denying the pleasure of Jodie Turner-Smith's powerful turn as the one-and-only Anne Boleyn."

The Guardian and The Independent both gave the drama 3 stars out 5. Lucy Mangan of the former said the series "works" but criticised its "silly surplus of metaphors" and portrayal of Henry. Adam White of the latter found the show a "soapy romp" but that it made sense for the story being told. Turner-Smith's performance was widely praised. Beth Webb of Empire called the series a "showcase of Jodie Turner-Smith's resilience as a performer" and mentioned how the "small but well-assembled supporting cast elevates her performance".

There was several criticism of the race swapping historical characters and blackwashing, as some of the actors were black while the characters portrayed were white, such as Boleyn herself, highlighting above all the fact that it is a historical series with real and well-known historical characters as protagonists. The Radio Times described this as "identity-conscious casting" and quoted the actor Mark Stanley: "It was all about this being the right person for the job, rather than what we as a society might perceive as the 'right look' for the job".
