= Isabelle Allen =

English actress

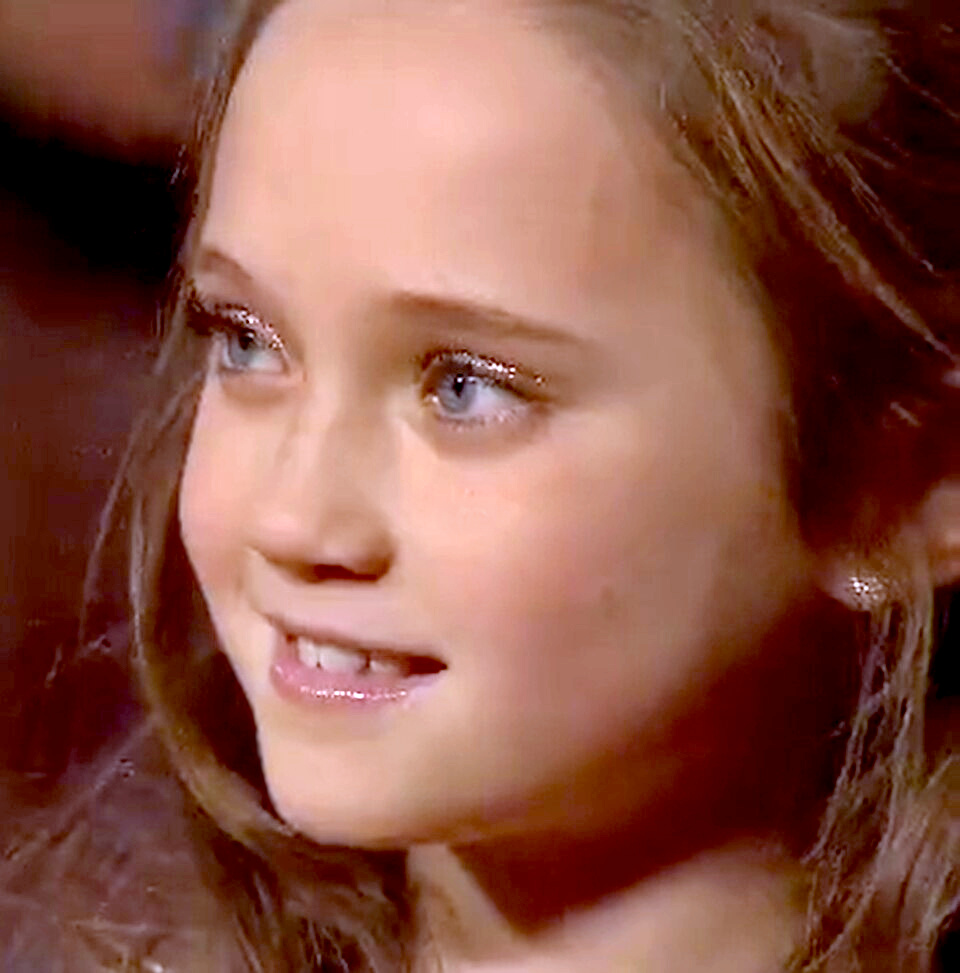
- Allen - World Premiere Les Misérables 2012
- Born: Isabelle Lucy Allen; 16 March 2002 (age 24); Salisbury, Wiltshire, England
- Occupation: Actress
- Years active: 2012–present
- Known for: Les Misérables

Isabelle Lucy Allen (born 16 March 2002) is an English stage and screen actress known for her role as the young Cosette in the 2012 film adaptation of Les Misérables. The role earned her critical acclaim and various film cast awards such as the National Board of Review Award for Best Cast and the Satellite Award for Best Cast – Motion Picture.

== Career ==
Allen was discovered by Jeremy James Taylor, head of the British National Youth Music Theatre after seeing her in the play The Pied Piper in Eastbourne, East Sussex, her hometown. She made her professional debut in the 2012 film Les Misérables as the younger version of Amanda Seyfried's character Cosette, which earned her the Young Artist Award for Best Supporting Young Actress Age Ten and Under. She was later cast in the same role in the West End stage production of the show. She continued in the show until March 2013, sharing her role with Lois Ellington, Ashley Goldberg and Sarah Huttlestone. From July to September 2013, Allen played Brigitta Von Trapp in The Sound of Music, sharing her role with Imogen Gurney and Ava Merson O'Brien. She has also appeared in Hetty Feather, a CBBC drama.

== Personal life ==
Her parents are Elaine and Nigel Allen.

== Filmography ==
=== Film ===
Year	Title	Role	Notes
2012	Les Misérables	Young Cosette	
2015	Lady of Csejte	Aletta	Released as Blood Countess in the UK
2016	The Contract	Casey	
2016	Let's Be Evil	Cassandra	
2016	In Extremis	Anna	
2019	Killers Anonymous	Morgan	
2020	The Intergalactic Adventures of Max Cloud	Sarah	

=== Television ===
Year	Title	Role	Notes
2015	Guin and the Dragon	Guin	Television film
2015–2017	Hetty Feather	Elizabeth	Main role (series 1–3)
2018	Safe	Carrie Delaney	Main role
2018–2019	In the Long Run	Kerry	4 episodes
2020	Find Me in Paris	Romy Jensen	Recurring role
2025	Wild Cherry	Jocasta	Main Cast

== Awards and nominations ==
Award	Year	Category	Work	Result
Critics' Choice Movie Awards	2012	Best Acting Ensemble	Les Misérables	Nominated
National Board of Review Award	2012	Best Cast	Les Misérables	Won
Phoenix Film Critics Society Award	2012	Best Cast	Les Misérables	Nominated
Phoenix Film Critics Society Award	2012	Best Youth Performance in a Lead or Supporting Role-Female	Les Misérables	Nominated
San Diego Film Critics Society	2012	Best Performance by an Ensemble	Les Misérables	Nominated
Satellite Awards	2012	Best Cast – Motion Picture	Les Misérables	Won
Screen Actors Guild Awards	2012	Outstanding Performance by a Cast in a Motion Picture	Les Misérables	Nominated
Washington D.C. Area Film Critics Association	2012	Best Ensemble	Les Misérables	Won
Young Artist Award	2013	Best Performance in a Feature Film - Supporting Young Actress Ten and Under	Les Misérables	Won
