= The Intergalactic Adventures of Max Cloud =

- Directed by: Martin Owen
- Written by: Sally Collett; Martin Owen
- Starring: Scott Adkins
- Release date: December 18, 2020 (United States)
- Running time: 88 minutes
- Country: United Kingdom
- Language: English

The Intergalactic Adventures of Max Cloud (also titled Max Cloud) is a 2020 British science fiction action comedy film written by Sally Collett and Martin Owen, directed by Owen and starring Scott Adkins.

== Cast ==
- Scott Adkins as Max Cloud
- Elliot James Langridge as Jake
- Sally Collett as Rexy
- Franz Drameh as Cowboy
- Tommy Flanagan as Brock Donnelly
- John Hannah as Revengor
- Lashana Lynch as Shee
- Isabelle Allen as Sarah
- Sam Hazeldine as Tony
- Jason Maza as Space Witch

== Release ==
The film was released on VOD in the United States on December 18, 2020.

== Reception ==
The film has a 59% rating on Rotten Tomatoes based on 22 reviews. Nick Drew of SciFiNow awarded the film three stars out of five. Brian Costello of Common Sense Media also awarded the film three stars out of five. Cath Clarke of The Guardian awarded the film two stars out of five. Bobby LePire of Film Threat rated the film an 8 out of 10.

Josh Bell of Comic Book Resources gave the film a negative review and wrote, “The movie hits plenty of nostalgia buttons for gamers, but that’s the most it has to offer.”
