= Hearts and Bones (TV series) =

- Created by: Stewart Harcourt
- Starring: Damian Lewis; Andrew Scarborough; Dervla Kirwan; Sarah Parish; Amanda Holden; Hugo Speer; Rose Keegan; Derek Benfield
- Country of origin: United Kingdom
- Original language: English
- No. of series: 2
- No. of episodes: 13

Production
- Running time: 50 Minutes
- Production companies: Meridian Broadcasting; United Productions for BBC

Original release
- Network: BBC One
- Release: 30 April 2000 – 30 August 2001

Hearts and Bones is a television drama series, about a group of friends who move from Coventry to London, starring Damian Lewis, Dervla Kirwan, Sarah Parish and Andrew Scarborough which aired on BBC One in 2000. A second series followed in 2001. It featured the first screen appearance of Michael Fassbender.

The complete DVD set was released in 2007.

== Cast ==
=== Main cast ===
- Damian Lewis, Mark Rose (Series 1)
- Andrew Scarborough, Michael Owen
- Dervla Kirwan, Emma Rose
- Hugo Speer, Richard Rose
- Amanda Holden, Louise Slaney
- Sarah Parish, Amanda Thomas
- Rose Keegan, Sinead Creagh

=== Guest cast ===
- Derek Benfield, Mike Piper
