= Andrew Scarborough =

English actor (born 1973)

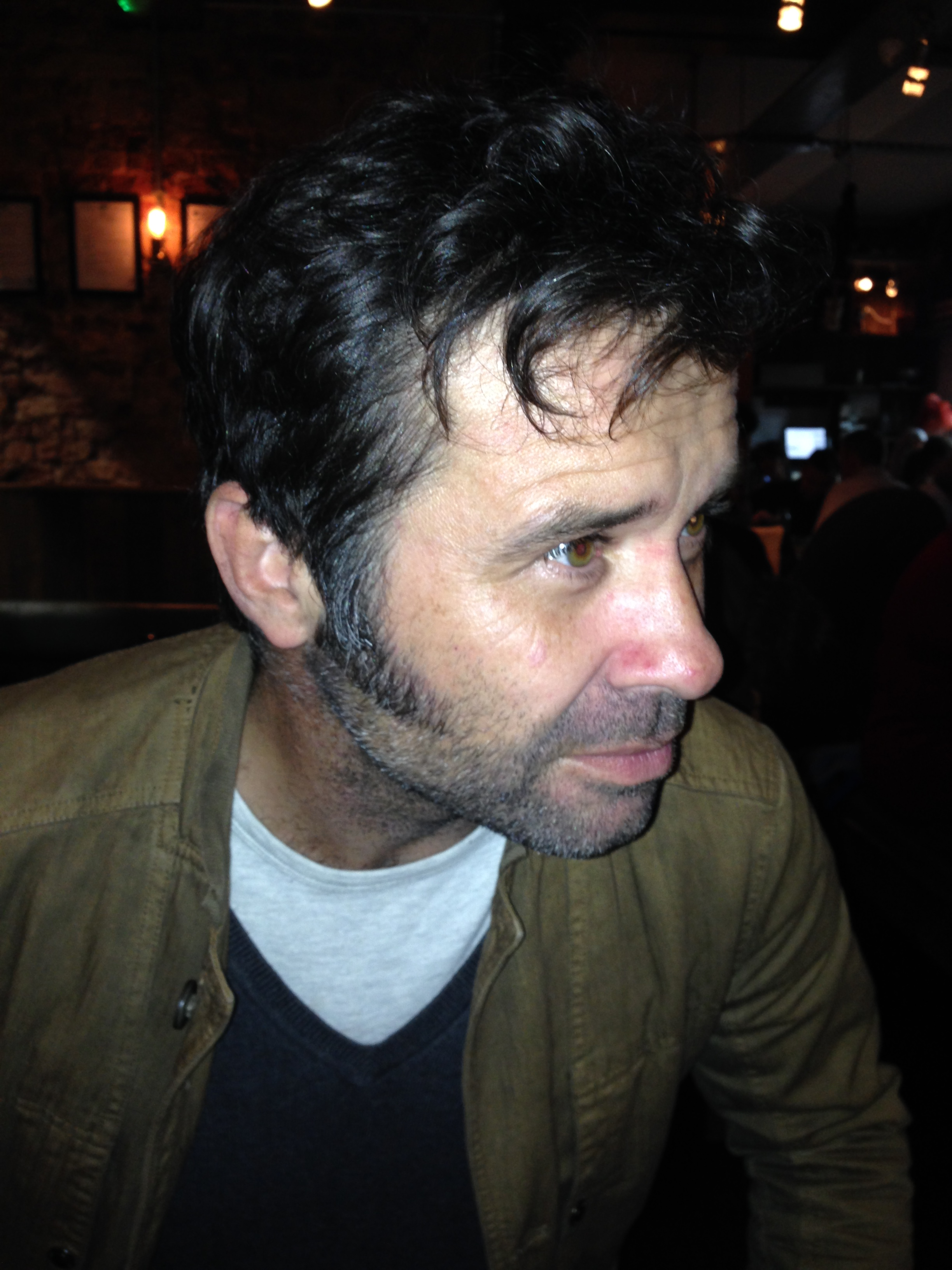
- Born: November 30, 1973 (age 52); Harrogate, North Yorkshire, England
- Occupation: Actor
- Years active: 1993–present
- Notable work: Downton Abbey; Hearts and Bones; The War Below
- Television: Spooks; Rome; Suburban Shootout; Bad Girls; Emmerdale
- Awards: Screen Actors Guild Award for Outstanding Performance by an Ensemble in a Drama Series (2014)

Andrew Scarborough (born 30 November 1973) is an English actor, most widely known for his starring role on screen as Tim Drewe in the multi BAFTA and Emmy award-winning Downton Abbey. He also co-starred as Colonel Fielding in the film ‘’The War Below’’ and as Graham Foster in the television drama series Emmerdale. He is also known for his roles on screen in Hearts and Bones, The Bible, Hidden and Bad Girls. He played Joseph Holhurst in the ITV miniseries 2025 Code of Silence. Scarborough is also a theatre actor, performing in many of London's major theatres, including the West End theatre, and in numerous provincial theatres in the UK. He has also toured on the European continent with the Actors Touring Company and performed at the Renaissance-Theatre Berlin in Mark Ravenhill's Handbag.

== Early life ==
Scarborough was born in Harrogate, North Riding of Yorkshire and attended Harrogate Grammar School.

== Career ==
Scarborough trained at the Webber Douglas Academy of Dramatic Art and made his professional debut on stage at the Harrogate Theatre in three plays, beginning with The Government Inspector as Dobchinsky, then A Midsummer Night's Dream as Oberon, and lastly as the Genie of the Lamp in the British 'panto' version of Aladdin. He then went on to play Heathcliff in Emily Brontë's Wuthering Heights and from there played Renaldo in the 1995 London Almeida theatre production of Hamlet starring Ralph Fiennes.

Scarborough made his television debut on the BBC's popular medical drama Casualty. He then went on to play roles in various TV dramas, including The Bill (ITV), Streets of Gold (S4C), Heartbeat (ITV), Touching Evil (ITV) and Silent Witness (BBC One). He also made a guest appearance in one of Britain's most highly regarded and favourite soaps Coronation Street as "love rat" Harvey Reuben.

His film debut was in a Hallmark production of Jason and the Argonauts.

He then went on to starring roles as Kevin Spiers in ITV's Bad Girls, Stewart Diamond in Channel 5's Suburban Shootout, Mark in The Innocent (a film for ITV), Michael Owen in the BBC comedy drama Hearts and Bones, which earned him rave reviews, Joshua in The Bible (History Channel), Magistrate Bassat in Jamaica Inn (BBC One), and Tim Drewe in Downton Abbey (ITV), which earned him more rave reviews. More recently, he starred as Colonel Fielding in The War Below.

== Personal life ==
Away from acting, Scarborough enjoys cycling.

== Filmography ==
Year	Title	Role	Notes
1993–2000	Casualty	PC / Daniel / Gavin Turner...	Various roles in multiple episodes
1994–1999	The Bill	Wilf Harris: Stanton's Story / Roy Packham / Barry Shackford / ...	Various roles in multiple episodes
1996–1997	Y Palmant Aur	Marcus	Welsh language title, translates as "Streets of Gold"
1997	Trial and Retribution	Tom	
1998	Silent Witness	Marco Rossi	
1999	Dangerfield	PC Dewhurst	
1999	Touching Evil	DC Martin Simmons	Main cast member
2000	Heartbeat	Martin Weller	
2000	Jason and the Argonauts	Aeson's soldier	TV film
2001	The Innocent	Mark Latimer	Co-starring Cast member
2000–2001	Coronation Street	Harvey Reuben	Recurring guest; 13 episodes
2000–2001	Hearts and Bones	Michael Owen	Starring main cast member; 13 episodes
2004	Eyes Down	Philip	Sitcom
2005	Rome	Milo	
2005	Bad Girls	Kevin Spiers	Cast member; 7 episodes
2006–2007	Suburban Shootout	Stewart Diamond	Cast member
2007	Roman Mysteries	Josephus	
2007–2016	Holby City	Tim Campbell / Danny Berg / Marcus Dunn	
2008–2010	Doctors	Martin Venning / DS Vince Blackwell	Various roles in multiple episodes
2008	The Royal Today	Dr Jonathan Ormerod	Regular cast member; 50 episodes
2009	Spooks	Stephen Hillier	
2011	Hidden	Ben Lander	Guest
2011	EastEnders	Carter	Guest
2012	Silk	DS Adam Lambert	
2013	Our Girl	Sergeant Peters	Episode: "Pilot"
2013	The Bible	Joshua	Cast member
2013–2015	Downton Abbey	Tim Drewe	Cast member; 11 episodes
2014	Jamaica Inn	Magistrate Bassat	Cast member
2017	Wolfblood	Hartington	Main antagonist in season 5
2017–2020, 2026–present	Emmerdale	Graham Foster	Regular cast member; 291 episodes
2021	The War Below	Colonel Fielding	Co-starring cast member; feature film
2024	Father Brown	Captain Fred Howton	Series 11, episode 10 "The Scars of War"

== Theatre ==
Year	Title	Role	Notes
1993	Henry V	Henry V	Tabard Theatre
1993	The Government inspector	Dobchinsky	Harrogate Theatre
1993	Midsummer Night's Dream	Oberon	Harrogate Theatre
1993	Aladdin	Genie of the Lamp	Harrogate Theatre
1994	Wuthering Heights	Heathcliff	Northampton Theatre and York Royal Theatre
1995	Hamlet	Renaldo	Hackney Empire
1996	Loot	Dennis	Theatre Clwyd and Tour
1998	Wuthering Heights	Hindley	Good Theatre Company UK Tour
1998	Handbag	David / Moncreiff	A new play for the ATC Theatre at Lyric Hammersmith studio and UK and European tour
2002	Wild Orchids	The Prince	Chichester Festival Theatre
2003	The Master Builder	Ragnor	Albery Theatre / West End
2004	Electricity	Michael	A new Play for the West Yorkshire Playhouse
2005	Relative Values	Nigel	Salisbury Playhouse
2015	Uppercut	Barry	A new play for the Southwark Playhouse
