= Tommy Flanagan (actor) =

Scottish actor (born 1965)

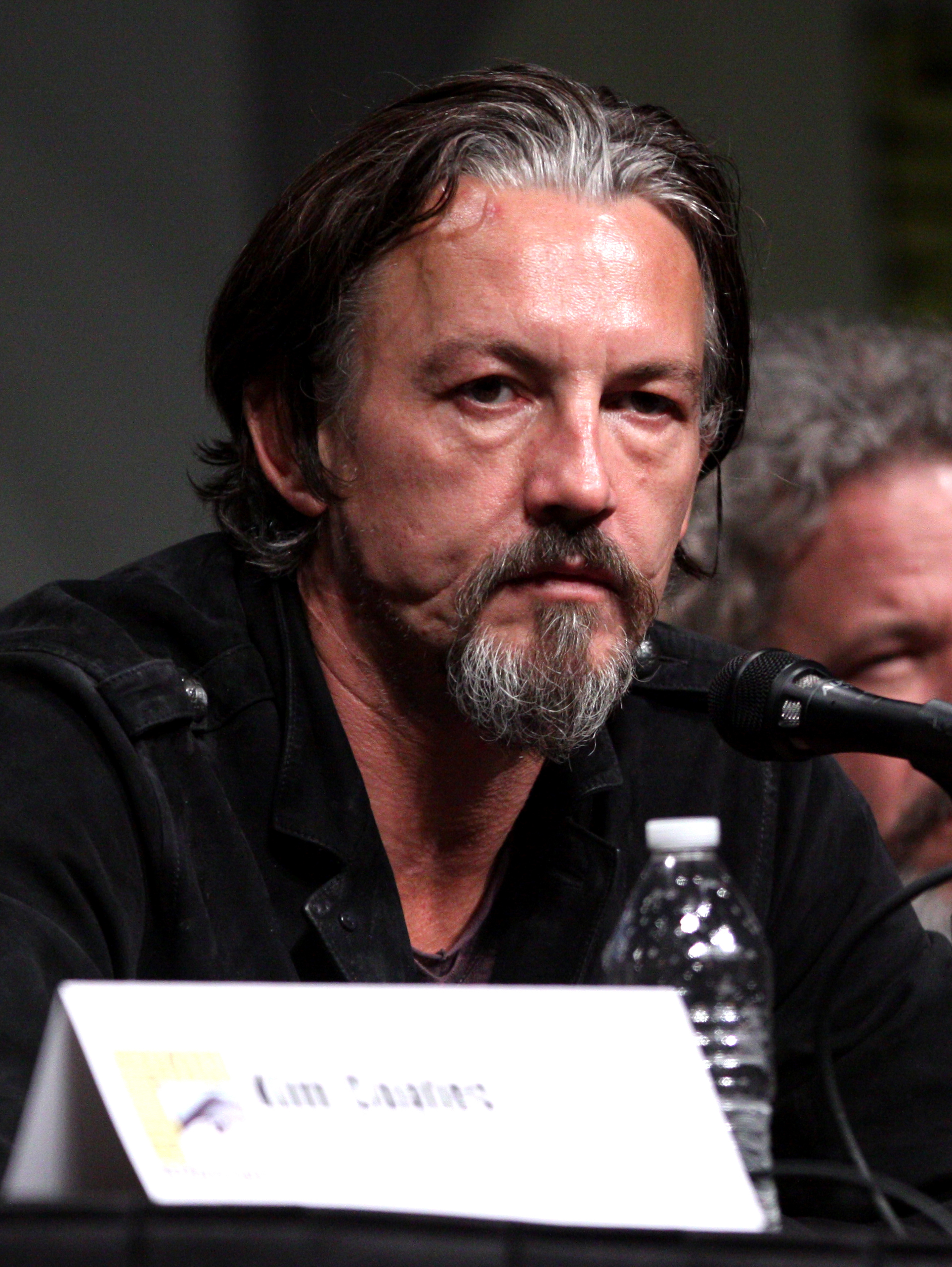
- Flanagan at the 2012 San Diego Comic-Con
- Born: 3 July 1965 (age 61); Glasgow, Scotland
- Occupation: Actor
- Years active: 1991–present
- Spouses: Rachel Flanagan (m. 1998; div. 2001) Jane Ford (m. 2007; div. 2010) Dina Flanagan (m. 2010)
- Children: 1

Thomas Flanagan (born 3 July 1965) is a Scottish actor. He is best known for his role as Filip "Chibs" Telford in the FX crime drama television series Sons of Anarchy (2008–2014) and its spin-off Mayans M.C. (2019), Cicero in Gladiator (2000), Morrison in Braveheart (1995), Tullk in Guardians of the Galaxy Vol. 2 (2017), Williamson in All About the Benjamins (2002), and The Stranger in When a Stranger Calls (2006).

== Early life ==
Flanagan was born in Easterhouse, Glasgow, the second of four children. His sister Sue is a nurse at Queen Elizabeth Hospital in Glasgow. He was an altar boy.

== Career ==
His first television roles were in Screen One (1992) and Taggart (1993). Flanagan worked in Robert Carlyle and Alexander Morton's Raindog Theatre for three years before being cast in Braveheart (1995). He has had roles in Face/Off (1997), The Game (1997), Sunset Strip (2000), Gladiator (2000), All About the Benjamins (2002), Charlie's Angels: Full Throttle (2003), Alien vs. Predator (2004), Sin City (2005), Smokin' Aces (2006), When a Stranger Calls (2006), The Last Drop (2006), Smokin' Aces 2: Assassins' Ball (2010), Guardians of the Galaxy Vol. 2 (2017) and the TV mini-series Attila.

He portrayed arms dealer Gabriel Schector in the first episode of 24's seventh season and appeared in the episode "Headlock" of Lie to Me, aired in the U.S. on Monday 2 August 2010. He was one of the main cast members of Sons of Anarchy, in which he plays an outlaw biker named Filip "Chibs" Telford. In October 2010, Flanagan was revealed as the spokesperson for the Scottish soft drink Irn-Bru. In July 2016, he appeared in the music video for the song "Rotting in Vain" by Korn.

Flanagan played McCullough on the Netflix series Wu Assassins which ran for one season, and as Walter Flynn in the Starz series Power Book IV: Force.

He was cast as Roderick Dustin in House of the Dragon in 2025.

== Personal life ==
Flanagan's facial scars are the result of a knife attack outside a nightclub where he had been working as a DJ. After leaving the club, he was attacked by a gang who stabbed and slashed him with a knife, leaving the scars on each side of his mouth.

Flanagan and his wife, Dina, have a daughter. He was previously married to Rachel Flanagan and Jane Ford.

== Filmography ==
=== Film ===
Year	Title	Role	Notes
1995	Braveheart	Morrison	
1997	The Saint	Scarface	
1997	Face/Off	Leo	
1997	The Detail		
1997	The Game	Solicitor/Taxi driver	
1999	Plunkett & Macleane	Eddie	
1999	Ratcatcher	George Gillespie	
2000	Gladiator	Cicero	
2000	Sunset Strip	Duncan	
2000	Hidden	McCracken	Short film
2001	Strictly Sinatra	Michelangelo	
2001	Dead Dogs Lie	Michael	
2002	All About the Benjamins	Williamson	
2003	Charlie's Angels: Full Throttle	Irish Henchman	
2004	Trauma	Tommy	
2004	Alien vs. Predator	Mark Verheiden	
2005	Sin City	Brian	
2005	The Last Drop	Pvt. Dennis Baker	
2006	When a Stranger Calls	The Stranger	
2006	Smokin' Aces	Lazlo Soot	
2008	Hero Wanted	Derek	Credited as Thomas Flannigan
2010	Luster	Les	
2010	Smokin' Aces 2: Assassins' Ball	Lazlo Soot	
2010	Swifty & Veg	Swifty	Short film
2011	Grace and Danger		
2012	Officer Down	Father Reddy	
2015	Winter	Woods Weston	
2016	Running Wild	Jon Kilpatrick	
2016	Sand Castle	SGM McGregor	
2017	Guardians of the Galaxy Vol. 2	Tullk Ul-Zyn	
2017	Papillon	Masked Breton	
2017	The Ballad of Lefty Brown	Tom Harrah	
2018	Legal Action	Mr Gates	
2019	Killers Anonymous	Markus	
2019	American Fighter	McClellen	
2019	The Rising Hawk	Tugar	
2019	The Wave	Aeolus	
2020	The Intergalactic Adventures of Max Cloud	Brock Donnelly	
2021	Montford: The Chickasaw Rancher	Holden	
2021	40-Love	Petrov	
2022	Code Name Banshee	Anthony Greene	
2022	There Are No Saints	Jet Rink	
2022	Boon	Mr Fitzgerald	
2024	Sleeping Dogs	Jimmy Remis	

=== Television ===
Year	Title	Role	Notes
1992	Screen One		Episode: "Black and Blue"
1993	Tis the Season to be Jolly	Prisoner	TV film
1993	Taggart	Tam McLeod	Episode: "Instrument of Justice"
1995	Jolly: A Life	Man at grotto	TV film
1996	Rab C. Nesbitt	Sean	Episode: "Lottery"
1996	A Mug's Game	Paul	
1996	Bad Boys	Harry	Episode: "The Bonny Bonny Banks"
2000	Rebus	Thomas Telford	Episode: "The Hanging Garden"
2001	Attila	Bleda	TV miniseries
2008–2014	Sons of Anarchy	Filip "Chibs" Telford	90 episodes
2009	24	Gabriel Schector	Episode: "Day 7: 8:00 a.m.-9:00 a.m."
2010	Lie to Me	Ron Marshall	Episode: "Headlock"
2011	Detroit 1-8-7	Albert Stram	2 episodes
2012	Law & Order: Special Victims Unit	Murphy	Episode: "Home Invasions"
2013	Peaky Blinders	Arthur Shelby Sr.	Episode: 'Episode 5'
2015	Revenge	Malcolm Black	3 episodes
2015	Gotham	Tom "The Knife"	1 episode "Rise of the Villains: The Son of Gotham"
2016	Motive	Jack Stoker	4 episodes
2019	Wu Assassins	Alec McCullough	Main role
2019	Mayans M.C.	Filip "Chibs" Telford	Special guest star (season 2) Episode: "Kukulkan"
2020	Westworld	Martin Conells / Dolores Abernathy (host)	3 episodes
2022–2023	Power Book IV: Force	Walter Flynn	Main role
2024	The Perfect Couple	Broderick Graham	3 Episodes, Miniseries
2025	MobLand	Moody	2 episodes
2026	House of the Dragon	Roderick Dustin	Main role; 6 episodes
