= Jodie Comer =

English actress (born 1993)

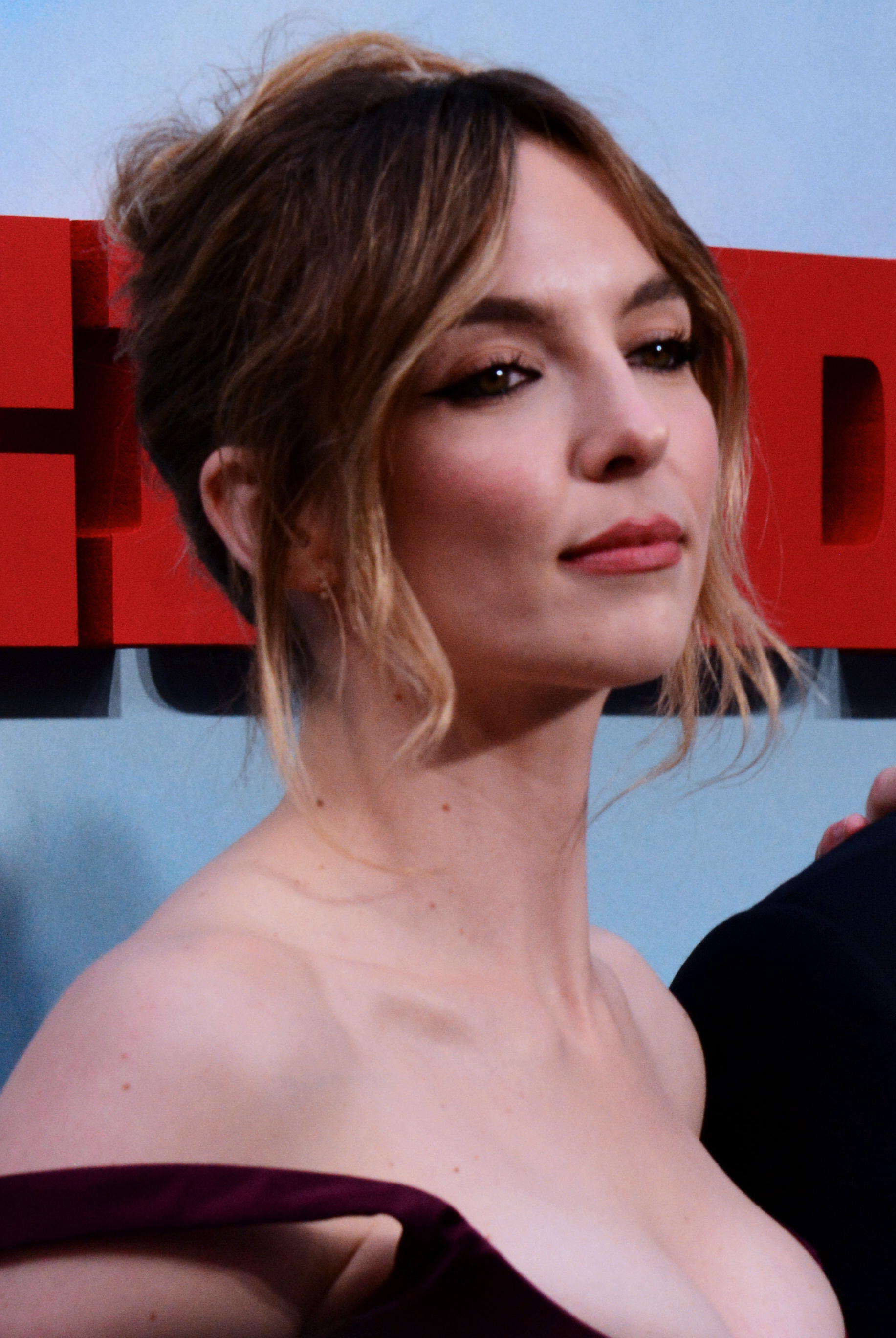
- Comer in 2024
- Born: 11 March 1993 (age 33); Liverpool, England
- Occupation: Actress
- Years active: 2007–present
- Awards: Full list

Jodie Comer (/ˈkoʊmər/ KOH-mər; born 11 March 1993) is an English actress of screen and stage. Her accolades include two British Academy Television Awards, a Primetime Emmy Award, a Tony Award, a Laurence Olivier Award, and two nominations for a Golden Globe Award.

Comer gained recognition for appearing in the series My Mad Fat Diary (2013–2015) and Doctor Foster (2015–2017), and starred in the drama miniseries Thirteen (2016). From 2018 to 2022, Comer played sociopathic assassin Villanelle in the BBC America spy thriller television series Killing Eve, winning a BAFTA Television Award and a Primetime Emmy Award. For playing Sarah, a healthcare assistant, in the television film Help (2021), she won another BAFTA Television Award.

Following a successful television career, Comer appeared in film roles. She has appeared in the action comedy film Free Guy (2021), historical drama The Last Duel (2021), The Bikeriders (2023), the environmental thriller The End We Start From (2023) and horror film 28 Years Later (2025). In April 2022, Comer made her West End theatre debut in Suzie Miller's one-woman play Prima Facie, and made her Broadway theatre debut in April 2023, when the play transferred to New York; she earned Best Actress in a Play for both performances, winning the Laurence Olivier Award in London in April 2023 and the Tony Award in New York in two months later.

== Early life ==
Comer was born in Liverpool on 11 March 1993; she has a younger brother born in 1995. Comer grew up in Liverpool's Childwall suburb, and attended St Julie's Catholic High School in its neighbouring Woolton suburb, where she became close friends with future Olympic athlete Katarina Johnson-Thompson.

At the age of 11, she started acting at a weekend drama school called CALS Theatre School in Belle Vale, near Childwall. It was located in Belle Vale Shopping Centre and run by Carol Wilson. Through Carol Wilson and CALS, Comer entered the Liverpool Performing Arts Festival in 2006 at St George's Hall and came first in her category after performing a monologue about the Hillsborough disaster.

While in high school, Comer's friends removed her from their dance group when a holiday with her family clashed with rehearsals for the school's talent show, prompting her to instead perform her Hillsborough disaster monologue for the show. Although she did not win, her performance prompted her drama teacher to call in a favour from friends in the entertainment industry, allowing her to audition for a BBC Radio 4 play. This became her first acting job, with her co-stars advising her to get an agent and telling her that she could have a successful acting career.

== Career ==
=== Career beginnings (2008–2017) ===
Comer's career began in 2008 with a guest role on an episode of The Royal Today. In 2010, she made her theatre debut in the play The Price of Everything, directed by Noreen Kershaw, at the Stephen Joseph Theatre. Comer then made minor appearances in several television series (see table below). She was cast in leading roles in the drama series Justice (2011), appeared in the Season 15, 2 part episode 'Fear' (9 and 10) BBC series Silent Witness (2012), the supernatural miniseries Remember Me (2014), and as Chloe Gemell in the E4 comedy-drama series My Mad Fat Diary (2013–2015). Comer appeared in the 2015 adaptation of Lady Chatterley's Lover (1928), a television film broadcast on BBC One. The same year, she played Kate Parks in the BBC One drama series Doctor Foster (2015–2017).

Her first starring role was in 2016 as Ivy Moxam in the BBC Three miniseries Thirteen, which earned her a nomination for the British Academy Television Award for Best Actress. In November 2016, she appeared in the BBC One miniseries Rillington Place as Beryl Evans, one of serial killer John Christie's victims. The same year, Comer was listed as one of Screen International's "Stars of Tomorrow" in association with the BFI London Film Festival. In 2017, she starred as a young Elizabeth of York in The White Princess on Starz, a sequel to the BBC One miniseries The White Queen (2013). Also in 2017, Comer made her feature film debut, as Christine in the Morrissey biographical drama England Is Mine, directed by Mark Gill.

=== Killing Eve and breakthrough (2018–2021) ===
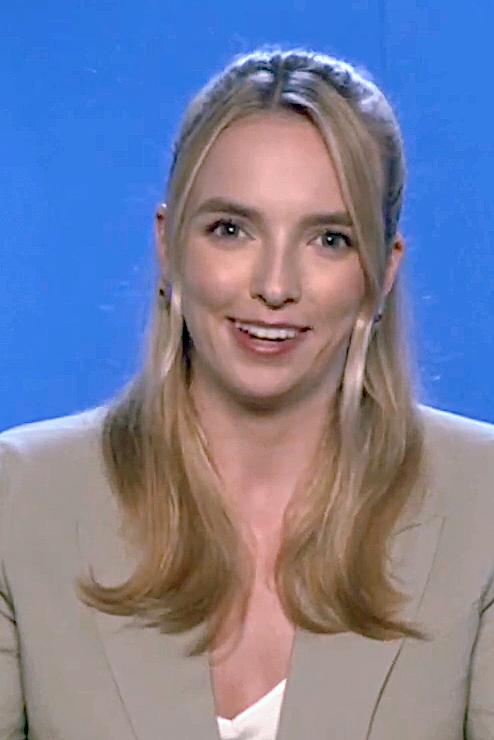
Comer in 2021

In April 2018, Comer began starring in the BBC America spy thriller series Killing Eve as Villanelle / Oksana Astankova, a sociopathic Russian assassin who develops a mutual obsession with Eve Polastri (Sandra Oh), the MI6 agent pursuing her. Comer garnered praise for her performance; Jia Tolentino of The New Yorker stated that, in the context of the series's "constant reversals in tone and rhythm", the "ambiguity—and impossibility—of Villanelle's character has worked (through the first season) thanks to Comer's mercurial, unassailable charisma".

After the first season of Killing Eve aired, Comer revealed how much she'd learned from embodying her character, stating: "I had this impression that, to do good acting, everything is minimal, really whispered, less is more. What I learned playing Villanelle is that there is acting that can be so full of life and bold that it is ridiculous at times. There was something very freeing about playing her." For the role, Comer was thrice nominated for the British Academy Television Award for Best Actress and Primetime Emmy Award for Outstanding Lead Actress in a Drama Series, winning both in 2019. Given her character's ability to adopt numerous accents as part of her disguises, fans are often astonished to hear Comer's native Scouse accent.

In June 2018, Comer played Linda, a 1960s Liverpool secretary exploring her sexuality, in the BBC Four series Snatches: Moments from Women's Lives, inspired by events that took place in the century since women first won the vote. In August 2018, Comer was ranked No. 94 on Radio Times's TV 100. In November 2018, The Hollywood Reporter included her in their list of the "Next Gen Talent 2018: Hollywood's Rising Young Stars".

In April 2019, Comer revealed she had been forced to drop out of Kenneth Branagh's 2022 adaptation of Agatha Christie's Death on the Nile due to scheduling conflicts. Also in 2019, Comer made a cameo appearance in the film Star Wars: The Rise of Skywalker, appearing as Rey's mother (Miramir) in a flashback. In June 2020, Comer played the lead role of Lesley in a BBC iPlayer reboot of the Talking Heads episode "Her Big Chance" (filmed in lockdown due to the COVID-19 pandemic). Comer next appeared in the action comedy film Free Guy, alongside Ryan Reynolds, in which she played two roles: Millie, a games developer, and Molotov Girl, Millie's in-game avatar. Released on 13 August 2021, a cover version of Mariah Carey song "Fantasy" (1995) sung by Comer was used in the film. For the role, she was nominated for the Saturn Award for Best Supporting Actress.

Later in 2021, Comer teamed with writer Jack Thorne and actor Stephen Graham to star in the Channel 4 drama Help, as a young care home worker struggling during the early days of the COVID-19 pandemic in the United Kingdom; she also served as an executive producer. The role earned her a fifth British Academy Television Award for Best Actress nomination, which she ultimately won the following year. Also in 2021, Comer portrayed Marguerite de Carrouges in Ridley Scott's The Last Duel, alongside Ben Affleck, Matt Damon and Adam Driver.

=== Prima Facie and beyond (2022–present) ===
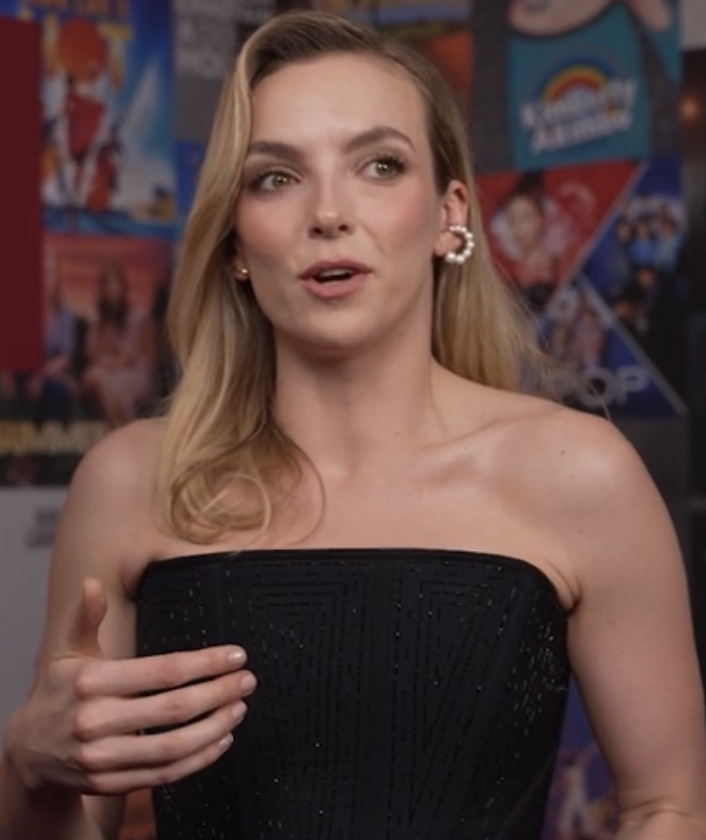
Comer in 2023

Comer made her West End debut in Suzie Miller's one-woman play Prima Facie at the Harold Pinter Theatre which started in April 2022 and concluded in June 2022. She was praised for her role as criminal defense barrister Tessa Ensler. Comer made her Broadway debut with Prima Facie when the production transferred from the West End, in spring 2023. Starting 21 July 2022, a filmed performance of the play at the Harold Pinter Theatre was shown at cinemas around the world by National Theatre Live (NT Live), where it became the highest-grossing event cinema release ever, taking in £4.47 million. For her performance, she won the Laurence Olivier Award for Best Actress and Tony Award for Best Actress in a Play. In January 2024, an audiobook based on the stage play's eponymous novel was released, which was narrated by Comer. Reflecting on her experience on stage, Comer termed it "the most overwhelming and powerful and life-affirming experience". In 2026, Comer reprised the role for a UK and Ireland tour.

In 2023, Comer starred, alongside Austin Butler and Tom Hardy, in Jeff Nichols's The Bikeriders, a drama inspired by the photography of Danny Lyon and his 1967 book of the same name. She subsequently starred in and produced the environmental thriller The End We Start From, an adaptation of Megan Hunter's debut novel, directed by Mahalia Belo. Both films received generally positive reviews, with Comer's performance receiving praise for both, though she received a polarized reaction towards her American accent in The Bikeriders. Comer stated that it was tough as the only woman on the set of The Bikeriders. In 2024, she voiced character Emily Hartwood in the survival horror video game Alone in the Dark, a reimagining of the 1992 original video game and the seventh installment in the Alone in the Dark video game series.

Comer later starred in Danny Boyle's horror film 28 Years Later, a sequel to the 2002 film 28 Days Later. She will also star in Branagh's psychological thriller film The Last Disturbance of Madeline Hynde. She will also star, alongside Hugh Jackman, in Michael Sarnoski's upcoming action film The Death of Robin Hood.

== Reception and acting style ==
Comer has been called one of the finest actors of her generation. She has stated that the performances she takes on have affected her mental state, claiming: "I guess I was naive to think that something wouldn't filter through from work to life eventually, even if you're not conscious of it." Comer has been commended for her ability to perform multiple accents.

On her roles, Comer said: "[If I know] why I'm stepping into it and know what I gain from the experience, then if it goes out into the world and people hate it or it completely goes unnoticed or it's a huge success, it doesn't matter ... That doesn't change my experience and how I felt." When looking back over her career in December 2018, she remarked: "I only became a real-life actor when I was about 17: that's when things started to pick up. If I saw any of my performances from then, I'd want to punch myself in the face."

In December 2018, British Vogue included Comer in its list of "The Most Influential Girls of 2018", and, in February 2019, Forbes included her in their annual "30 Under 30" list for being in the top 30 most influential people in the entertainment industry in Europe under the age of 30.

In September 2019, Comer was named the face of the Loewe spring/summer 2020 fashion campaign, which saw her star in a short film for the brand.

== Personal life ==
Comer is a lifelong supporter of Everton F.C., with her father working for the club as masseur for 29 years since the 1997–98 season under manager Howard Kendall until his retirement at the end of the 2025–26 season.

Comer said of her career in a December 2020 interview, "I don't believe [fame] changes people. It's just a magnifying glass [...] these opportunities are huge and glossy, but they're so far from the life that I live." She also discussed experiencing class discrimination in her career as an actress with a Liverpool accent, which is widely regarded as one of the most working class in the UK.

Noted for guarding her private life, Comer said in a June 2024 interview, "I've had moments in my life where I don't think you can underestimate the lengths people will go to invade that space. I think it's important as an actor that people connect with the work and not, 'Oh, did you know yesterday she had eggs for breakfast?'" She has expressed gratitude for the willingness of her family and friends to keep her grounded as her career grows: "The majority of my friends are from school [and] I don't have a lot of yes men around me, which I appreciate. That's what I realised when I finished on Broadway. I was like, 'I need to go home, to be a better sister, a better friend. I needed to be a more present daughter.'"

Comer considers herself to be a spiritual person.

== Acting roles ==
=== Film ===
Key
†	Denotes films that have not yet been released

List of Jodie Comer film credits
Year	Title	Role	Notes
2017	England Is Mine	Christine	
2019	Star Wars: The Rise of Skywalker	Rey's Mother (Miramir)	Cameo
2021	Free Guy	Millie Rusk / Molotov Girl	
2021	The Last Duel	Marguerite de Carrouges	
2023	The End We Start From	Woman	Also executive producer
2023	The Bikeriders	Kathy Bauer	
2025	28 Years Later	Isla	
2026	The Death of Robin Hood	Sister Brigid	
TBA	The Last Disturbance of Madeline Hynde †	TBA	Post-production
TBA	Stuffed †	Araminta	Post-production

=== Television ===
Key
†	Denotes television productions that have not yet been released

List of Jodie Comer television credits
Year	Title	Role	Notes
2008	The Royal Today	Leanne	Series 1: Episode 41
2010	Holby City	Ellie Jenkins	Episode: "Promises"
2010	Waterloo Road	Sarah Evans	Series 6: Episode 3
2011	Justice	Sharna Mulhearne	5 episodes
2012	Doctors	Kelly Lowther	Episode: "Another Day, Another Dollar"
2012	Silent Witness	Eve Gilston	Episodes: "Fear: Parts 1 & 2"
2012	Good Cop	Amy	Series 1: Episode 1
2012	Casualty	Maddy Eldon	Episode: "I'll See You in My Dreams"
2012	Coming Up	Cat Sullivan	Episode: "Postcode Lottery"
2013	Coming Up	Gemma	Episode: "Big Girl"
2013	Law & Order: UK	Jess Hayes	Episode: "Fatherly Love"
2013	Vera	Izzy Rawlins	Episode: "Young Gods"
2013–2015	My Mad Fat Diary	Chloe Gemell	16 episodes
2014	Inspector George Gently	Justine Leyland	Episode: "Blue for Bluebird"
2014	Remember Me	Hannah Ward	Miniseries (3 episodes)
2015	Lady Chatterley's Lover	Ivy Bolton	Television film
2015–2017	Doctor Foster	Kate Parks	9 episodes
2016	Thirteen	Ivy Moxam	Miniseries (5 episodes)
2016	Rillington Place	Beryl Evans	Miniseries (2 episodes)
2017	The White Princess	Elizabeth of York	Miniseries (8 episodes)
2018	Snatches: Moments from Women's Lives	Linda	Episode: "Bovril Pam"
2018–2022	Killing Eve	Villanelle / Oksana Astankova	Lead role
2020	Talking Heads	Lesley	Episode: "Her Big Chance"
2021	Help	Sarah	Television film; also executive producer
TBA	The Chain †	Rachel	Miniseries (8 episodes)

=== Theatre ===
List of Jodie Comer theatre credits
Year	Title	Role	Venue	Notes
2010	The Price of Everything	Ruby	Stephen Joseph Theatre	
2022	Prima Facie	Tessa Ensler	Harold Pinter Theatre	West End
2023	Prima Facie	Tessa Ensler	John Golden Theatre	Broadway
2026	Prima Facie	Tessa Ensler	Richmond Theatre	UK and Ireland tour
2026	Prima Facie	Tessa Ensler	Gaiety Theatre, Dublin	UK and Ireland tour
2026	Prima Facie	Tessa Ensler	Lyceum Theatre, Edinburgh	UK and Ireland tour
2026	Prima Facie	Tessa Ensler	New Theatre, Cardiff	UK and Ireland tour
2026	Prima Facie	Tessa Ensler	Grand Opera House, York	UK and Ireland tour
2026	Prima Facie	Tessa Ensler	Theatre Royal, Bath	UK and Ireland tour
2026	Prima Facie	Tessa Ensler	Marlowe Theatre, Canterbury	UK and Ireland tour
2026	Prima Facie	Tessa Ensler	Birmingham Rep	UK and Ireland tour
2026	Prima Facie	Tessa Ensler	Liverpool Playhouse	UK and Ireland tour

=== Video games ===
List of Jodie Comer video game credits
Year	Title	Role	Note
2024	Alone in the Dark	Emily Hartwood	Voice and likeness

=== Audiobooks ===
List of Jodie Comer video game credits
Year	Title	Role	Note
2021	Alice's Adventures in Wonderland	Jodie Comer	Narrator
2024	Prima Facie		Narrator

== Awards and nominations ==
Known for her performances on stage and screen, Comer has received two BAFTA Television Awards, one Laurence Olivier Award, one Primetime Emmy Award, and one Tony Award. She has also received nominations for a Screen Actors Guild Award, two Critics' Choice Awards, and two Golden Globe Awards.
