= Touching Evil =

Television series

- DVD cover
- Genre: Crime drama
- Created by: Paul Abbott
- Starring: Robson Green; Nicola Walker; Michael Feast; Adam Kotz; Andrew Scarborough; Shaun Dingwall
- Country of origin: United Kingdom
- Original language: English
- No. of series: 3
- No. of episodes: 16

Production
- Running time: 50 minutes
- Production company: Anglia Television

Original release
- Network: ITV
- Release: 29 April 1997 – 6 June 1999

Touching Evil is a British television drama serial following the exploits of a crack squad on the Organised & Serial Crime Unit, a rapid response police force that serves the entire country.

The serial was produced by United Productions for Anglia Television, and screened on the ITV network in 1997. It was created by Paul Abbott. The first season consists of six 50-minute (one-hour with advertisements) episodes written by Abbott with Russell T Davies. The popularity of the serial led to two sequel serials in 1998 and 1999, although not written by Abbott or Davies. The first episode aired on 29 April 1997, and the last on 6 June 1999, after 16 episodes and 3 series.

The serial stars Robson Green as D.I. Dave Creegan, with Nicola Walker co-starring as his colleague D.I. Susan Taylor. The third series was co-produced by Green's own independent production company Coastal Productions.

== Cast ==
=== Main cast ===
- Robson Green as D.I. Dave Creegan (series 1–3; 16 episodes)
- Nicola Walker as D.I. Susan Taylor (series 1–3; 16 episodes)
- Shaun Dingwall as D.C. Mark Rivers (series 1–3; 14 episodes)
- Michael Feast as Commander Stephen Enwright (series 1–3; 15 episodes)
- Mary Cunningham as Police Psychologist Marion (series 1–2; 11 episodes)
- Adam Kotz as D.C. Jonathan Kreitman (series 1; 6 episodes)
- Andrew Scarborough as D.C. Martin Simmons (series 3; 2 episodes)

=== Recurring cast ===
- Saskia Downes as Kerry Creegan (7 episodes)
- Antony Byrne as Barry (7 episodes)
- Holly Earl as Louise Creegan (series 1–2, 7 episodes)
- Molly Moloney as Ruby Creegan (7 episodes)
- John Duttine as Michael Hawkins (4 episodes)
- Kenneth MacDonald as Cyril (4 episodes)
- Sean Gilder as Steve Carroll (4 episodes)

== Episodes ==
=== Series overview ===
Series	Episodes	Originally released (UK)	
Series	Episodes	First released	Last released
1	6	29 April 1997	3 June 1997
2	6	29 April 1998	28 May 1998
3	4	16 May 1999	6 June 1999

=== Series 1 (1997) ===
No. overall	No. in series	Title	Directed by	Written by	Original release date	UK viewers (millions)
1	1	"The Lost Boys: Part 1"	Julian Jarrold	Paul Abbott	29 April 1997	N/A
DI Dave Creegan is paired with DI Susan Taylor on his first day to investigate the disappearance of three young schoolboys who have all been snatched in broad daylight. Creegan discovers a link with two boys who disappeared in Stuttgart some three years previously, but surveillance on his prime suspect fails to yield any information. Taylor is concerned that Creegan is putting all his eggs in one basket and efforts to investigate other lines of enquiry.
2	2	"The Lost Boys: Part 2"	Julian Jarrold	Paul Abbott	6 May 1997	N/A
A satellite surveillance van picks up images of the young boys held in an airtight room. Creegan realises that time is running out, and when prime suspect Ronald Hinks gives a silent interview, he realises he may have to break the rules to secure the boys' safety. As Taylor organises a house-to-house on an abandoned estate, Creegan kidnaps Hinks' dog and puts him onto a scent, which leads Creegan straight to the crime scene. But is he too late? When first aired on PBS, episodes 1 & 2 were retitled "Through the Clouds."
3	3	"Killing With Kindness: Part 1"	Marc Munden	Paul Abbott	13 May 1997	N/A
A group of patients who are all on the same ward at a local hospital die within minutes of each other. When the cause of death is found to be an overdose of drugs, and each of the victims has the tattoo 'let me go' stenciled onto their back, Creegan and Taylor investigate the hospital cleaner, Carl Burgess, who is found in possession of items belonging to a senior doctor. Creegan is left unconscious after being attacked at home, but who is responsible?
4	4	"Killing With Kindness: Part 2"	Marc Munden	Paul Abbott	20 May 1997	N/A
The investigation's attention turns towards locum Julie Carney following the attack on Creegan. When she commits another murder in Wales, Creegan realises that he needs to set a trap to lure her home. Rivers and Krietman's pursuit of an unstable Carl Burgess results in Burgess trying to kill a patient, and then electrocuting himself, from which he dies of his injuries. When Julie Carney resurfaces, Creegan is forced to watch on as she tries to commit suicide. Episodes 3 and 4 were sold as a standalone DVD, retitled as "To Death And Back"
5	5	"What Amathus Wants: Part 1"	Julian Jarrold	Russell T. Davies	27 May 1997	N/A
An investigation into multiple attacks on horses across the country reveals a mysterious website game called 'Amathus', where real life players are sucked into a violent reality where they must commit acts of violence in order to secure points and win prizes. When the next level of play results in a triple murder, Creegan realises he is running out of time. Meanwhile, an unstable Kreitman confesses to Creegan that he was responsible for Ronald Hinks' death.
6	6	"What Amathus Wants: Part 2"	Julian Jarrold	Paul Abbott	3 June 1997	N/A
Creegan and Taylor reel in convicted killer Justine Barber, whose crimes from some years ago mirror the exact methods used to commit the current murder. When she leads them to prime suspect Leonard Stoker, a chase ensues and Stoker is arrested. Creegan has no choice but to file a report on Kreitman. Enwright refuses to press charges on the grounds of no evidence, but leaves Kreitman without a job. Kreitman, upset at the result, goes on the rampage. When first aired on PBS, these episodes were retitled "Deadly Web."

=== Series 2 (1998) ===
No. overall	No. in series	Title	Directed by	Written by	Original release date	UK viewers (millions)
7	1	"Scalping: Part 1"	Sheree Folkson	Mike Cullen	29 April 1998	N/A
Creegan and Taylor investigate a serial killer who is sending reports of each of his murders to a local journalist, David Laney. When Creegan and Rivers tail the prime suspect to a shack in the woods, both their hesitation results in the death of another victim. However, with the killer in custody, Creegan is surprised to receive another message stating another murder is about to happen. The search of a warehouse yields another body, that of a local MP.
8	2	"Scalping: Part 2"	Sheree Folkson	Mike Cullen	30 April 1998	N/A
Creegan realises that Laney may have been the killer all along, and puts surveillance on him. However, when he slips out of sight, he confronts an innocent café owner who is later found dead, with her throat having been cut. Laney then kidnaps Taylor and takes her back to the shack in the woods. Creegan and Rivers arrive to find a hostage situation, but the guilt over his hesitation the first time leads Rivers to jump in and shoot Laney dead.
9	3	"War Relief: Part 1"	Rachel Talalay	Sian Orrells	7 May 1998	N/A
Creegan and Taylor investigate links between a number of dead bodies found in white body bags, having been delivered to the homes of the victim. The trail leads the team straight to the aftermath of the Bosnian war, where all of the victims played a part in the clean-up and salvage operation. Rivers, angered that he had the prime suspect in his clutches, attacks him when the team finally catch up with him. However, a shocking revelation blows the case wide open.
10	4	"War Relief: Part 2"	Rachel Talalay	Sian Orrells	14 May 1998	N/A
Rivers goes it alone to try and track down Keller, but the killer's one-man rampage results in two further murders and two further attacks, including his wife and partner. When a personal note is delivered to the station, and the family of one of the young murder victims participate in a press release, Keller goes on the rampage with a gun at the young boy's funeral. During a shootout, Rivers is gunned down. Taylor wonders if she pushed him too far.
11	5	"What Price a Child: Part 1"	Alex Pillai	Mike Cullen	21 May 1998	N/A
Creegan and Taylor investigate when a young boy is snatched from the back garden of his parents' house. The search leads to Annie Jordan, who claims to be the boy's biological mother – and that she sold the boy to a dealer who internationally trades in children. As the team discover links to a paedophile ring, Creegan has to deal with personal tragedies of his own when a relative of a murder victim tries to kill his ex-wife and children by setting fire to their house.
12	6	"What Price a Child: Part 2"	Alex Pillai	Mike Cullen	28 May 1998	N/A
Taylor heads to Romania to collect a child whilst remaining undercover, and as the ring is threatened to be blown apart, the suspects make a break for it. As baby trader Reggie Hansen agrees to give evidence in court, Creegan is left devastated when Annie Jordan is shot and murdered in the passenger seat of his car by maniac Mark Hawkins. Creegan then has to choose whether or not to get justice for Annie or do the right thing and bring Hawkins in to custody.

=== Series 3 (1999) ===
No. overall	No. in series	Title	Directed by	Written by	Original release date	UK viewers (millions)
13	1	"Innocent: Part 1"	Bill Eagles	Tony Etchells	16 May 1999	9.99
Creegan is on sick leave when a man who he helped convict for the murder of his wife and another woman is released from prison. Creegan was always unsure of the conviction, until the man made a full confession. However, when the murders start again, Taylor brings the suspect straight back into custody. Creegan then leads a one-man show to prove he was right. The suspect then commits suicide following interrogation, and a fourth victim is found shortly afterwards.
14	2	"Innocent: Part 2"	Bill Eagles	Tony Etchells	23 May 1999	9.09
As Creegan continues to trail the killer, tragedy strikes as he leaves his hotel to find that the killer's next victim is none other than Rivers. As Creegan and Taylor struggle with the loss of their friend, Rivers' fiancé makes a plea for information as to who is responsible. Meanwhile, as the clues begin to piece themselves together, Creegan and Taylor then both come face to face with the killer and both have to restrain themselves from taking revenge for Rivers' death.
15	3	"A Fiery Death: Part 1"	David Moore	Sian Evans	30 May 1999	7.32
A serial killer who is burning the bodies of his victims to a crisp is operating in Ellendon. Meanwhile, Enwright introduces junior DC Martin Simmons to the team, much to the dismay of Creegan, who takes an instant dislike to him. As another victim of the killer turns up, Creegan realises that all of the murders are linked to a psychiatric hospital which burnt to the ground in 1989. As Creegan tries to identify one of the victims from facial recognition alone, the brutality of the murders begins to increase.
16	4	"A Fiery Death: Part 2"	David Moore	Sian Evans	6 June 1999	8.19
Creegan and Taylor come closer to identifying the killer when a fourth victim, headteacher Claire Logan, is found dead. They soon realise that victim Debbie Lewis' best friend, Lyn Sotherby, is none other than Susan Etchells in disguise, and they soon track her down to a disused hospital in Lincolnshire, where she has another victim ready and waiting. Creegan then puts himself on the line to secure the safety of the hostage, much to Taylor's dismay.
