= Kris Hitchen =

English actor

- Born: 28 April 1974 (age 52); Salford, England
- Occupation: Actor
- Years active: 2001, 2016–present
- Spouse: Sherry Hitchen (m. 1997)
- Children: 1

Kristian Bartholomew Hitchen (born 1974) is an English actor, best known for his role in the Ken Loach directed feature Sorry We Missed You for which he received a nomination for best actor at the British Independent Film Awards.

== Career ==
Born in Salford on 28 April 1974, Hitchen studied dancing as a child and tried to break into acting after leaving school but, after meeting his wife, he left the industry and started a plumbing business.

He returned to acting after visiting a retreat just before his 40th birthday and had small roles in 4 O'Clock Club and Coronation Street before landing the part of Ricky in Ken Loach's Sorry We Missed You. He has since appeared in Anne Boleyn as the Duke of Norfolk, The Long Shadow, Trigger Point and the film Speak No Evil alongside James McAvoy.

== Filmography ==
=== Film ===
| Year | Title | Role | Notes | Ref. |
|---|---|---|---|---|
| 2001 | The Navigators | Other Worker | Credited as Chris Hitchens | |
| 2019 | Sorry We Missed You | Ricky Turner | | |
| 2021 | The War Below | Harold Stockford | | |
| 2022 | Great Yarmouth: Provisional Figures | Richard | | |
| 2023 | Unmoored | Mark | | |
| 2024 | Speak No Evil | Mike | | |
| 2025 | Gone Fishing | Pete | Short | |

=== Television ===
| Year | Title | Role | Notes | Ref. |
|---|---|---|---|---|
| 2016 | 4 O'Clock Club | Sergeant | Episode: "Zombie"; Credited as Kristian Hitchen | |
| 2017 | Coronation Street | Engineer | 1 episode | |
| 2018 | Thick As Steves' | Steven | Television film | |
| 2020 | The Letter for the King | Ardoc | 6 episodes | |
| 2021 | Anne Boleyn | Duke of Norfolk | 3 episodes | |
| 2021 | The North Water | Barraclough | Episode: "Behold the Man" | |
| 2021 | Crime | Robert Ellis | Episode #1.4 | |
| 2022 | Four Lives | Tom | 3 episodes | |
| 2022, 2024 | Trigger Point | John Hudson | 6 episodes | |
| 2023 | The Reckoning | Hospital Priest | Episode #1.4 | |
| 2023 | The Long Shadow | D.C. John Nunn | 7 episodes | |
| 2024 | Protection | Jimmy McLennan | 2 episodes | |
| 2025 | Lynley | D.I. Derek Horwood | 2 episodes | |
