= Sorry We Missed You =

2019 film by Ken Loach

- Film poster
- Directed by: Ken Loach
- Written by: Paul Laverty
- Produced by: Rebecca O'Brien
- Starring: Kris Hitchen; Debbie Honeywood; Rhys Stone; Katie Proctor
- Cinematography: Robbie Ryan
- Edited by: Jonathan Morris
- Music by: George Fenton
- Production companies: Sixteen Films; BBC Films; BE TV; BFI Film Fund; Canal+; Ciné+; France 2 Cinéma; France Télévisions; Les Films du Fleuve; VOO; Why Not Productions; Wild Bunch
- Distributed by: Le Pacte (France); Cinéart (Belgium); Entertainment One (United Kingdom)
- Release dates: 16 May 2019 (Cannes); 23 October 2019 (France); 30 October 2019 (Belgium); 1 November 2019 (United Kingdom)
- Running time: 100 minutes
- Countries: United Kingdom; France; Belgium
- Language: English
- Box office: £6.3 million

Sorry We Missed You is a 2019 drama film written by Paul Laverty and directed by Ken Loach, shot in Newcastle upon Tyne and surrounding areas.

Shortly after the 2008 financial crisis Ricky Turner, hopes self-employment as a UK delivery driver through the gig economy will solve the financial difficulties, he and his wife struggle with, to raise their family, but they get trapped in the vicious circle of labour exploitation.

The film was overall well-received by critics but performed poorly in the box office.

== Plot ==
Ricky Turner and his family have been fighting an uphill struggle against debt since the 2008 financial crisis.

With no education or professional training, Ricky seizes an opportunity to run a franchise as a self-employed delivery driver under the supervision of Maloney, a tough, no-nonsense employer. In order to afford a van for the job, Ricky convinces his wife Abby to sell the family car, even though she uses it in her work as a home care nurse.

For Ricky, the new job is a source of constant stress which he is not enjoying. He is always under pressure to make his deliveries in time and is fined if he is late or makes mistakes. Abby, as well, finds her work much more difficult without a car. Due to her demanding schedule, she frequently feels upset by the lack of time she is allowed to spend with her patients.

During this period, Ricky's rebellious son Seb skips school and often gets into trouble spraying graffiti. After a fight with his parents, Seb angrily tags over the family portraits during the night. When Ricky cannot find the keys to his van the next morning, he blames Seb. Seb denies any wrongdoing, but Ricky hits him at the end of a heated argument. Later Liza Jane, Seb's younger sister tearfully admits that she hid the keys as she blames Ricky's job for the family's problems.

Back at work, Ricky is robbed and brutally assaulted when making deliveries. While in the waiting room at hospital, Maloney phones him and explains that he is facing fines of over £1,000 as his barcode scanner was destroyed in the assault. As Seb finally warms up and re-joins the family, a desperate and grievously injured Ricky drives off to work in tears as his family begs him to not leave.

== Cast ==
- Kris Hitchen as Ricky Turner
- Debbie Honeywood as Abby Turner
- Rhys Stone as Seb Turner
- Katie Proctor as Liza Jane Turner
- Ross Brewster as Maloney
- Charlie Richmond as Henry
- Julian Ions as Freddie
- Sheila Dunkerley as Rosie
- Maxie Peters as Robert
- Christopher John Slater as Ben
- Heather Wood as Mollie
- Alberto Dumba as Harpoon
- Natalia Stonebanks as Roz
- Jordan Collard as Dodge
- Dave Turner as Magpie

== Production ==
Principal photography began in Newcastle upon Tyne and the surrounding areas in September 2018.

== Release ==
The film was selected to compete for the Palme d'Or at the 2019 Cannes Film Festival. Despite having a broken arm in a sling, the 82-year-old Loach appeared at Cannes to promote the film and announce that it would be his final film to compete at the festival. At the 10th Magritte Awards, Sorry We Missed You received the Magritte Award for Best Foreign Film in Coproduction. At the 13th Gaudí Awards, it won the Gaudí Award for Best European Film.

== Reception ==
=== Box office ===
The film grossed £6.3 million.

=== Critical reception ===
On Rotten Tomatoes, the film holds an approval rating of 88% based on 155 reviews, with an average rating of 7.8/10. The site's critical consensus reads "Sorry We Missed You may strike some as tending toward the righteously didactic, but director Ken Loach's passionate approach remains effective." Metacritic, which uses a weighted average, assigned the film a score of 82 out of 100, based on 26 critics, indicating "universal acclaim".

David Rooney in The Hollywood Reporter wrote that the film "is an expertly judged and profoundly humane movie, made without frills or fuss but startlingly direct in its emotional depiction of the tough stuff that is the fiber of so many ordinary lives."

Peter Bradshaw in The Guardian believed it was superior to Loach's previous film I, Daniel Blake (2016), which won the Palme d'Or at Cannes. Bradshaw wrote: "it is more dramatically varied and digested, with more light and shade in its narrative progress and more for the cast to do collectively. I was hit in the solar plexus by this movie, wiped out by the simple honesty and integrity of the performances." The review in The Times praised the performance of newcomer Debbie Honeywood as Abby, who was cast after a talent search of non-professionals. Contributor Kevin Maher believed the film should have concentrated on her character instead of Ricky, Abby's husband.

Geoffrey Macnab wrote in The Independent that Loach's film "captures brilliantly the alienation and existential anguish that its main characters feel. There is nothing they can do to help themselves. The more they fight to change their circumstances, the worse those circumstances become." Macnab commented that Loach and his screenwriter Laverty "pursue their story to its logical conclusion, ending the film in a way that is both ingenious and devastating."

Owen Gleiberman of Variety writes: "Loach stages all of this with supreme confidence and flow" leading to "a fraught, touching, and galvanizing movie." Raphael Abrahams, in his review for the Financial Times, states: "In the end credits he [Loach] gives thanks to those drivers whose testimony informed the film but who wished to remain anonymous. He is their much-needed voice and remains that of our moral conscience."

Trevor Johnston of British film publication Sight & Sound wrote "While Sorry We Missed You may not be as sentimentally affecting as I, Daniel Blake, it delivers a more nuanced, troubling and provocative state-of-the-nation address. As such, it’s surely among Loach and Laverty’s most sinewy efforts."
