= Elliot James Langridge =

English actor (born 1987)

- Born: 5 September 1987 (age 38); Kingston upon Thames, England
- Occupation: Actor
- Years active: 1995–present

Elliot James Langridge (born 5 September 1987) is an English actor, known for the lead roles in Northern Soul (2014), and Raindance Best UK Feature Film, We the Kings (2019).

== Personal life ==
Langridge was born in Kingston upon Thames. He struggled with dyslexia.

== Filmography ==
Year	Title	Role	Refs
2020	The War Below	George	
2019	The Intergalactic Adventures of Max Cloud	Jake	
2019	Killers Anonymous	Ben	
2019	Peripheral	Dylan	
2018	We the Kings	Jack	
2017	Instrument of War	Reed 'Whit' Whitaker	
2017	Habit	Michael	
2017	Beautiful Devils	Ivan	
2016	Infinite	Digger	
2016	Let's Be Evil	Darby	
2014	Northern Soul (film)	John Clark	
2007	Harry Potter and the Order of the Phoenix	(uncredited) Boy on bike	

== Television ==
Year	Title	Role	Refs
2015	Vera (ITV)	Ryan	
2009–2010	Hollyoaks	Dave Colburn / Dave Cohen	
2009	Genie in the House (Nickelodeon)	Blake	
2008	The Bill (ITV)	Kieron Jordan	
2008	Primeval (ITV)	Blake	
