= Help (2021 TV film) =

British television film

- Promotional poster
- Written by: Jack Thorne
- Directed by: Marc Munden
- Starring: Jodie Comer; Stephen Graham; Ian Hart; Sue Johnston; Lesley Sharp; Angela Griffin; David Hayman; Cathy Tyson
- Country of origin: United Kingdom
- Original language: English

Production
- Producer: Jenny Frayn
- Cinematography: Mark Wolf
- Editor: Simon Smith
- Running time: 98 minutes
- Production companies: Channel Four Television Corporation; The Forge

Original release
- Network: Channel 4
- Release: 16 September 2021

Help is a 2021 British drama television film about the COVID-19 pandemic in the United Kingdom, written by Jack Thorne and directed by Marc Munden. It follows Sarah (Jodie Comer), a young health care assistant who starts working at a care home in Liverpool, where she cares for Tony (Stephen Graham), a middle-aged man who has early-onset Alzheimer's disease; when the pandemic hits the UK, both their worlds are completely transformed. It premiered on Channel 4 on 16 September 2021.

== Plot ==
In 2019, Sarah begins working as a care assistant at Bright Sky Homes, a care home in Liverpool. She is good at connecting with the residents, in particular a middle-aged man called Tony, who has early-onset Alzheimer's disease. Tony frequently walks out of the building and wanders the streets to try and go to his mother's house, forgetting that she has died and their home now belongs to another family.

The work load is tough, but everyone's world is turned upside down when the COVID-19 pandemic hits the UK in March 2020. Like most other care homes across the country, Bright Sky suffers a COVID-19 outbreak amongst residents. This is made all the worse by a severe lack of personal protective equipment (PPE) with supplies in NHS hospitals being prioritised above homes.

One night, when Sarah is left as the only carer on duty, Bright Sky resident Kenny suffers a serious coughing fit. Sarah calls the COVID-19 hotline, as well as NHS 111, but no ambulances are available in the area. Angry and frightened, Sarah wakes up Tony, who is also Kenny's best friend. He manages to turn Kenny over, but he is still in a bad way.

Later, Sarah finds out that Tony has been given new medicine by Steve, the head of the home. She confronts Steve, who tells her that Tony's GP had insisted upon the change. Enraged, Sarah takes Tony out of Bright Sky and takes him to a caravan owned by her family, where they stay for twelve days. Sarah is found by her dad Bob, who commends her actions by asking her if she needs any supplies. Whilst playing Shithead, Tony and Sarah are found by the police, who received a tip-off from some dog walkers who spotted them. Tony is returned to Bright Sky and Sarah is arrested.

Sarah, in the back of a police car, breaks the fourth wall and warns the audience against turning a blind eye to the needs of others in society, from those in social care to those using food banks. The film ends with statistics about deaths in UK care homes at the beginning of the pandemic and the insufficient amount of PPE the government provided.

== Cast ==
- Jodie Comer as Sarah
- Stephen Graham as Tony
- Ian Hart as Steve
- Lesley Sharp as Gaynor
- Andrew Schofield as Bob
- Cathy Tyson as Polly
- Angela Griffin as Tori
- Arthur Hughes as Tim
- Sue Johnston as Gloria
- Steve Garti as Kenny
- Ellis Howard as Robbie
- Alicya Eyo as June
- David Hayman as Hercules

== Production ==
=== Background ===
On 20 November 2020, Channel 4 announced that Jodie Comer and Stephen Graham would star in a television drama film produced by The Forge about the COVID-19 pandemic and its impact in the UK, with Jack Thorne writing the script and Marc Munden signing on as director. Speaking about the project, Thorne said: "About two years ago Stephen Graham came to me with an idea to write something for him and Jodie Comer. I tried to think of something and got nothing. Then this crisis happened, and we saw care homes getting squashed and battered by the government. It's been both a long process and a short one, trying to find a way to tell this story, the amazing thing has been sharing in working out the story with Stephen, Jodie, the amazing Marc Munden, Beth Willis and everyone at the Forge and Channel 4."

Thorne's original intention was to write a story about "different aspects of care homes and a different aspect of care home politics", but he was told to change it by The Forge founder George Faber. "I was a bit scared of writing about Covid," Thorne told Empire magazine's Pilot TV. "I didn't really want to write a Covid drama. But then the more stuff I read, the more important it seemed to be."

=== Filming ===
Help was mostly shot in Liverpool, while some scenes were also filmed on Thurstaston Beach on the Wirral Peninsula, and in a former care home in Maghull.

The third part of the film, where Sarah is alone on the night shift and desperately tries to get in touch with the emergency services, was done in a single take that lasted over 26 minutes. During a press Q&A, Comer admitted that this sequence was "probably the most difficult" scene to shoot throughout filming. "Marc [Munden] really pushed me on that," she said. "I remember there was a moment, we'd done this whole take and I was so in my own head. And I was like, 'I think we've got it, we've got it, we've got it,' and Marc was like, 'No, no, no – we're gonna do one more,' and I was like, 'Oh okay'. I was so in my own head at this point and we did it again and the moment we got in that second take, we never ever would have got in the first. And I think Marc really was phenomenal at that, knowing just when to push you that little bit more. So I think that was probably the most difficult for all of us really because we all really had to huddle together and work as a team."

== Reception ==
Help was acclaimed by critics. Carol Midgley of The Times gave the film five out of five stars and called it "a shaming nightmare [that] all ministers should see". Lauren Morris of the Radio Times gave it four out of five stars, praising the film for "hit[ting] home the traumatic experience many caregivers would have gone through whilst trying to look after vulnerable care home residents throughout the pandemic" and praised the performances of Graham and Comer.

The Independent gave the film four stars, similarly praising the cast and storytelling, with reviewer Ed Cummings remarking, "Help [is] at its best when it trusts its cast with the little unremembered acts of kindness and love that endured despite it all. With this subject matter, Graham and Comer are all the assistance you need." In a four-star review, The Guardian dubbing it "evocative and harrowing", but had issues with the resolution. The Daily Telegraph's Anita Singh gave Help four out of five stars and was particularly praising of Sarah's "hellish night shift", which Singh called "a virtuoso piece of directing from Marc Munden".

Despite the critical praise, Thorne was unsatisfied that the production did not seem to largely change public opinion. In 2025, he noted: "Care work is still incredibly badly treated, nothing has changed … I really wanted it to be Cathy Come Home and it didn't do that."

=== Awards ===
On 8 May 2022, for her portrayal of Sarah in Help, Jodie Comer received a British Academy Television Award in the Lead Actress category, her second such award. In her speech, she thanked caregivers of the Dementia Society. Actor Stephen Graham, who played the role of Tony, was nominated for Lead Actor, and Help was nominated for Best Single Drama.

Year	Award	Category	Nominee	Result	Ref.
2021	Rose d'Or	Drama	Help	Won	
2022	British Academy Television Awards	Best Single Drama	Help	Nominated	
2022	British Academy Television Awards	Best Actor	Stephen Graham	Nominated	
2022	British Academy Television Awards	Best Actress	Jodie Comer	Won	
2022	British Academy Television Awards	Best Supporting Actress	Cathy Tyson	Won	
2022	Royal Television Society Programme Awards	Single Drama	Help	Won	
2022	Royal Television Society Programme Awards	Writing: Drama	Jack Thorne	Nominated	
2022	Royal Television Society Craft & Design Awards	Director – Drama	Marc Munden	Nominated	
2022	Seoul International Drama Awards	Grand Prize (Daesang)	Help	Won	
2022	Seoul International Drama Awards	Best Actor	Stephen Graham	Won	
2022	Seoul International Drama Awards	Best Actress	Jodie Comer	Won	
2022	International Emmy Awards	Best TV Movie or Miniseries	Help	Won	
