= The Voorman Problem =

2011 film

- Film poster
- Directed by: Mark Gill
- Written by: Mark Gill; Baldwin Li
- Based on: number9dream by David Mitchell
- Produced by: Baldwin Li; Lee Thomas
- Starring: Martin Freeman; Tom Hollander
- Cinematography: Phil Wood
- Edited by: Mark Gill; Baldwin Li
- Music by: Mark Gill
- Release dates: 1 October 2011 (Warsaw Film Festival); 25 April 2013 (United Kingdom)
- Running time: 13 minutes
- Country: United Kingdom
- Language: English

The Voorman Problem is a 2011 British short film directed by Mark Gill, who also co-wrote the screenplay and edited the film with producer Baldwin Li, who also wrote the score. It is adapted from "Panopticon", a film within a story from the 2001 novel number9dream by David Mitchell, with Martin Freeman starring as a prison psychiatrist, and Tom Hollander as his patient.

The film premiered at the 2011 Warsaw Film Festival. It was nominated for the Academy Award for Best Live Action Short Film and the BAFTA Award for Best Short Film.

== Plot ==
Dr. Williams (played by Martin Freeman) is hired by Governor Bentley (Simon Griffiths) to work as a prison psychiatrist after "The War in the East" has produced a doctor shortage. Williams is informed about the Voorman problem; a prisoner named Voorman (Tom Hollander) is convinced that he is a god and has convinced the rest of the prisoners who spend all day chanting in worship. It is unclear what Voorman's crime is due to a computer malfunction.

Williams interviews a straitjacketed Voorman in a locked room in the prison. Voorman calmly explains that he is a god, and that he created the world exactly nine days ago. He brushes off all evidence to the contrary by saying he made evidence that the world was older including Dr William's memories of a life. Meaning that everyone on earth has fake memories up till nine days ago. He also says he must keep imagining the world or it disappears and it's exhausting. When Dr Williams objects to all his claims, Voorman suggests a test of his powers. He will eliminate Belgium as proof he is a god.

At home a frustrated Williams tells his wife about the case. He laughingly brings up the claim that Voorman will eliminate Belgium. His wife is confused, having no idea what Belgium is. Williams attempts to show her Belgium in an atlas but finds it is gone and replaced with a body of water called "Walloon Lagoon."

Back at the prison, Williams is baffled by the lack of any evidence of Belgium, but refuses to believe in Voorman's divinity. He also asks why a god would be in prison. Voorman says he likes prison and finds the inhabitants more amusing than a congregation of believers. He then states that he made humans to be imaginative purely to amuse himself and he finds wars like the one in the east “comedy gold”. Williams is disgusted by this attitude. He states that whilst he is not a religious man, he wonders what kind of god would find war amusing. Voorman coldly says a bored one. He also states that Williams is not a religious man is why he chose him. Voorman expresses again his exhaustion with being a god and says the two are going to switch places. Williams, still not convinced, begins to protest that he will not be fooled by Voorman's tricks. He does not even get to finish his sentence as Voorman starts to whistle loudly and in a flash the two have switched places, Voorman dressed as the well dressed doctor, and Williams disheveled and in a straitjacket. Williams shouts in shock. Voorman mockingly mimics a psychiatrist tone of voice saying if he cannot have a conversation without shouting he will terminate the interview. Williams calls for the guards and Voorman starts to leave stating that it is of no use. As he leaves, Voorman advises Williams to "watch North Korea."

Voorman leaves the room as the sounds of the prisoners chanting get louder.

== Cast ==
- Martin Freeman as Dr Williams
- Tom Hollander as Voorman
- Elisabeth Gray as Mrs. Williams
- Simon Griffiths as Governor Bentley
