= Masahisa Fukase =

Japanese photographer (1934–2012)

Masahisa Fukase (Note: 深瀬 昌久, Fukase Masahisa) (25 February 1934 – 9 June 2012) was a Japanese photographer, celebrated for his work depicting his domestic life with his wife Yōko Wanibe and his regular visits to his parents' small-town photo studio in Hokkaido. He is best known for his 1986 photo book Ravens (also printed as Karasu and The Solitude of Ravens), which in 2010 was selected by the British Journal of Photography as the best photo book published between 1986 and 2009.

Since his death in 2012 there has been a revival of interest in Fukase's photography, with new books and exhibitions appearing that emphasize the breadth and originality of his art.

== Life and career ==
=== Background and family ===
Masahisa Fukase was born on 25 February 1934 in Bifuka, Hokkaido. His family ran a successful photo studio in the small northern town. Despite permanently moving to Tokyo in the 1950s to pursue his education and then career, Fukase retained strong emotional ties to his birthplace and family. Throughout the 1970s and 1980s he returned regularly to Bifuka to make large-format family portraits, a project that was eventually published in the book Kazoku (Family) in 1991.

=== Early career and self-representation ===
Among Fukase's earliest bodies of artistic work is Kill the Pigs of 1961, consisting of dark and often gruesome photographs made over the course of repeated visits to the Shibaura slaughterhouse in Tokyo mixed with photographs of two intertwined naked bodies (the photographer and his wife) Subsequently, he experimented with various journalistic and artistic styles, contributing dozens of photo essays to such magazines as Camera Mainichi, Asahi Camera, and Asahi Journal. His first photobook, Yūgi, was published in 1971 and includes numerous photographs of his first wife, Yukiyo Kawakami, and his second wife, Yōko Wanibe. Although the book was described at the time as a work of "self-representation", it contains no discernible photographs of Fukase himself. Accordingly, it can be considered the photographer's first attempt to describe his own passionate, self-indulgent, and sometimes violent life by indirect means. Fukase's next book, Yōko (1978), is a successor to the first in that it is another attempt to "show" his life through representations of a female 'other'.

=== Karasu (Ravens) ===
Fukase's Karasu (Ravens) was shot between 1976 and 1982 in the wake of his divorce from Yōko Wanibe, and during the early period of his marriage to the writer Rika Mikanagi. It extends his experimentation with oblique and metaphorical self-expression in the A Play photo essays of the early '70s – especially Natsu no nikki (Summer Journal) of December 1972 and Fuyu no nikki (Winter Journal) of June 1973. Indeed, Fukase's original title for the series was Tonpokuki or "Winter Journal". The photographs of ravens and other rather bleak subjects that constitute Karasu were taken in Hokkaido, Kanazawa, and Tokyo. The project originated as an eight-part series for the magazine Camera Mainichi (1976–82), and these photo essays reveal that Fukase experimented with colour film, multiple exposure printing, and narrative text as part of the development of the Karasu concept. Beginning in 1976, exhibitions based on this new body of work brought Fukase widespread recognition in Japan, and subsequently in Europe and the United States. The book was published in 1986 (by Sōkyūsha) and this original edition of Ravens soon became one of the most respected and sought-after Japanese photobooks of the post-war era. Subsequent editions were published in 1991 (Bedford Arts), 2008 (Rat Hole Gallery), and 2017 (Mack). The heavily autobiographical approach of Karasu has its origins in Fukase's foundational photo essay, Hyōten (Freezing Point) of 1961, but it pushes the central themes of isolation and tragedy to new levels of depth and abstraction. Technically, the photographs of ravens were very difficult to achieve, with Fukase having to focus his camera on the small, moving black subjects in almost total darkness. Setting correct exposures was equally challenging. According to Fukase's former assistant, photographer Masato Seto, printing some of the Karasu photographs required complicated burning and dodging. In 1976, at the outset of the project, Fukase stated in Camera Mainichi: "I'm wishing that I could stop this world. This act [of photography] may represent my own revenge play against life, and perhaps that is what I enjoy most." By the project's end in 1982, Fukase wrote enigmatically that he had "become a raven".

In 2010, a panel of five experts (Gerry Badger, Ute Eskilden, Chris Killip, Jeffrey Ladd, and Yōko Sawada) convened by the British Journal of Photography selected Karasu as the best photobook of 1986–2009.

=== 1992 accident and Bukubuku ===
In 1992, Fukase suffered a traumatic brain injury from a fall down the steep steps of his favourite bar—Nami—in the Golden Gai area of Shinjuku, Tokyo. This injury left him in a coma, which he would remain in until his death in 2012. Earlier that year Miyako Ishiuchi had photographed Fukase nude for her book Chromosome XY (1995). Some of the images from that session were published in the magazine Brutus in January 1995. Ishiuchi has said that Fukase was almost alone among Japanese male photographers in agreeing to pose nude for her camera. In 2004 the Masahisa Fukase Trust edited and had published two photobooks Hysteric Twelve and Bukubuku, based on bodies of work Fukase had completed before his debilitating fall. The photographs contained in Bukubuku, made in a bathtub with an underwater camera, have come to be regarded as Fukase's last great work, a whimsical if somewhat morbid game of solitaire that charts new territory for the photographic self-portrait.

== Death and legacy ==
Fukase died on 9 June 2012. In 2015, two exhibitions designed to highlight some of his lesser-known work were co-ordinated by the Masahisa Fukase Archives. These were From Window which formed part of the Another Language: 8 Japanese Photographers exhibition at Rencontres d’Arles, France, and The Incurable Egoist at Diesel Art Gallery, Tokyo. Fukase's complete set of 30 Bukubuku prints was exhibited for the first time since 1992 at the 2016 Tate Modern show Performing for the Camera.

In 2024 a biographical drama film about Fukase was released, titled Ravens. The film was directed by Mark Gill and starred Tadanobu Asano.

== Selected exhibitions ==
- Black Sun: The Eyes of Four. Museum of Modern Art, Oxford, England, December 1985 – February 1986; Serpentine Gallery, London, April–May 1986; Philadelphia Museum of Art, Philadelphia, August–October 1986; University of Iowa Museum of Art, March–May 1987; San Diego Museum of Art, San Diego, September–October 1987; Baltimore Museum of Art, Baltimore, August–October 1988.
- The Unpublished Works. Stephen Wirtz Gallery, San Francisco, May–June 2001.
- Solitude of Ravens. Michael Hoppen Gallery, London, 2016.

== Books ==
- Yūgi (遊戯) = Homo Ludence. (Note: Within this list, italicized Western titles following an equals sign are alternative titles that appear on or in the books.) Eizō no Gendai 4. Tokyo: Chūōkōronsha, 1971.
- Yōko (洋子) = Yohko. Sonorama Shashin Sensho 8. Tokyo: Asahi Sonorama, 1978.
- Biba! Sasuke (ビバ！ サスケ, Viva Sasuke (Note: Within this list, unitalicized Western titles within parentheses are merely nonce translations made for this article; they do not appear on or in the books.)). Tokyo: Pet-Life-sha, 1979.
- Sasuke, Itoshiki Neko yo (サスケ、いとしき猫よ, Sasuke, My Dear Cat). Tokyo: Seinen-shokan, 1979.
- Neko no Mugi Wara Boshi (猫の麦わら帽子, The Straw-hat Cat). Tokyo: Bunka Shuppankyoku, 1979.
- Kūkai to Kōyasan (空海と高野山, Kūkai and Mount Kōya). Nihon no Seiiki 2. Tokyo: Kōsei Shuppansha, 1982. ISBN 4-333-01042-X.
- Karasu (鴉, Ravens). Yokohama: Sōkyūsha, 1986. In Japanese and English.
- Kazoku (家族, Family). Tokyo: IPC, 1991. ISBN 4-87198-832-5.
- The Solitude of Ravens: A Photographic Narrative. San Francisco: Bedford Arts, 1991. ISBN 0-938491-23-7. US reprint of the 1986 book, in English only.
- Chichi no Kioku (父の記憶) = Memories of Father. Tokyo: IPC, 1991. ISBN 4-87198-833-3.
- Fukase Masahisa (深瀬昌久). Nihon no Shashinka 34. Tokyo: Iwanami Shoten, 1998. ISBN 4-00-008374-0.
- Bukubuku (家族, Bubbling). Tokyo: Hysteric Glamour, 2004.
- Fukase Masahisa (深瀬昌久). Hysteric Twelve. Tokyo: Hysteric Glamour, 2004.
- Karasu (鴉) = The Solitude of Ravens. Tokyo: Rat Hole Gallery, 2008. Reprint of the 1986 book, with afterword in Japanese and English.
- To (屠) = Slaughter. Kamakura: Super Labo, 2015. ISBN 978-4-905052-81-4. (Note: Super Labo's page about the booklet is here.)
- Wonderful Days. Tokyo: Roshin Books, 2015. ISBN 978-4-9907230-3-3. Edition of 800 copies. (Note: Roshin Books' page about Wonderful Days is here.)
- Hibi. London: Mack, 2016. ISBN 9781910164457. Photographs of the surface of streets, printed and painted over for his Private Scenes '92 solo exhibition at a Nikon Salon in Tokyo in 1992.
- Afterword. Tokyo: Roshin, 2016. ISBN 978-4-9907230-5-7. Edition of 900 copies; also, a "second edition" (with the same ISBN) of 900 copies. Text in Japanese and English. (Note: Roshin Books' page about the first edition of Afterword is here; its page about the second edition is here.)
- Ravens. London: Mack, 2017. ISBN 978-1-910164-83-9. With the original (1986) afterword by Akira Hasegawa and a new text by Tomo Kosuga (both in English and Japanese).
- Masahisa Fukase. Paris: Editions Xavier Barral, 2018. ISBN 978-2365112024 Edited by Tomo Kosuga with introduction by Simon Baker
- Kill The Pig. the(M) / Ibasho, 2021. With an essay by Tomo Kosuga in Japanese and English. Edition of 1000 copies.

== Selected photo essays ==
- "Danchi shunpū [Spring Wind in the Danchi]: A Play 4," Camera Mainichi, April 1971, pages 9–23.
- "Kyōri [Hometown]: A Play 5," Camera Mainichi, October 1971: pages 110–21.
- "Natsu no nikki [Summer Journal]: A Play 7," Camera Mainichi, December 1972: pages 76–82.
- "Fuyu no nikki [Winter Journal]: A Play 8," Camera Mainichi, June 1973: 119–27.
- "Karasu 1", Camera Mainichi, October 1976, pages 111–115.
- "Karasu 2", Camera Mainichi, November 1976, pages 85–99.
- "Karasu 3", Camera Mainichi, January 1978, pages 133–41.
- "Karasu 4", Camera Mainichi, June 1978, pages 95–100.
- "Karasu 5", Camera Mainichi, June 1979, pages 100–113.
- "Karasu 6", Camera Mainichi, March 1980, pages 7–17.
- "Karasu 7: Tokyo hen", Camera Mainichi, July 1981, pages 71–9.
- "Karasu--Shūshō", Camera Mainichi, November 1982, pages 120–139 and 202–203.
