= Ravens (2024 film) =

- DVD cover
- Directed by: Mark Gill
- Written by: Mark Gill
- Produced by: Orian Williams; Cyril Cadars; Mark Gill; Megumi Ishii; Hideki Kawamura; Hiroyasu Nagata; David Barrera; Johanna Horn; Henry Gillet
- Starring: Tadanobu Asano; Sôsuke Ikematsu; Kumi Takiuchi; Kanji Furutachi; Gō Jibiki
- Cinematography: Fernando Ruiz
- Edited by: Chika Konishi; Frank Moderna
- Music by: Paul Lay; Théophile Moussouni
- Release date: October 30, 2024 (Tokyo)
- Countries: France; United Kingdom; Japan; Spain; Belgium
- Language: Japanese

Ravens is a 2024 Japanese-language biographical drama film written and directed by Mark Gill. The film explores the life and work of the acclaimed Japanese photographer Masahisa Fukase, whose art was heavily influenced by themes of isolation and personal tragedy.

== Plot ==
Set in the later years of Masahisa Fukase's life, the film delves into his tumultuous relationships and creative struggles. It highlights the making of his seminal photographic work, Karasu ("Ravens"), which remains one of the most influential photobooks in history. The narrative weaves between his personal life, his failing marriage to Yoko, and his reflections on loneliness and artistic obsession.

== Cast ==
- Tadanobu Asano as Masahisa Fukase
- Sôsuke Ikematsu as Morio Shoda
- Kumi Takiuchi as Yoko Fukase
- Kanji Furutachi as Sukezõ Fukase
- Gô Jibiki as Toshiteru Fukase

== Production ==
The film was directed and written by Mark Gill, with a score composed by Paul Lay and Théophile Moussouni. Cinematography was handled by Fernando Ruiz, and editing was done by Chika Konishi and Frank Moderna.

== Release ==
The film was screened at Tokyo International Film Festival 2024 and won the Audience Award at the Austin Film Festival, and the Committee Award at the Balinale 2025. "Ravens" was also selected for the 2024 edition of the Red Sea Film Festival. It also made it to the main competition slate of the 28th Málaga Film Festival.

== Reception ==
The film received positive reviews by Variety, the Japan Times and Indie Cinema Magazine.

== See also ==
- Masahisa Fukase
- Photography in Japan
