= England Is Mine =

2017 film by Mark Gill

- Film poster
- Directed by: Mark Gill
- Screenplay by: Mark Gill; William Thacker
- Produced by: Alan Graves; Tom Harberd; Phil Hunt; Orion Lee; Baldwin Li; Roger O'Donnell; Brian Perera; Compton Ross; Gregory P. Shockro; Duncan Western; Orian Williams; Tim Yasui
- Starring: Jack Lowden; Jessica Brown Findlay; Laurie Kynaston
- Cinematography: Nicholas D. Knowland
- Production company: Honlodge Productions
- Distributed by: Entertainment One
- Release dates: 2 July 2017 (Edinburgh International Film Festival); 4 August 2017 (United Kingdom)
- Running time: 94 minutes
- Country: United Kingdom
- Language: English

England Is Mine is a 2017 British biographical drama film, based on the early years of singer Morrissey, before he formed the Smiths in 1982 with Johnny Marr. Originally titled Steven (Morrissey's first name), the title of the film comes from a lyric in the Smiths' song "Still Ill": "England is mine, and it owes me a living." The film is an unauthorised portrayal of Morrissey's pre-success years. It is Mark Gill's feature-length directorial debut, as well as Jodie Comer's first feature film appearance.

The film stars Jack Lowden as Morrissey, and was directed and co-written by Mark Gill. It co-stars Jessica Brown Findlay as Linder Sterling and Laurie Kynaston as Marr. It premiered at the closing gala of the Edinburgh Film Festival on 2 July 2017, and was released in the United Kingdom on 4 August 2017, and in the United States on 25 August 2017.

== Plot ==
Young, introverted Steven Patrick Morrissey is a sullen, dissatisfied, and shy teen growing up in Manchester in the 1970s. Withdrawn and a loner, he goes out to listen to music at night and then submits letters and reviews to music newspapers. His father wants him to get a job, his mother wants him to follow his passion for writing, and Steven doesn't quite know what he wants to do. His new friend, artist Linder Sterling, inspires him to continue to write lyrics and urges him to start to perform, but she eventually moves to London. Forced to earn a living and fit in with society, Steven's frustrations and setbacks continue to mount. Although he writes some songs with guitarist Billy Duffy and tries his hand at singing and enjoys it, eventually Duffy breaks it off, and nothing substantially changes in his life, so Steven seems at the end of his tether. At the end of the film, guitarist Johnny Marr, with whom he would go on to form the Smiths, shows up on his doorstep in 1982.

== Cast ==
- Jack Lowden as Steven Morrissey
- Jessica Brown Findlay as Linder Sterling
- Laurie Kynaston as Johnny Marr
- Adam Lawrence as Billy Duffy
- Jodie Comer as Christine
- Katherine Pearce as Anji Hardie
- Peter McDonald as Peter Morrissey
- Simone Kirby as Elizabeth Morrissey
- Vivienne Bell as Jacqueline Morrissey
- Graeme Hawley as Mr Leonard

== Production ==
Jack Lowden, the star of the film, did not know much about Morrissey when he was cast. Director Mark Gill also discouraged Lowden from finding out too much about the singer, and banned him from reading his autobiography or watching old TV appearances, so that the character – a troubled and introverted teen before he started a band or became at all successful – could be played as written.

== Reception ==
On review aggregator Rotten Tomatoes, the film has an approval rating of 52% based on 65 reviews, with an average rating of 5.53/10. The website's critical consensus reads, "England Is Mine's smartly assembled cast and strong sense of place are often enough to compensate for this unauthorized biopic's distance from its subject." Metacritic, which uses a weighted average, assigned a score of 45 out of 100, based on 19 critics, indicating "mixed or average reviews".

Peter Bradshaw in The Guardian gave the film three out of five stars and wrote: "Morrissey gets the cuddly Billy Liar treatment in this weirdly generic movie about his early teen life in Manchester that sometimes seems to be straightforwardly channelling the kitchen-sink spirit of 60s British cinema that Morrissey famously adored – but with much less of the acid irony and alienation that he extracted from it." Owen Gleiberman in Variety stated: "England Is Mine just feels like a stopgap movie made by people who couldn't afford to get the rights to the Smiths' catalogue. The poster calls it a meditation 'on becoming Morrissey,' but it would be more accurate to describe it as a movie about waiting around dejectedly until there's nothing left to do but become Morrissey." Tim Robey in The Telegraph gave England Is Mine two out of four stars and wrote: "The film romanticises the ambitions hatched in male bedrooms and gives the embarrassing impression that's where all sincere art springs from. It's like being crushed in a vice of angst." Jeannette Catsoulis in The New York Times stated: "Skirting sexuality and absent Morrissey's music (the movie ends in 1982 as he and Johnny Marr are on the brink of forming the band), England Is Mine is a soggy schlep. But if you're among those who believe that great art rarely foments in the cheerfully well-adjusted, then this one's for you."

Alan Scherstuhl in the Village Voice praised the film's acting, and wrote: "'Are you going to sulk all day?' our hero gets asked just minutes into Mark Gill's England Is Mine. The remaining eighty-plus minutes of this muted, sometimes arresting drama concern a young man trying to find it in himself to sulk better." Jamie Neish wrote in CineVue: "Due to rights issues none of Morrissey's music is used. England Is Mine works far better as an evolution of a star pre-fame than anything else. That's not necessarily a bad thing – just different from what audiences may expect." Dave White in The Wrap opined that the film was best seen by true Morrissey fans: "For the millions of true believers out there ... the film provides a blissfully melancholy roll call of pleasures."

England Is Mine was nominated for the "Politiken's Audience Award" at the 2017 CPH:PIX. It was also nominated "Best Film" at the Edinburgh International Film Festival. At the Milan Film Festival, the film was nominated "Best Feature Film" in the "International Competition".
