= Accolade (play) =

1950 play written by Emlyn Williams

- Written by: Emlyn Williams
- Original language: English
- Genre: Drama
- Setting: London, present day

Premiere
- Date premiered: 31 July 1950
- Place premiered: Royal Court Theatre, Liverpool

Accolade is a 1950 play by the Welsh playwright Emlyn Williams. Accolade was first presented in London by H. M. Tennent Ltd, in association with Leland Hayward and Joshua Logan, at the Aldwych Theatre, on 7 September 1950, with Emlyn Williams as Will Trenting and a cast including Diana Churchill, Anthony Nicholls, Dora Bryan, John Cavanah and Noel Willman. It ran for 180 performances.

The play was revived in 2011 at the Finborough Theatre with a cast including Graham Seed, Aden Gillett and Saskia Wickham, and again in 2024, with a cast including Ayden Callaghan and Honeysuckle Weeks.

== Bibliography ==
- Wearing, J.P. The London Stage 1950-1959: A Calendar of Productions, Performers, and Personnel. Rowman & Littlefield, 2014.
