= Mark Gill =

English screenwriter and film director

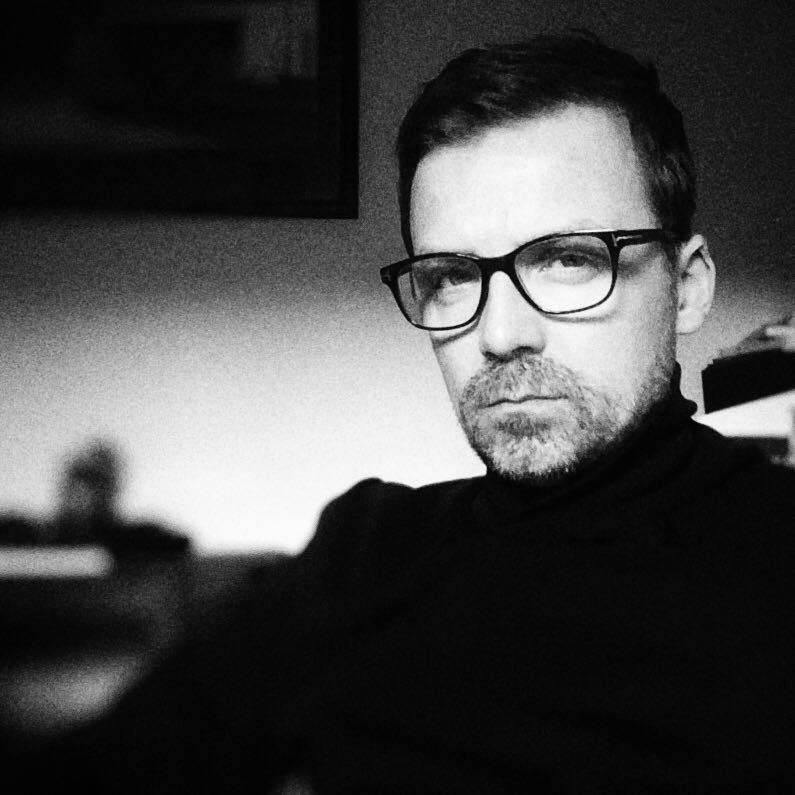
- Occupations: Screenwriter, director
- Years active: 2011–present
- Notable work: Ravens England Is Mine The Voorman Problem
- Website: www.markgill.co.uk

Mark Gill is an English screenwriter and film director. He is from Stretford in Manchester.

Gill graduated from University of Central Lancashire in 2007. Gill has won numerous awards, including a Royal Television Society Award. In 2014 Gill was nominated for an Academy Award for Best Live Action Short Film for his film The Voorman Problem, as well as receiving a BAFTA Award for Best Short Film nomination in 2013

Gill co-wrote and directed England Is Mine, a biopic based on the early life of Morrissey. It premiered at the closing gala of the Edinburgh Film Festival on 2 July 2017, and went into wide release in the UK in August 2017.

Gill's second feature, Ravens, a darkly surreal love story based on the life of Masahisa Fukase and his wife Yoko, was released in 2024. Ravens premiered at the Austin Film Festival in October 2024. Ravens stars Golden Globe winning (Shōgun) actor Tadanobu Asano. Ravens premiered at the 2024 Austin Film Festival and won the Marquee Film Audience Award.
