= List of University of Kent people =

A list of people related to the University of Kent.

== Officers ==
Several positions did not technically exist prior to the formal incorporation of the University by approval of its Charter on 4 January 1965. However several were appointed beforehand as nominal "officer designates", performing the same duties. Princess Marina, Duchess of Kent was not formally installed as Chancellor until 30 March 1966.

=== Chancellors ===
- 1963–1968 Princess Marina, Duchess of Kent
- 1970–1990 Jo Grimond (later Baron Grimond) – see University of Kent at Canterbury Chancellor election, 1970
- 1990–1995 Sir Robert Horton
- 1996–2006 Sir Crispin Tickell
- 2006–2014 Sir Robert Worcester
- 2014–2024 Gavin Esler
- 2024–present YolanDa Brown

=== Vice-Chancellors ===
- 1963–1980 Geoffrey Templeman
- 1980–1994 David J.E. Ingram
- 1994–2001 Robin Sibson
- 2001–2007 Sir David Melville
- 2007–2017 Dame Julia Goodfellow
- 2017–2024 Karen Cox
- 2024–present Georgina Randsley de Moura (Acting Vice-Chancellor)

=== Pro Chancellors ===
- 1960–1971 Wykeham Cornwallis, 2nd Baron Cornwallis
- 1971–1977 Sir Paul Chambers
- 1977–1984 Robin Leigh-Pemberton
- 1984–1993 Reverend David Say
- 1993–1999 John Knatchbull, 7th Baron Brabourne
- 1999–2005 Sir Geoffrey Chipperfield

Title changed to:

=== Chair of the Council ===
- 2005–2011 Valerie Marshall
- 2011–2014 John Simmonds
- 2014–present Sir David Warren

=== Visitors ===
The Visitor of the university is the Archbishop of Canterbury ex officio. The following Archbishops have served:

- 1965–1974 Michael Ramsey (appointed Archbishop 1961)
- 1974–1980 Donald Coggan
- 1980–1991 Robert Runcie
- 1991–2002 George Carey
- 2002–2012 Rowan Williams
- 2013–2025 Justin Welby

== Notable staff ==
- Dominic Abrams – Professor of Social Psychology & Vice President of the British Academy
- Andy Alaszewski – Emeritus Professor of Health Studies
- Harry Bloom – South African former political activist, author (deceased)
- Upamanyu Chatterjee – author
- David Corfield – philosopher
- Elizabeth Cowie – professor of film studies at the University of Kent
- Frank Furedi – founder and chairman of the Revolutionary Communist Party (RCP), Professor of Sociology
- Robin Gill – Anglican priest and theologian
- Roy Goodman – freelance conductor, violinist and organist
- Matthew Goodwin – professor and researcher of British politics
- Abdulrazak Gurnah – writer
- Rosalyn Higgins – President of the International Court of Justice
- Rosemary Hunter – Legal scholar and researcher Professor of Law
- Michael J. L. Kirby – former Canadian Senator
- Elena Korosteleva – Professor and Director of the Institute for Global Sustainable Development University of Warwick
- Bill MacMillan – Vice-Chancellor of the University of East Anglia
- Molly Mahood – literary scholar
- David McLellan (political scientist)
- Murray Smith – philosopher and film theorist; Professor of Film at the University of Kent
- Hamish Swanston, the first Catholic to head a Department of Theology at a British university since the Reformation
- David Turner – computer scientist, designer of the Miranda programming language
- Sarah Turner – filmmaker, and Director of Research, School of Music and Fine Art
- Glenn White – astronomer
- John Zarnecki – space scientist and principal on the Huygens probe

== Notable alumni ==
All bachelor's degrees unless stated otherwise

=== Academia ===
- Anuwar Ali – (PhD) – economist, exponent of higher education, second Vice-Chancellor and President of Open University Malaysia
- Jo Fox – Director Institute of Historical Research University of London
- Adrian Franklin – Professor of Sociology at the University of Tasmania
- Colin Hughes – Emeritus Professor of Microbiology University of Cambridge, Fellow of Trinity College, Cambridge
- Belinda Jack – Fellow and Tutor in French at Christ Church, Oxford at the University of Oxford
- Homa Katouzian – (PhD) – Professor of Iranian Studies at the University of Oxford
- Robert Lethbridge – Former Master of Fitzwilliam College at the University of Cambridge
- Lisa Roberts – (PhD) – Vice Chancellor University of Exeter
- Ralph Townsend (MA) – former Headmaster of Winchester College
- Patrick Collinson – Notable Elizabethan historian; (PhD) – former Regius Professor of Modern History, University of Cambridge
- Rupert Wegerif – Professor of Education at the University of Cambridge Fellow of Hughes Hall
- Lorraine Whitmarsh – environmental psychologist, Professor at the University of Bath

=== Theatre film and entertainment ===
- Farah Zeynep Abdullah – Turkish actress and singer including film The Butterfly's Dream
- Heather Agyepong – Actor/performer, photographer, visual artist.
- Andrew Burt – actor – the original Jack Sugden in Emmerdale
- Daragh Carville – playwright and screenwriter including The Bay
- Jackie Clune – actor, singer, and comedian
- Alan Davies – comedian, actor, and author: work includes television QI, Bob & Rose and Jonathan Creek and book Just Ignore Him
- Richard Denton – producer and director of television documentaries including Comrades and Kingswood – a Comprehensive
- Lyn Gardner – theatre critic, children's writer and journalist, founding member of City Limits magazine
- Mark Gillis – actor, including for the Royal Shakespeare Company, writer / director including for the indie film Sink
- Stuart Hazeldine – screenwriter and film director including The Shack
- Kim Ismay – actor including Royal Shakespeare Company and singer
- Martina Laird - actor, activist, playwright. Actor Casualty, Royal Shakespeare Company Playwright Driftwood.
- Bruce Langley – actor, known for playing the role of Technical Boy on American Gods
- Rebecca Lenkiewicz – playwright and screenwriter including Ida, Best Foreign Film at the Academy Awards 2015 and She Said (film)
- Laura Lexx – comedian and writer
- Matthew Morsia – fitness influencer, team member Gladiators
- Mark Simmons – stand-up comedian
- Megan Swann – magician, President of The Magic Circle
- Paul Telfer – actor, NCIS and Days of Our Lives
- Ramon Tikaram – actor, This Life and EastEnders
- Michelle Tsiakkas – professional dancer including Strictly Come Dancing series 22
- Neal Purvis and Robert Wade – screenwriters of the film Let Him Have It and eight James Bond films including Casino Royale, Skyfall and No Time to Die
- Ariel Vromen – Israeli screenwriter and film director including The Iceman
- Tom Wilkinson – actor, including The Full Monty and Academy Award nominee for In the Bedroom and Michael Clayton.

=== Literature ===
- Michael Baigent – (MA) – co-author of The Holy Blood and the Holy Grail
- Valerie Bloom – poet
- Debjani Chatterjee – poet
- Fred D'Aguiar – novelist, playwright, poet, and academic
- Abdulrazak Gurnah (MA) (PhD) – academic and novelist including Paradise and 2021 Nobel Prize in Literature winner
- Jane Harper – author The Dry
- Sir Kazuo Ishiguro – novelist, Man Booker Prize winner for The Remains of the Day and 2017 Nobel Prize in Literature winner, Screenwriter of Living (2022 film)
- E. L. James – author Fifty Shades of Grey and film producer Fifty Shades of Grey
- David Mitchell – novelist Ghostwritten, Cloud Atlas and Utopia Avenue
- Sarah Waters – novelist Fingersmith and Tipping the Velvet
- David Wingrove – science fiction writer
- Frederick Kambemba Yamusangie – novelist
- Musaemura Zimunya – Zimbabwean contemporary author
- John Lewis-Stempel – farmer and writer

=== Media ===
- Rosie Boycott – journalist, former editor of The Independent and Daily Express
- Janusz Bugajski – host of Bugajski Hour on several Balkan TV channels
- Ian Collins – radio presenter and TalkRADIO host
- Oliver Double – comedian and comedy historian
- Gavin Esler – former BBC Newsnight presenter and BBC North America Editor
- Shiulie Ghosh – former ITV news presenter
- Fi Glover – BBC Radio 4 presenter including The Listening Project
- Charlotte Green – BBC radio presenter
- David Horsey – (MA) – Pulitzer Prize-winning cartoonist
- Mark Mardell – Presenter The World This Weekend BBC Radio 4, former BBC North America and Europe Editor
- Matt Preston – Australian television presenter and food journalist
- Carolyn Quinn – BBC Radio 4 political presenter
- Paul Ross – journalist and presenter, former editor and presenter The Big Breakfast
- William Sitwell – former editor of Waitrose magazine now Telegraph columnist and Masterchef presenter
- Charlotte Smith – Presenter Countryfile and Farming Today
- Peter White – BBC Radio 4 presenter of You and Yours and BBC Disability Affairs Correspondent
- Patrick Wright – journalist, academic and author
- Sahar Zand – British-Iranian journalist, television presenter and documentary maker

=== Music ===
- YolanDa Brown – saxophonist, composer, broadcaster, philanthropist; double MOBO "Best Jazz" winner. Chair BPI music.
- Jon DaSilva – DJ and Record Producer – House and Dance music – pioneer at The Haçienda Manchester.
- Ana Free – Portuguese singer songwriter.
- Barbara Gaskin – singer – recorded No 1 hit single "It's My Party" with Dave Stewart
- Ellie Goulding – singer / songwriter (dropped out – did not graduate) albums include Lights
- Steve Hillage – guitarist (dropped out – did not graduate)
- Lami Phillips – Nigerian singer / songwriter and actress
- Tiwa Savage – Nigerian singer / songwriter

=== Business ===
- Afsaneh Mashayekhi Beschloss – CEO Rock Creek, Former Chief Investment Officer World Bank, Carnegie Corporation of New York Great Immigrants, Great Americans list 2020
- Ghanim Bin Saad Al Saad - Qatari Businessman and Chairman of GSSG Holding
- Zameer Choudrey, Baron Choudrey – Chief Executive Bestway Group
- Wayne Garvie – President International Production at Sony Pictures Television
- Tristia Harrison – Chief Executive Officer TalkTalk Group
- Max Hole – former Chairman and Chief of Global Operations Universal Music
- Carolyn McCall – Chief Executive Officer ITV
- Charles Wigoder – Executive Chairman Telecom Plus

=== Politics ===
- Abdullah Md Zin – (PhD) – minister in the Malaysian government
- Abbas Araghchi – (PhD) – Foreign Minister of Iran
- Azizan Abdul Razak – Menteri Besar (Chief Minister) of the Malaysian state of Kedah
- Gareth Bacon – Conservative Member of Parliament for Orpington – Shadow Secretary of State for Transport
- Steve Bassam, Baron Bassam of Brighton – (MA) – former Government Whip in the House of Lords
- Judith Blake, Baroness Blake of Leeds – former Labour Leader of Leeds City Council
- Wayne Caines – Minister of National Security Government of Bermuda
- Ronald D. Coleman – (Year abroad) – former United States Representative for Texas
- Baron Collins of Highbury – former Labour Party General Secretary - Deputy Leader of the House of Lords.
- Kaya Comer-Schwartz – Deputy Mayor of London for Policing and Crime – former Labour Leader of Islington Council in London
- Chris Davies – (MA) – former Liberal Democrat Member of the European Parliament for North West England
- Mark Drakeford – former First Minister of Wales
- Tamsin Dunwoody – former Labour Member of the National Assembly for Wales for Preseli Pembrokeshire; former minister in the Welsh Assembly Government
- Natalie Elphicke – former Conservative / Labour Member of Parliament for Dover
- Kishwer Falkner, Baroness Falkner of Margravine (MA) – Liberal Democrat peer
- Allison Gardner – Labour Member of Parliament for Stoke-on-Trent South.
- Sheila Gilmore – former Labour Member of Parliament for Edinburgh East
- Stephen Gethins -(MA) – SNP Member of Parliament for Arbroath and Broughty Ferry
- Kostis Hatzidakis – (MA) – Minister for the Environment and Energy in the Greek Government
- Dame Ann Hercus – (MA) – New Zealand politician and diplomat
- Jane Hutt – Minister for Social Justice – Senedd
- Kamarudin Jaffar – Member of Parliament of Malaysia for Bandar Tun Razak constituency and Deputy Minister of Foreign Affairs
- Jean-Charles Larsonneur – Deputy representing La Republique En Marche! for Finistère in the French National Assembly
- David Lepper – former Labour Member of Parliament for Brighton Pavilion
- Eunice M. Tembo Luambia Zambian ambassador to the UN in Geneva
- James MacCleary – Liberal Democrat Member of Parliament for Lewes
- Mastura Mohd Yazid – Member of Parliament for Kuala Kangsar district and Deputy Minister in the Malaysian Government
- Munira Mirza – (MA) (PhD) – former Director of the Number 10 Policy Unit
- Maria Mezentseva (MA) – Member of the Ukrainian Parliament
- Chris Mole – former Labour Member of Parliament for Ipswich
- Raychelle Omamo – Kenyan Cabinet Secretary for Foreign Affairs
- Abena Oppong-Asare – Labour Member of Parliament for Erith and Thamesmead – Parliamentary Private Secretary to the Prime Minister.
- Taiwo Owatemi – Labour Member of Parliament for Coventry North West – Lord Commissioner of the Treasury.
- Suren Raghavan (MA) (PhD) – Sri Lankan politician, former Governor of Northern Province, now National List MP for the Parliament of Sri Lanka
- Blake Stephenson – Conservative Member of Parliament for Mid Bedfordshire.
- Dan Tehan – (MA) – Australian politician, former Minister for Trade, Tourism and Investment in the Morrison government
- Emily Thornberry – Labour Member of Parliament for Islington South and Finsbury Chair of the Foreign Affairs Select Committee.
- Robin Tilbrook – leader and founder of the English Democrats
- Tom Vandenkendelaere – (MA) (PhD) – Belgian Member of the European Parliament
- Peter Whittle – former Deputy Leader of the UK Independence Party
- Alex Yam – Mayor of North West District and Member of the Singapore Parliament for Marsiling-Yew Tee GRC
- Fu Ying – (MA) – Chinese former Ambassador to the United Kingdom and Vice Minister for Foreign Affairs.

=== Law and administration ===
- Sir David Akers-Jones – (MA) former acting Governor of Hong Kong, 1986/87
- Ursula Brennan – Order of the Bath – former Permanent Secretary at the Ministry of Defence and Ministry of Justice
- Jonathan Cohen – High Court Judge, Family Division.
- Ivo Daalder – President of the Chicago Council on Global Affairs, former United States Permanent Representative to NATO
- Luke de Pulford – Human Rights Campaigner – recipient of the Benemerenti Medal
- Sir Chris Ham – former Chief Executive King's Fund.
- Irwan Hambali – (MSc) Police commissioner of the Royal Brunei Police Force
- Sarah Harrison (civil servant) – Chief Operating Officer for the Cabinet Office.
- Alastair John Naisbitt King – Chairman Naisbitt King Asset Management – Lord Mayor of London 2024 – 2025
- Mark Lucraft – former Chief Coroner, now Recorder of London, Lead Judge at the Old Bailey.
- Pippa Mills – formerly Chief Constable West Mercia Police now Assistant Commissioner Metropolitan Police
- Shan Morgan – Permanent Secretary to the Welsh Government
- Damilola Odufuwa – Founder of Nigerian Feminist Coalition and Microfinance specialist. One of Vogue's 12 Women leaders who changed the World in 2020.
- Sir Hugh Orde – former Chief Constable of the Police Service of Northern Ireland
- Joanna Roper – British Ambassador to the Kingdom of the Netherlands
- Lucy Scott-Moncrieff – Human Rights and Mental Health lawyer – Past President Law Society of England and Wales
- Dame Glenys Stacey – Chair Office for Environmental Protection – formerly Chief Executive Ofqual

=== Nobility ===
- Norton Knatchbull, 3rd Earl Mountbatten of Burma – a peer and second cousin of King Charles III, son of John Knatchbull, 7th Baron Brabourne
- Lady Amanda Patricia Victoria Knatchbull – daughter of John Knatchbull, 7th Baron Brabourne and cousin to Charles III
- Sir Jonathan Cohen – grandson of Lionel Cohen, Baron Cohen, great-great-grandson of financier Lionel Louis Cohen
- Joshua Leakey – recipient of the Victoria Cross, member of the Leakey family, relative of Lieutenant General Arundell David Leakey

=== Sports ===
- Paul Ackford – former England Rugby and British and Irish Lions rugby player, The Sunday Telegraph sports journalist
- Adam Ball – former England Under 19 Cricket Captain who played for Kent County Cricket Club
- Natasha Brennan – Women's Rugby Union player – Won the gold medal with the 2014 Women's World Cup England Rugby team.
- David Fulton – cricketer, former captain of Kent County Cricket Club
- Adebola Oluwo - Professional footballer. Central defender for Salford City FC EFL League division 2.
- Wayne Otto – British Karate Champion – Winner of multiple gold medals at Karate World Championships
- Jamie Reeves – (MA) – semi-professional footballer who won the FA Vase twice; pundit on the ESPN Star Sports coverage of the Premier League
- Susannah Townsend – Great Britain, England and Canterbury field hockey player, Gold medal winner 2016 Summer Olympics, Bronze medal winner 2020 Summer Olympics

=== Military ===
- Joshua Leakey – known for courageous actions in the Afghanistan campaign in 2015; recipient of the Victoria Cross (did not graduate – left in the first year to join the British Army)

=== Miscellaneous ===
- Madeline Argy – Podcaster, Influencer
- Chris Broad – YouTuber
- Tom Frame – (MA)- Australian Christian minister of religion, historian, author, and social commentator
- Akaliza Keza Gara – Rwandan IT activist
- Rachael House – artist
- Philip Howard – Michelin starred chef – The Square and then Elystan Street
- Leon McCarron – Northern Irish adventurer, author, filmmaker, broadcaster. Fellow of the Royal Geographical Society. Yale World Fellow 2024.
- Duro Olowu – Fashion Designer
- Martin Poll – Canon Chaplain of St George's Chapel Windsor Castle
- Stephen Shaw -(MA) – Prisons and Probation Ombudsman for England and Wales
- Johnny Yeo – artist and portraitist – his paintings are included in the permanent collection of the National Portrait Gallery, London

== Honorary doctorates ==
- Andrea Arnold, film director, doctorate of arts
- Giles Clark, conservationist (Big Cat Sanctuary), doctorate of science
- Iain Dale, radio broadcaster (LBC) and political commentator, doctor of the university
- Michael Morpurgo, author and playwright, doctorate of letters
- PinkPantheress, singer and producer, doctorate of music
