= Utopia Avenue =

2020 novel by David Mitchell

- First edition cover (UK)
- Author: David Mitchell
- Language: English
- Genre: Historical fiction
- Publisher: Sceptre
- Publication date: 14 July 2020
- Publication place: United Kingdom
- Media type: Print (hardcover), e-book, audiobook
- Pages: 576
- ISBN: 978-1-4447-9942-2 (hardcover)
- OCLC: 1121136308
- Dewey Decimal: 823.92
- LC Class: PR6063.I785 U86 2020b

Utopia Avenue is a 2020 novel by David Mitchell. It is his eighth published novel, and his first since Slade House (2015). It was published by Sceptre on 14 July 2020. The novel tells the story of the fictional 1960s British psychedelic rock band Utopia Avenue.

== Synopsis ==
The novel follows the fictional rock band Utopia Avenue, formed in Soho, London, in 1967. They were assembled by their Canadian manager Levon Frankland as a "psychedelic-folk-rock" supergroup. Each chapter name is the title of a song and focuses on one of the members of the band. It features cameos from David Bowie, Jerry Garcia, Leonard Cohen, Syd Barrett, Jackson Browne, John Lennon, Allen Ginsberg, Francis Bacon, Joni Mitchell, Steve Winwood, Keith Moon, Frank Zappa, Rick Wakeman, Cass Elliot, Sandy Denny and Marc Bolan, as well as Jimi Hendrix, Janis Joplin, Ron "Pigpen" McKernan, Jim Morrison, and Brian Jones — the latter five, coincidentally, all members of the 27 Club.

== Composition ==
Mitchell noted in an interview with the Los Angeles Review of Books that he wanted to escape the archetypal plot of the rock'n'roll novel, commenting that his band is more "harmonious than dysfunctional" and that "[m]ost of the characters' estrangements from 'normal life' and family occurred before the band's ascent, not during."

== Main characters ==
- Elf Holloway, keyboardist and lead singer. Previously in a folk group with her ex, Bruce.
- Jasper de Zoet, lead guitarist. The illegitimate child of a married Dutch father and an unmarried English mother.
- Dean Moss, bassist from Gravesend.
- Peter "Griff" Griffin, jazz drummer from Yorkshire.
- Levon Frankland, the band's manager, from Toronto via New York.

== Allusions/references to other works ==
Utopia Avenue contains references to characters from other works by Mitchell, following precedents set in his earlier novels. As Mitchell's oeuvre grows, the connections between his works become more numerous, ranging from the explicit that link the novel to what might be called his overarching über-book, to subtle recurrences of characters, places, and events. Some of the more apparent connections are:

- Jasper de Zoet listens to a recording of The Cloud Atlas Sextet composed by Robert Frobisher, a character and work described in Cloud Atlas.
- Jasper is a descendant of Jacob de Zoet, the protagonist from The Thousand Autumns of Jacob de Zoet.
- The band's first single "Darkroom" is played on the radio by Bat Segundo, a DJ who appears in Ghostwritten.
- Jasper mentions a disembodied entity called 'the Mongolian' in his list of people he's met who understand and accept him, presumably the spirit from the Mongolia section of Ghostwritten.
- Jasper's friend from school, Heinz Formaggio, goes on to become the physicist mentioned in Ghostwritten.
- The band play at the pub in Gravesend owned by the Sykes family who appear in The Bone Clocks.
- Levon Frankland appears in The Bone Clocks at a literary event in the year 2015.
- Elf Holloway has a relationship with Luisa Rey, who appears in Cloud Atlas.
- At a party in London the band meet Crispin Hershey, the author from The Bone Clocks, as a child.
- Jasper is delivered from a poltergeist, who turns out to be the malign spirit of the abbot Enomoto from The Thousand Autumns of Jacob de Zoet, by Horologists Esther Little (The Bone Clocks) and Marinus. The character of Marinus (in various reincarnations) and the group known as Horologists are present in several of Mitchell's novels.
- Dean has a one-night-stand with Izzy Penhaligon, likely related to Captain Penhaligon of The Thousand Autumns of Jacob de Zoet and Jonny Penhaligon of The Bone Clocks.

== Reception ==
Writing for The Guardian, author Sarah Perry praised Mitchell's "consciously easeful and frictionless" prose.

In its starred review, Kirkus Reviews praised Utopia Avenue for its detail and realism, calling it Mitchell's most "realistic" novel since Black Swan Green (2006).

Publishers Weekly gave the novel a rave review, calling it "Mitchell at his best".

Writing for The New Yorker, writer Jonathan Dee felt the novel's "authenticity" was diminished by Mitchell's musical descriptions and undermined by unrealistic dialogue from the cameo characters. Ben Yagoda draws attention to a number of cases where American characters implausibly use expressions found only in British English.

== Awards and nominations ==
- Longlist, 2021 Andrew Carnegie Medal for Excellence in Fiction
