= Slade House =

2015 novel by David Mitchell

- First edition
- Author: David Mitchell
- Illustrator: Neal Murren
- Cover artist: Jeff Nishinaka (paper sculpture)
- Language: English
- Genre: Horror, drama, mystery
- Published: 2015 (Sceptre)
- Publication place: United Kingdom
- Media type: Print (hardback & paperback)
- Pages: 233 (special edition, hardback)
- ISBN: 9781473616684

Slade House is the seventh novel by British novelist David Mitchell. Slade House originated as a Twitter story which was then developed into a full novel, and is a companion to The Bone Clocks. Set between the late seventies and the present, the novel explores the mysterious Slade House and a number of characters who are drawn to it.

== Plot summary ==
=== The Right Sort ===
In 1979, Nathan Bishop and his mother are invited to the house of the respected Lady Grayer. Nathan is quickly acquainted with her son Jonah, and the two spend the afternoon in the garden of Slade House whilst Norah Grayer entertains Nathan’s mother. Nathan begins hallucinating strange people and other visions and becomes worried that the Valium he took from his mother is having a bad effect. After being invited into the house, he experiences more hallucinations before finding himself at his father's lodge in Rhodesia. This dream is quickly broken by the Grayers, who reveal themselves to be twin siblings and carnivorous Anchorites, beings who steal the souls of certain people to maintain their youth. The Anchorites conduct a ceremony, and feast on Nathan’s soul.

=== Shining Armour ===
In 1988, a detective inspector, Gordon Edmonds, is investigating Slade Alley, and stumbles into the garden. There, he meets a widowed woman named Chloe Chetwynd. While they talk, Edmonds hears children playing but is confused to see there are none. Edmonds reveals he’s investigating the disappearance of the Bishops, who were assumed to have fled debts, but a window cleaner awakened from a coma revealed his interactions with them on the day of their disappearance. The inspector and Chloe strike up a relationship, and Chloe reveals that the voices Edmonds heard are ghosts she too hears. They become intimate, but it is short-lived. Edmonds is lured upstairs, and has a brief encounter with the remnants of Nathan. The twins reveal they are not members of the Anchorites, but act alone. Norah, to Jonah's disdain, believes they can no longer operate as they have. They begin their ceremony and absorb Edmonds' soul.

=== Oink Oink ===
In 1997, a group of students belonging to a paranormal club converge upon Slade House, intending to investigate the disappearances of the Bishops and Edmonds. One of the students, Sally Timms, is infatuated with a fellow member. The leader of the group is the nephew of Fred Pink, the window cleaner who saw the Bishops before they disappeared. The group stumble into a previously non-existent Slade House and discover it appears as a student house in the throes of a Halloween party. Sally mingles with the guests of the party before waking to find herself next to a frozen man implied to be Inspector Edmonds, who hands her a weapon, a hairpin with a fox head. Sally is led to the attic via the Grayers' mind games. The twins argue once again about their methods, and prepare their ceremony. Sally swears someone will stop them, and then her soul is consumed.

=== You Dark Horse You ===
In 2006, Sally Timms' sister Freya meets with Fred Pink in a pub near the supposed Slade House. Pink reveals he has been investigating the House and the Grayers for years. He tells her they were born in the late 1800s, and were known for their mystical abilities. They travelled the world learning all they could and eventually retired to Slade House in the 1930s. They used their power to isolate Slade House from time, placing it in a bubble where it existed long after its destruction during bombings in the 1940s. Freya, believing Pink to be mad, intends to leave, but finds herself in the attic of Slade House. Jonah reveals he was playing Pink all along. Norah is furious with him for revealing their history to Freya, but they begin their ceremony. Just as Freya's soul is taken from her body, Sally appears, stabbing Jonah in the neck with the fox pin. The twins are enraged, and Freya's soul is not consumed and allowed to pass on.

=== Astronauts ===
In 2015, Norah Grayer invites the former psychologist of Fred Pink, Doctor Iris Marinus-Fenby, to Slade House. After eighteen years without fresh energy, the house's reality is decaying and Jonah remains injured and trapped in the attic. Norah inhabits the body of a young conspiracy theorist, who lures Iris into the garden with the insistence Pink was not mad. Within the reality of Slade House, it is clearly fading away, and a weakened Norah and Jonah are unable to play their normal mind games. Iris is drawn to the attic, where Jonah and Norah prepare to consume her, but at the last minute she reveals herself to be an Horologist: these are immortals who are reincarnated as opposed to the Shaded Way method of consuming souls for immortality. Marinus criticises the antiquity of the Grayers' methods compared to new ones, and encourages Jonah to attack, allowing her to easily destroy him. She leaves Norah in the collapsing attic of Slade House's final moments to age and wither into nothing. At the last second, Norah, enraged and powered by the desire for revenge, transplants her soul into an unborn child.

== Allusions and references ==
As with all of David Mitchell's novels, Slade House contains references to his other works, including people, places and events.

- The primary antagonists of the story are soul carnivores, people who learned dark arts in order to subsist on the souls of people with psychic gifts in order to maintain their youth. Soul carnivores are first introduced in The Bone Clocks.
- A vision of Mrs Bishop presented to Inspector Edmonds mentions that she has dreamed of being carried away to Zedelgem by the composer Vyvyan Ayrs, a direct reference to Cloud Atlas.
- Sally's crush mentions that his mother transcribed the Crispin Hershey novel Desiccated Embryos. Hershey is a main character in The Bone Clocks.
- Sally's friend Fern tells her that her brother committed suicide driving an Aston Martin off a cliff, a plot point in the character Hugo's story in The Bone Clocks.
- Sally wears a jacket designed by Zizzi Hikaru. Zizzi Hikaru is mentioned in other contexts in number9dream and Cloud Atlas.
- Sally's sister Freya works for Spyglass Magazine, a publication that Luisa Rey works for in Cloud Atlas and Ed Brubeck works for in The Bone Clocks. The Magazine also has an appearance in Utopia Avenue.
- An Enomoto Sensei is mentioned by Norah, a relative of one of the antagonists in The Thousand Autumns of Jacob de Zoet.
- Doctor Iris Marinus-Fenby is the Horologist generally known as Marinus, a primary character in The Thousand Autumns of Jacob de Zoet and The Bone Clocks.

== Reception ==
The Washington Post described it as "devilishly fun", and The Guardian as The Bone Clocks' "naughty little sister in a fright wig".
