= Black Swan Green =

2006 semi-autobiographical novel written by David Mitchell

- UK First edition cover
- Author: David Mitchell
- Language: English
- Genre: Semi-autobiographical, Bildungsroman
- Publisher: Random House
- Publication date: April 2006
- Publication place: United Kingdom
- Media type: Print (Hardback)
- Pages: 294 pp (first edition, paperback)
- ISBN: 1-4000-6379-5 (first edition, paperback)
- OCLC: 61513194
- Dewey Decimal: 823/.92 22
- LC Class: PR6063.I785 B58 2006

Black Swan Green is a semi-autobiographical novel written by David Mitchell, published in April 2006 in the U.S. and May 2006 in the UK. The bildungsroman's thirteen chapters each represent one month—from January 1982 through January 1983—in the life of 13-year-old Worcestershire boy Jason Taylor. The novel is written from the perspective of Taylor and employs many teen colloquialisms and popular-culture references from early-1980s England.

Mitchell has the speech disorder of stammering, and noted in 2011, "I'd probably still be avoiding the subject today had I not outed myself by writing a semi-autobiographical novel, Black Swan Green, narrated by a stammering 13 year old."

== Plot summary ==
=== Chapter 1: January man ===
Jason Taylor is a 13-year-old with a stammer in the small village of Black Swan Green in Worcestershire. The first chapter starts with a rule Jason's father has: "Do not set foot in my office" and Jason breaking that rule to pick up the phone. It also introduces Jason's older sister Julia, friend Dean "Moron" Moran, popular boy Nick Yew, Gilbert "Yardy" Swinyard, Ross Wilcox and his cousin Gary Drake, golden boy student Neal Brose, tomboy Dawn Madden, Mervyn "Squelch" Hill, bully Grant Burch, local legend Tom Yew and "less shiny legend" Pluto Noak. Jason secretly publishes his poems in the Black Swan Green Parish magazine under the alias "Eliot Bolivar". Jason breaks his grandfather's expensive Omega Seamaster de Ville watch. Also, after an accident on an iced-over lake, he meets a mysterious old woman rumoured to be a witch.

=== Chapter 2: Hangman ===
Jason goes into more detail about his struggles with stammering. He then explains how his stammers affect his relationships with other people. He refers to this mental block as "hangman". He's scared to stand up and speak during the school's weekly rhetoric session, but is saved by a call from his South African speech therapist, Mrs. de Roo.

=== Chapter 3: Relatives ===
Introduces Jason's relatives who come for a visit, including cool, 15-year-old cousin Hugo Lamb (who reappears in Mitchell's later novel The Bone Clocks), who pressures Jason to try his first cigarette.

=== Chapter 4: Bridle path ===
Jason is attacked by dobermans and scolded by their owner. When he comes across he meets his classmates Kit Harris, Grant Burch, Philip Phelps and Ant Little. A fight between Burch and Wilcox ends with the former breaking his right wrist. Jason encounters Dawn Madden, a girl he has a crush on. She treats him like a dog. Escaping up a tree, Jason witnesses Tom Yew, on leave from the Navy, make love to Debby Crombie.

=== Chapter 5: Rocks ===
This chapter explores Jason's perspective on the growing British instability in the Falklands War and arguments between his mother and father. Tom Yew is killed when his ship, HMS Coventry, is bombed by Skyhawks. Eventually, a ceasefire is declared.

=== Chapter 6: Spooks ===
Jason's mother takes up an interest in running an art gallery part-time. Jason finds an invitation to join the Spooks, a local secret society made up of Noak, Burch, Swinyard, Peter Redmarley and John Tookey. Jason and Moran are challenged with making it through six back gardens in 15 minutes. Jason makes it with ten seconds to spare, but his friend Moran is injured when he falls through a greenhouse.

=== Chapter 7: Solarium ===
Jason receives an invitation from the publisher of his poems. The real benefactor is revealed to be Eva van Outryve de Crommelynck (a much younger version of whom also has a part in Cloud Atlas). She conducts sessions with him, offering constructive criticisms of his poems. Crommelynck is soon extradited as a result of her husband's financial scams in Germany.

=== Chapter 8: Souvenirs ===
Jason goes on two trips: one with his father for a work event, another with his mother to her job at Yasmin Morton-Bagot's gallery. During his trip with his father, Jason is taken to get fish and chips by Danny Lawlor, a man who works under his father at Greenland. He later meets his father's boss, Craig Salt. Jason's mother takes over as manager of Yasmin Morton-Bagot's gallery, La Boite aux Mille Surprises. Jason and his mother prevent a trio of girls stealing items from the store. His mother decides to take him to see Chariots of Fire, an act which gets noticed by people from his school.

=== Chapter 9: Maggot ===
Wilcox and Drake make fun of Jason for going to the cinema with his mother. Wilcox starts calling him "maggot", a name which grows within the school. The entire school is punished because Wilcox and his group berate a teacher. Jason meets Holly Deblin, who tells him, "You're not a maggot. Don't let dickheads decide what you are." Wilcox and his group jump Jason after school and Jason tries to stand up for himself, but fails. The bullies throw Jason's backpack atop the school bus' roof as it drives off. Jason catches up to the bus, the driver Norman Bates asks why Jason allows himself to be bullied. Bates urges that Jason attack Wilcox with a knife. Upon hearing this, Jason says that if he did he'd "get sent to Borstal." Norman Bates replies, "Life's a Borstal!"

=== Chapter 10: Knife grinder ===
A gypsy knife grinder visits Jason's house, offering his services. Jason does not let him in. Jason and his father attend a village meeting to decide what to do about a proposed gypsy encampment. After several speeches, a fire alarm is pulled, causing minor panic. Moran's father reveals to Jason that his grandfather was a gypsy. Through a series of events Jason finds himself in the gypsy camp.

=== Chapter 11: Goose fair ===
Jason finds Wilcox's lost wallet, containing six hundred pounds, at the fair. After some encounters in the fairground he decides to give it back. Wilcox breaks up with Madden and finds her sleeping with Burch. In shock, Wilcox steals Tom Yew's Suzuki and crashes it, losing part of his right leg.

=== Chapter 12: Disco ===
It is learned that Jason's father lost his job. Jason crushes Brose's calculator in a vice. After being taken to the Principal's office, Jason reveals that Brose has been running an extortion scheme intimidating other boys in his year for money. Brose is expelled. It is learned that Jason was kicked out of the Spooks. Miss Lippetts delivers a class about secrets and the ethics of revealing them. During the dance, Jason kisses Deblin. He reveals to his father that he broke the watch and his father reveals that he's been having an affair and is divorcing Jason's mother.

=== Chapter 13: January man ===
Taking place two weeks later, Jason reminisces around the village one final time before leaving. The mystery phone calls were from Jason's father's mistress, Cynthia. He has stopped writing poems for the parish magazine.

== Critical reception ==
In 2007 the book received recognition as a Best Book for Young Adults (Alex Awards) from the American Library Association. It was shortlisted for the 2006 Costa Book Awards, longlisted for the 2006 Booker Prize and was a Los Angeles Times Book Prize finalist. It was a School Library Journal Best Book of the Year, New York Times Notable Book of the Year, Time Magazine's Best Books of the Year, American Library Association Notable Books for Adults. It was shortlisted for the Bad Sex in Fiction Award.

== Allusions/references to other works ==
The book contains references and characters from other works by Mitchell, as is characteristic of his novels:

- Neal Brose, a pupil at the same school as Taylor, appears as an adult in Ghostwritten.
- Eva van Crommelynck, who tutors Taylor on poetry and life, also appears in Cloud Atlas, as do references to her father, Vyvyan Ayrs, her mother, and Robert Frobisher, composer of the rare and beautiful sextet that Jason listens to while visiting her. Eva encourages Jason to read Le Grand Meaulnes - also read by Eiji in number9dream.
- Gwendolyn Bendincks, the vicar's wife at the end of "Solarium," also appears in Cloud Atlas. She is one of two residents who head the Residents' Committee at Aurora House (the home to which Denholme Cavendish sends his brother Timothy).
- Mark Badbury, a pupil at the same school as Taylor, also appears as an adult in the short story "Preface" published in the [UK] The Daily Telegraph on 29.04.06.
- Another pupil, Clive Pike (as an adult) and school headmaster Mr. Nixon (both corporeally and disembodied) appear in the short story "Acknowledgments" published in Prospect, No. 115, Oct. 2005
- School headmaster Mr. Nixon (his first name is revealed as Graham) appears in the short story 'Denouement' published in The Guardian Review section, 26.05.07, in support of the author's appearance at the Hay Festival that day.
- Nicholas Briar, a pupil at the same school as Taylor, also appears as an adult in the short story "The Massive Rat" published in The Guardian "Weekend" supplement on 01.08.09.
- The Castles, next-door neighbors to the Taylors, also appear as the titular character's parents in the short story "Judith Castle", published in The Book of Other People on 01.02.08.
- The John Lennon song "#9 Dream", which is also the title of Mitchell's second novel, is played during the school dance.
- The character of Hugo Lamb is revisited in Mitchell's 2014 novel The Bone Clocks.
- The characters of Ross Wilcox and Dawn Madden are a married couple and Aunt and Uncle of the main character in the short story "If Wishes Was Horses" published in The New York Times on 13.07.20.

== Reviews ==
- Review of Black Swan Green: The Times (London)
- Review of Black Swan Green: The New Yorker
- Review of Black Swan Green: The New York Times
- Review of Black Swan Green: The Observer
- Review of Black Swan Green: www.thebookseller.com
