= Glen White =

Glen White can mean:

- Glen White (actor) (1880–?), American silent movie actor
- Glen White (cricketer) (born 1970), New Zealand cricketer
- Glen White, a guitarist in the Australian rock band Matt Finish in 1979 and 1980
- Glen White, West Virginia, United States, a census-designated place
- Glen White Run, a creek forming one of the gaps of the Allegheny, United States
- USS Glen White (SP-2068), a civilian collier used as a section patrol craft in 1918 and 1919 by the United States Navy (SS Glen White before and after)

== See also ==
- Glenn White, British astronomer
