= Doug Weston =

American nightclub owner (1926–1999)

Alexander Douglas Weston (December 13, 1926 – February 14, 1999) was an American nightclub owner, known as the owner of The Troubadour nightclub in Los Angeles which in the 1960s and 1970s was particularly responsible for promoting many successful singer-songwriters in the early stages of their careers.

== Career ==
Weston founded the club as a coffee house on La Cienega Boulevard in 1957. It moved to its current location at 9081 Santa Monica Boulevard, West Hollywood in 1961 and has remained open continuously ever since. The Troubadour played an important role in the careers of Elton John, Linda Ronstadt, the Eagles, the Byrds, Joni Mitchell, James Taylor, Carole King, Bonnie Raitt, JD Souther, Jackson Browne, Van Morrison, Buffalo Springfield, Guns N' Roses, and other prominent and successful performers whose early performances at the club helped establish their future fame. Los Angeles Times music critic Robert Hilburn said that Weston was "arguably the godfather of the Southern California singer-songwriter movement in the late '60s and early '70s".

A charismatic impresario, 6'6" tall with long hair, Weston became known for the agreements he made with new artists, which stipulated that, after they became famous, they would return to the club to perform. According to Hilburn:

At first, the pop world bowed to Weston's contract provisions because of the room's proven power. But industry figures finally rebelled against the demands and his increasingly eccentric behaviour, the latter due to heavy use of alcohol and drugs.

== Later life and death ==
In later years, Weston was no longer involved in running the club, but retained ownership. He died from pneumonia in a Los Angeles hospital on February 14, 1999, aged 72. A memorial was held at the Troubadour with performances and dedications from musicians as a tribute to him for his role in the success in so many entertainers' careers.

== In media ==
Weston and the Troubadour feature in the 2019 Elton John biopic Rocketman with Tate Donovan playing Weston. Weston and the Troubadour are also featured in the 2020 David Mitchell novel Utopia Avenue.
