= Sheep's Head =

Headland in County Cork, Ireland

Coordinates: 51°32′24″N 9°51′03″W

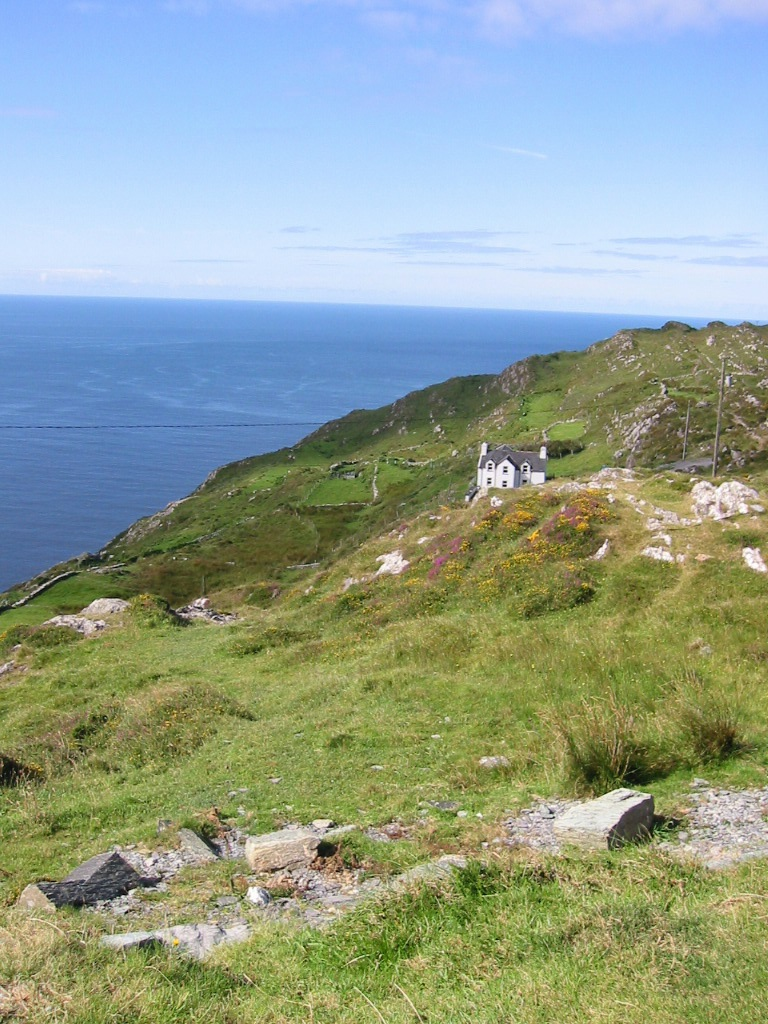
Sheep's Head, Bantry, County Cork, Ireland

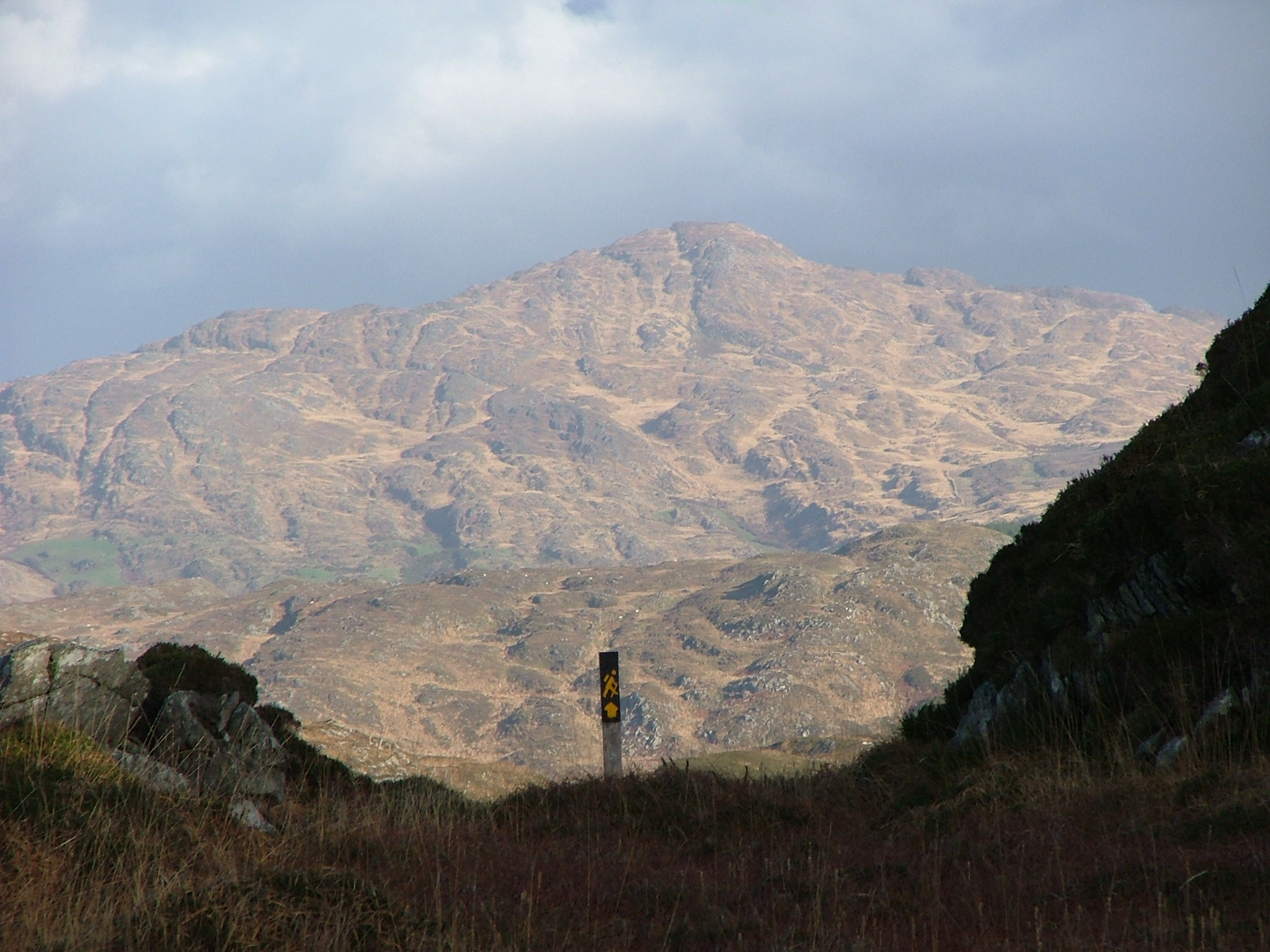
Sheep's Head Way, Bantry, County Cork, Ireland

Sheep's Head, also known as Muntervary (Irish: Rinn Mhuintir Bháire), is the headland at the end of the Sheep's Head peninsula situated between Bantry Bay and Dunmanus Bay in County Cork, Ireland.

The peninsula is popular with walkers, and the Sheep's Head Way is an 88 km long-distance trail which follows old tracks and roads around the peninsula from Bantry to the headland and back. The trail is very accessible and is well signposted. The route combines low and rugged hills with coastline and cliffs.

The walkway is straightforward and can be walked during any time between April and October. The trail is divided into eight stages—each representing a half-day's walking. Among those responsible for establishing the Sheep's Head Way were Tom Whitty, an American, local farmer James O’Mahony, and Jim Leonard.

The Sheep's Head Way network of trails includes 20 looped walks, and extends eastwards to include Kealkill, Drimoleague and Gougane Barra where it intersects with the Beara-Breifne Way. The Lighthouse Loop reaches all the way to the Sheep's Head Lighthouse situated at the far west end of the peninsula.

A Sheep's Head Way cycle trail also exists, and begins in Ballylickey, County Cork. It extends around the coastline of the Sheep's Head peninsula, and ends in Ballydehob.

The peninsula has three villages, Durrus (six miles from Bantry), Ahakista (twelve miles from Bantry), and Kilcrohane (sixteen miles from Bantry). Durrus has been identified as one of the key staging posts on the Wild Atlantic Way driving route along the Irish coastline and is the home to Durrus Cheese.

== Awards ==
The peninsula was named as a European Destination of Excellence for Sustainable Tourism in 2009. In March 2015, the Sheep's Head won Silver at the Irish Responsible Tourism Awards, and was longlisted for 'Best Destination' in the World Responsible Tourism Awards 2015.

The area's tourism cooperative won a special judge's commendation at the Irish Tourism Industry Awards in 2015.

== Archaeology ==
=== Durrus ===
- Boulder Burial, Ballycomane
- Burial Ground, Brahalish, Clashadoo, Coolcoulaghta, Dunbeacon, Kilvenogue,
- Cairn, Coolcoulaghta, Moulinward
- Castle, Dunbeacon
- Church, Moulinward (in repair 1639; ruins 1699)
- Fulacht Fiadha (cooking pit), Dunbeacon (Celtic Iron Age, 600 BC - 400 AD)
- Graveyard, Moulinward
- Holy Well, Dunbeacon
- Mill Stone, Brahalish
- Promontory fort, Coolcoulaghta (Celtic Iron Age, 600 BC - 400 AD)
- Ring forts, Ballycomane, Brahalish, Clonee, Drumtahaneen, Dunbeacon, Gortyalassa, Kealties, Rushineska (Celtic Iron Age, 600 BC - 400 AD)
- Shell Midden, Dunbeacon
- Standing Stones (Gallauns), Ballycomane, Coolcoulaghta (Stone Pair, Bronze Age, 2200 - 600 BC, Kealties, Parkana)
- Stone Row, Moulinward (Bronze Age 2200 - 600 BC
- Stone Circle, Dunbeacon (Bronze Age 2200 - 600 BC)
- Tower House (medieval post 1200 AD), Rossmore (O'Mahony/McCarthy?)

=== Kilcrohane ===
- Ardahill, Ardintenant, Caher, Caheragh, Derrycluvane, Drumnea, Faunmore, Gortalassa, Gortaneish, Killoveenogue, Knockroe, Raferigeen, Letter East, Rossnacaheragh, Tullig Ringfort (Celtic Iron Age, 600 BC - 400 AD)
- Aughaleigue, Gouladoo, Laherandota, Letter East, Holy Well
- Ballytransna, Kilcrohane, Cashel
- Ardaneig, Caher, Farranamanagh, Gortnakilla, Killonoveenogue, Letter West, Kilcrohane, Burial Ground
- Caherurlagh, Holed Stone for healing
- Dooneen, Galladoo, Keelovenogue, Promontory Fort (Celtic Iron Age, 600 BC - 400 AD)
- Dromnea, Bardic School Medieval post 1200 AD, Ornamental Tower erected Lord Bandon, Holy Well (tober na nduanairidhe well of the poets), possible fulach fiadh
- Farranmanagh, Stone Row Bronze Age, Children's Burial Ground, Souterrain, Tower house (O'Daly), Gallaun (standing stone
- Gouladoo, Holy Well
- Letter West, Children's Burial Ground
- Kilcrohane, Souterrain
- Signal Towers, Tooreen

== Natural history ==
- Owen's Island c. 1 hectare
- Sheep's Head, Coastal heathland includes rare plants Viola lactea (pale dog violet), Tuberaria guttata (spotted rock-rose) and also has choughs and fulmars.
- The Sheep's Head peninsula contains Special Areas of Conservation for peregrine falcons and choughs.

== In literature ==
- Sheep's Head features as a central location in David Mitchell's 2014 novel The Bone Clocks, being referenced throughout and providing the setting for the book's final section. A character in that section, Mo Muntervary (also a main character in Mitchell's debut novel Ghostwritten), takes her surname from the headland.
- Following his retirement from active writing, novelist of Irish descent J. G. Farrell moved to Sheep's Head, where he was later swept away to his death in a storm at the age of 44.

== Bibliography ==
- Amanda Clarke, Walking the Sheep's Head Way, 2014. ISBN 1500198552
- Donald Grant (lived in Dooneen), White Goats and Black Bees. (Editions: New York: Doubleday, 1974 ISBN 0-385-06522-1; London: Joseph, 1975 ISBN 0-7181-1294-6; Schull: Mizen Books, 1990 ISBN 0-911797-86-6)
- Barry Keane: The Beara, Sheep's Head, and Mizen Peninsulas: 40 walks and scrambles. Cork: Collins Press, 1997. 87 p. ISBN 1-898256-29-2
- Wolfgang Keller: Off the beaten track: the Sheep's Head Way as an example of rural tourism in the South West of Ireland. University of Goettingen (Germany), 2003. 128 p. (Dipoloma thesis)
- Ann McCarthy: Under the Shadow of Seefin. 2001
- Frank O'Mahony: Kilcrohane. (Book 1: Kilcrohane - the Holy Ground—Book 2: O'Mahony - the diary of Frank). Dromkeal: Frank O'Mahony, 1990. 148 p.
- Westropp, Thomas Johnson: Fortified headlands and castles in western County Cork. Vol. 1: From Cape Clear to Dunmanus Bay. Dublin, 1915. (Proceedings of the Royal Irish Academy / C. Vol. 32, no. 17)

== See also ==
- Extreme points of Ireland
- Durrus Cheese
