= From Me Flows What You Call Time (novella) =

Novella by David Mitchell

From Me Flows What You Call Time is a 90-page novella by David Mitchell completed in 2016 and not to be published until 2114. It is part of a series by artist Katie Paterson called Future Library calling for contributions from popular writers for novels to be published in 2114. The title is taken from a piece of music by the Japanese composer Tōru Takemitsu, the title of which is in turn taken from the poem "Clear Blue Water" by Makoto Ōoka.

As authors are revealed on a yearly basis, Mitchell was the second author whose participation in the project was made public following Margaret Atwood.

== Description ==
David Mitchell called the project "quite liberating, because I won't be around to take the consequences of this being good, or bad ..." He completed the work at 1:00 a.m. on the day he left for Norway (May 24, 2016) hours before getting on a plane to go to the induction ceremony where about 100 people had gathered on Saturday, May 28. At the ceremony, he handed over one hard copy and one paper copy to be sealed and housed in Oslo's new public library, which was to open in 2019.

Mitchell first received the proposal for the book in late 2014. Commenting on the substance of the book, Mitchell has said only, "it's somewhat more substantial a thing than I was expecting" and that the final one-third of the novel is not as "polished" as the first two-thirds.

Mitchell called the process "very pure" and also added that "by entering the pact of the project, you're predicating your decision on the belief that there still will be readers, there still will be books, there still will be trees". "It's a vote of confidence in the future," he called it. While writing the book, Mitchell mused to himself, "imagine this gets stolen and leaked on the internet in five years' time. Would I be ashamed of people reading it now?" Remarking on the process of writing the book, Mitchell said he did not have to worry about copyright: "I can quote a Beatles song if I want to."
