= Karen Cox =

Karen Cox may refer to:

- Karen Cox (nurse), British nurse and academic
- Karen L. Cox, American historian and professor
