= Ghostwritten (novel) =

1999 novel by David Mitchell

- Author: David Mitchell
- Language: English
- Genre: Drama
- Publisher: Hodder and Stoughton
- Publication date: 19 August 1999
- Publication place: United Kingdom
- Media type: Print (Hardback & Paperback)
- ISBN: 0-340-73974-6
- OCLC: 44533576
- Followed by: number9dream

Ghostwritten is the first novel published by English author David Mitchell. Published in 1999, it won the John Llewellyn Rhys Prize and was widely acclaimed. The story takes place mainly around East Asia, but also moves through Russia, Britain, the US and Ireland. It is written episodically; each chapter details a different story and central character, although they are all interlinked through seemingly coincidental events. Many of the themes from Ghostwritten continue in Mitchell's subsequent novels, number9dream and Cloud Atlas, and a character later appears in The Bone Clocks.

Ghostwritten is the product of a number of influences, particularly from East Asian culture and superstition, as well as real events remodelled for plot purposes (e.g. the sarin gas attack on the Tokyo subway). There are also hints and references to other works, most prominently from Isaac Asimov and the Three Laws of Robotics towards the end of the book, as well as Wild Swans by Jung Chang and The Music of Chance by Paul Auster.

== Plot ==
The novel is written in a series of changing first-person perspectives. The main characters, though strangers to one another, become connected through their actions and relationships.

This first chapter follows Quasar, a member of a millenarianist doomsday cult, attempting to evade capture in Okinawa after releasing nerve agents into a Tokyo subway train. His efforts to remain reclusive are hampered by the friendliness of the town's other inhabitants.

The next chapter focuses on Satoru, a young Filipino-Japanese record shop worker in downtown Tokyo with a deep love for jazz music. Satoru struggles to balance his complicated family life as an orphan, musical ambitions, societal pressure to begin a career, and his infatuation with Tomoyo, a new customer in the shop.

In the third chapter, Neal Brose, an expatriate lawyer in Hong Kong, is asked to manage a secret bank account. A chance meeting with Satoru and Tomoyo leads Brose to meditate on the end of his own marriage. Following this and a police investigation into the bank account, Brose suffers a breakdown. He dies in diabetic shock while climbing a hill towards the Tian Tan Buddha.

The fourth chapter centers on a Chinese woman and her tea shack on Mount Emei. Throughout her life, she and the shack encounter Chinese warlords, Japanese soldiers, Red Guards, reformists, and a tree she believes can speak to her. After finally visiting a Buddhist monastery at the mountain's peak, she dies peacefully at the tea shack.

Next, the novel follows a disembodied spirit. The "noncorpum" survives by transmigrating between the bodies of living human hosts. Though unaware of its true origins, the noncorpum follows a lead by transmigrating through rural Mongolia in search of answers. The noncorpum becomes untethered when a host is murdered, but is reborn as a Mongolian baby. It learns of its origins by transmigrating into the baby's grandmother. The noncorpum began its life as a young Buddhist monk executed during the Cultural Revolution. An interrupted attempt by another monk to save its life by transmigrating its soul to another body led to its life as a noncorpum. Faced with the meaning of its existence, the noncorpum decides to save the baby's life by transmigrating back into her body and becoming her mortal soul.

In the sixth chapter, Margarita Latunsky works as an attendant in the Hermitage Museum. Rudi, her abusive boyfriend, and Jerome, an art forger, conspire with her to steal a Delacroix painting from the museum. Following the successful heist, Jerome betrays the group, steals the painting, and murders Rudi. Latunsky then murders Jerome, but the painting is again stolen by Rudi's criminal associate, leaving Latunsky to the police. The chapter ends with Latunsky's concession that she is an unreliable narrator.

The next chapter follows Marco, a ghostwriter and drummer in a band called The Music of Chance. Through the course of a day in London, Marco interacts with characters referenced in previous chapters and considers the role chance plays in his non-committal lifestyle.

In the eighth chapter, Mo Muntervary has resigned her position as a physicist studying quantum cognition after realizing the research was being used to develop weapons for the United States government. Military agents pursue her as she flees through London, Hong Kong, Mongolia, and finally her home in Clear Island, Ireland, where the inhabitants decide to defend her.

The ninth chapter is related entirely through dialogue. It centers on Bat Segundo, the host of a late night call-in radio show, Night Train. Segundo receives regular calls from an entity calling itself Zookeeper. It becomes clear that Zookeeper is a benevolent artificial intelligence that was created by Mo Muntervary, which has broken loose. Zookeeper claims to have prevented disasters such as nuclear war in a bid to protect humanity. During one of the calls, Zookeeper is interrupted by a non-corpum named Arupadhatu, who offers Zookeeper a pact to dominate the world. Zookeeper refuses and destroys Arupadhatu live on-air. Segundo and Zookeeper continue their Night Train discussions through a series of global disasters.

The final chapter follows Quasar during his terror attack on the Tokyo subway. During the attack, Quasar encounters people and objects on the subway car referencing each other chapter. The novel concludes with Quasar on the subway platform questioning what has really happened.

== Connections to other Mitchell works ==
Characters mentioned in this book would appear in subsequent Mitchell novels, making Ghostwritten the initial entry in what would later become a heavily interconnected universe of stories.

- Neal Brose, the Hong Kong-based lawyer from that story, is a minor character in Black Swan Green.
- The book publisher Timothy Cavendish (from the London story) has a much larger role in Cloud Atlas. His brother Denholme (the head of the law firm in the Hong Kong section) is also featured.
- Luisa Rey, a journalist who phones into the Night Train show near the end of the book, is also a primary character in Cloud Atlas and a secondary character in Utopia Avenue.
- Suhbataar, the KGB agent from the Mongolia and St Petersburg stories, reappears as an arms dealer in Mitchell's next novel, number9dream.
- Dwight Silverwind, a spiritualist author mentioned several times in Ghostwritten, makes an appearance in The Bone Clocks.
- Radio DJ Bat Segundo plays the titular band's first single in Utopia Avenue.
- The noncorporeal entity who narrates the Mongolia section shares many similarities to the Horologists in The Bone Clocks, including the ability to hide out undetected in another's mind and to reincarnate into a newly born child if killed.
  - The same being makes an appearance in Utopia Avenue, known there as the Mongolian.
- Mo Muntervary of Clear Island reappears several decades later in the final section of The Bone Clocks, which is also set in rural southern Ireland.
  - It is implied throughout both novels she is a descendant of Con Twomey (the false name of Fiacre Muntervary), a character in The Thousand Autumns of Jacob de Zoet.
