= Swanston (surname) =

Swanston is an English-language surname derived from Swanston in Scotland, or similar toponym.

Notable people with this surname include:

- Charles Swanston (1789–1850), English merchant, banker, and politician, who lived in Tasmania and Geelong, Victoria
- Eliard Swanston (died 1651), English actor
- George Heriot Swanston (1814–?), Scottish map engraver
- Hamish Swanston (1933–2013), British theologian and historian
- James Beck Swanston (1878–1957), Canadian farmer, surgeon, and politician
- J. W. Swanston, 19th-century English printer
- Velma Swanston Howard (1868–1937), Swedish-American translator
