= Charlotte Proudman =

British barrister and women's rights campaigner (born 1988)

- Born: 1988 (age 37–38); Staffordshire, England
- Citizenship: United Kingdom
- Education: Keele University, University of Cambridge
- Occupations: Barrister, academic and writer
- Years active: 2011 to present
- Website: www.charlotteproudman.com

Charlotte Proudman (born 1988) is a British barrister, academic and writer who specialises in family law and women's rights.

== Early life and education ==
Proudman used her father's surname, Bailye, until 2011, when she took her maternal grandmother's maiden name of Proudman. Her father, an engineer and property investor, died when she was four years old, leaving his £330,000 estate to cancer charities. The family challenged the will, securing some money for Proudman to be held in trust until she turned 18. She grew up in Staffordshire and attended the local comprehensive school. After graduating in law and sociology at Keele University, Proudman studied for the Bar at City Law School in London. She was called to the Bar by Lincoln's Inn in July 2010 but before starting a pupillage she spent a year at Queens' College, Cambridge studying for an MPhil in criminology.

== Legal career ==
Having originally wanted to practise criminal law, Proudman undertook a pupillage in family law and continued to specialise in the area after gaining a place at Mansfield Chambers. She took a sabbatical to complete a PhD in female genital mutilation and the law at King's College, Cambridge, where her partner was studying for a PhD in artificial intelligence. In September 2015, shortly before she went to the United States to take up a post of visiting researcher at Harvard University, Proudman received extensive attention in the mainstream media after she publicly called out solicitor Alexander Silk-Carter for having commented on her LinkedIn photograph in a sexist way.

Proudman joined Goldsmith Chambers in London in 2016. Practising in family law, she has represented victims of domestic abuse and coercive control and campaigned for more openness in the family court. She also, as of 2025, holds a position of senior research associate in sociology at Jesus College, Cambridge, specialising in "gendered issues such as FGM, rape, domestic abuse, coercive control, prostitution, pornography and abortion".

In 2022, she founded Right to Equality, a not-for-profit organisation campaigning for gender equality under the law and the rights of women and girls. The organisation's activity has included campaigning for greater transparency and fairness in the family court and addressing violence against women and girls. Proudman and Right to Equality were instrumental in the campaign to repeal the presumption of parental involvement in the family courts, culminating in the government's announcement in October 2023 that it will repeal the law. Writing in The Guardian after the announcement, Proudman said: "Until judges receive mandatory specialist training on the realities of domestic abuse, there will be no meaningful cultural shift within family courts. Misogyny remains deeply embedded within the judiciary, just as it is across society and within almost every profession."

Proudman represented Kate Kniveton, former Conservative Member of Parliament (MP), in family law proceedings against her former husband, Andrew Griffiths, who had also been a Conservative MP. She secured findings of rape, assault and domestic abuse and coercive and controlling behaviour against Griffiths and was successful in preventing him having contact with his child. In 2021, two journalists, with the support of Kniveton, won a ruling to make the case public and Kniveton and Proudman featured in a ITV documentary in July 2025.

Proudman acted for a mother in a case in which, for the first time in the family courts, a High Court judgment referred to gaslighting. Judge Cobb endorsed Proudman's use of the term, saying: "Dr Proudman's use of the term 'gaslighting' in the hearing to describe this conduct was in my judgment apposite; the father's conduct represented a form of insidious abuse designed to cause the mother to question her own mental well-being, indeed her sanity".

In 2022, Proudman appealed a decision of Judge Marin, who said he found it difficult to believe that an "intelligent lady" could not remember the date she was raped. Proudman argued that the reasoning reflected outdated and victim-blaming assumptions about rape victims.

In 2023 and 2024, Proudman acted for MP Apsana Begum, after she made allegations that her former husband had harassed her through the Labour Party.

In April 2022, Proudman published a Twitter post in which she criticised a judgment by Jonathan Cohen in a case which she had lost, saying that it had echoes of a "boys' club" attitude. The Bar Standards Board (BSB) accused Proudman of having used "seriously offensive, derogatory language which was designed to demean and/or insult the judge". The case sparked United Nations (UN) concern over its potential to deter people from challenging gender bias within the legal profession and, in May 2024, four special rapporteurs from the UN wrote to the UK government about the BSB case and also about the on-line abuse directed at Proudman. On the second day of a scheduled four-day hearing in December 2024, a disciplinary panel of the BSB decided that there was no case to answer. Speaking after the hearing, Proudman said: "The BSB has proven itself unfit for purpose. In my view, the BSB's case against me is a clear case of sex discrimination." In September 2025 her application for a costs award of £353,017 was denied. She issued a claim against the BSB in the employment tribunal.

Proudman made a complaint to the Judicial Conduct Investigations Office (JCIO) in June 2025 about Judge Daniel Sawyer. She complained that the judge had trolled her on his anonymous X account, saying, for example, that she wrote "unprofessional drivel" about gender-based violence and that she knew nothing about criminal law. He also referenced a Jay-Z lyric, which, Proudman said, his followers would have understood as suggesting she was a "bitch". The JCIO initially accepted the complaint but then changed its mind, saying that the judge's conduct did not breach judicial standards.

In 2025, Proudman took up the case of ten women who had accused an employment judge, Philip Lancaster, of bullying and misogynistic behaviour during their employment tribunals. She called for more transparency and accountability in the judicial system generally.

Proudman opened her own family law firm in November 2025, with offices in London and Cambridge. The firm, Proudmans, aims to offer trauma-informed representation to clients, particularly those affected by domestic abuse, and also to conduct strategic litigation in an attempt to bring about reform to the family justice system.

== Books ==
- Female Genital Mutilation: When culture and law clash, published by Oxford University Press (2022)
- He Said, She said: Truth, trauma and the struggle for justice in family court, published by Weidenfeld & Nicolson (2025)

== Awards ==
- 2020: Rising Star, Women in Law Awards
- 2021: Highly Commended, Family Law Junior Barrister, Family Law Awards
- 2021: Case of the Year (H-N and Others), Family Law Awards
- 2023: Advocate of the Year, Women and Diversity in Law
- 2024: Highly commended, Woman of the Year, Women and Diversity in Law
- 2025: Woman of the Year, Women and Diversity in Law
