= Report of the Committee on Company Law Amendment =

The Report of the Committee on Company Law Amendment (1945) Cm 6659, known best as the "Cohen Report" for short, was a company law reform committee appointed by the United Kingdom Coalition Government, during the Second World War. It was chaired by Lord Cohen.

== Background ==
The Committee was appointed in June 1943 by Hugh Dalton, who later became Chancellor of the Exchequer.

== Recommendations ==
- This report recommended that shareholders be given a greater degree of control over directors, and led to CA 1948 s 184, then CA 1985 s 303, now CA 2006 s 168
- This also recommended that payments to directors on retirement should be subject to company approval (para 92, then CA 1947, then s 192 CA 1948).
- p 47 said ‘the suggestion that managing directors are paid excessive sums is, as a rule, unfounded’ but recommended disclosure of aggregate compensation of directors as a group, including payment for outside services.
- p 50 expressed concern about directors buying and selling shares with inside knowledge of the company, but merely recommended publicity (cf s 16 Securities Exchange Act, s 17 Public Utility Holding Company Act)
- p 51 recommended loans to directors be prohibited, except where companies are in the loan making business
- p 50 rejects the suggestion that interested directors could vote on transactions in which they are interested, as being impracticable
- It recommended abolition of the ultra vires rule, so every company has the capacity of a normal individual (this was done by the Companies Act 1989, now in CA 2006 s 40)
- It proposed that the Board of Trade would be given power to litigate on behalf of shareholders across the country
- para 126, twenty one days for annual meetings and meetings with special resolutions pending, fourteen days for others.

== See also ==
- UK company law
