= Future Library =

Collection of works set to be published in 2114

Interior of Future Library located at Deichman Bjørvika Library.

Future Library (Norwegian: Framtidsbiblioteket) is a public artwork that aims to collect an original work by a popular writer every year from 2014 to 2114. The works will remain unread and unpublished until 2114. One thousand trees were specially planted for the project in the Nordmarka forest at its inception; the 100 manuscripts will be printed in limited-edition anthologies using paper made from the trees. The Guardian has referred to it as "the world's most secretive library".

== History ==
The project was conceived by Katie Paterson during the summer of 2014. It is managed by the Future Library Trust and supported by the City of Oslo, Norway. It was produced for the Slow Space public art program and commissioned by Bjørvika Utvikling, the partly publicly owned corporation developing Bjørvika, Oslo's former container port.

The completed manuscripts are held in a specially designed room at the Deichman Library (Oslo Public Library) in Bjørvika, Oslo; Katie Paterson worked with the architectural team to design this part of the library. The 'Silent Room' where the manuscripts are kept is built using 100 layers of undulating, carved wood from the original trees felled to make way for the new trees planted in 2014, each layer with a glass drawer for the manuscript of the corresponding year; the room was first opened to the public in 2022. Although the collected works are on display, the manuscripts are not available for reading until the project completes in 2114.

One thousand certificates entitling the holder to the full 100-work anthology when published in 2114 are being sold by the artist's galleries: Ingleby Gallery (Edinburgh), James Cohan Gallery (New York) and Parafin (London). Initially sold for £625, the price increased to £800 in 2017 and subsequently higher. The certificates, double-sided and printed on hand-made paper (also made from the original trees felled for the project), depict a cross section of a tree with 100 tree-rings symbolising the time period for the project.

== Contributors ==
The identity of each contributing author is announced yearly each autumn; they then submit their manuscripts to the collection in early summer the following year at a public 'handover ceremony' in the forest where the trees are growing. Contributors to the collection so far:

- 2014 – Margaret Atwood, Scribbler Moon, submitted 27 May 2015.
- 2015 – David Mitchell, From Me Flows What You Call Time, submitted 28 May 2016
- 2016 – Sjón, As My Brow Brushes On The Tunics Of Angels or The Drop Tower, the Roller Coaster, the Whirling Cups and other Instruments of Worship from the Post-Industrial Age, submitted 2 June 2017
- 2017 – Elif Shafak, The Last Taboo, submitted 2 June 2018
- 2018 – Han Kang, Dear Son, My Beloved, submitted 25 May 2019
- 2019 – Karl Ove Knausgård, Blindeboken, submitted 12 June 2022
- 2020 – Ocean Vuong, King Philip, submitted 21 May 2023
- 2021 – Tsitsi Dangarembga, Narini and Her Donkey, submitted 12 June 2022
- 2022 – Judith Schalansky, Fluff and Splinters: A Chronicle, submitted 21 May 2023
- 2023 – Valeria Luiselli, The Force of Resonance, submitted 26 May 2024
- 2024 – Tommy Orange, As Always You Who Are Forever There, submitted 28 June 2026
- 2025 – Amitav Ghosh, Letter to My Grandson, submitted 28 June 2026
- 2026 – Laurie Anderson, announced 29 August 2026

The Future Library Trust's committee of trustees make a new selection annually based on the criteria "outstanding contributions to literature or poetry, and for their work's ability to capture the imagination of this and future generations". Umberto Eco and Tomas Tranströmer, both deceased as of 2016, were previously considered as potential contributors. All other authors approached by Paterson are believed to have accepted the invitation.

== Critical reception ==
Future Library has been generally met with interest and intrigue by the media, though it has attracted criticism from some for its emphasis on preventing readership between 2014 and 2114. Writing for Flavorwire, Moze Halperin called the project "art whose intention is to exclude a few generations" and criticized the class exclusivity planned for the works even after they are released.

== Notes ==
One of the few details known about the books was revealed accidentally when David Mitchell stated that his book quotes the lyrics of "Here Comes the Sun", a song expected to enter the public domain in the late 21st century.
