= Katie Paterson =

Scottish artist

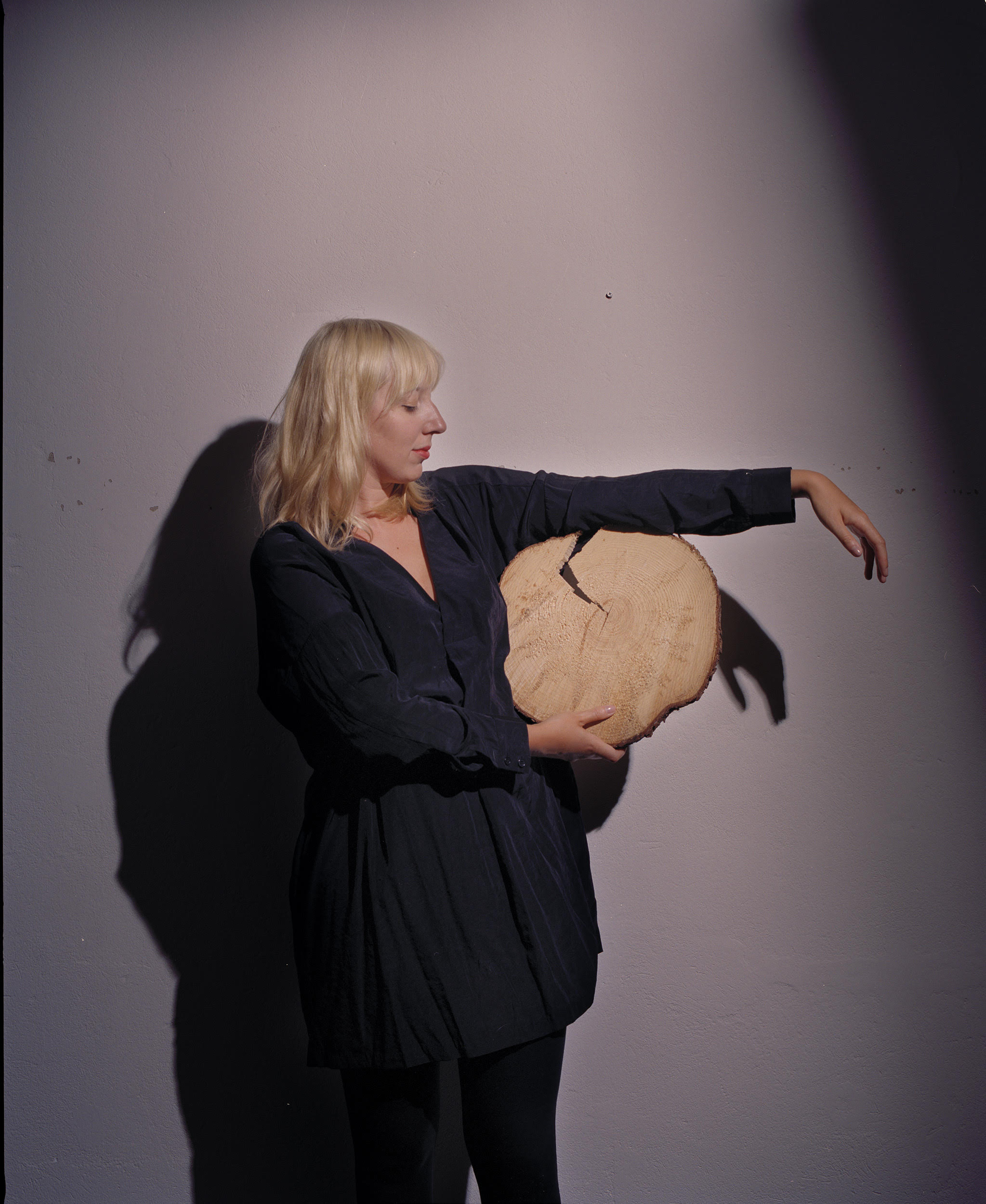
- Katie Paterson, Berlin 2014, photo by Oliver Mark
- Born: Glasgow, United Kingdom
- Website: katiepaterson.org

Katie Paterson is a Fife-based visual artist from Glasgow, Scotland, having previously lived and worked in Berlin whose artworks concern translation, distance, and scale. Paterson holds a BA from Edinburgh College of Art (2004) and an MFA from the Slade School of Fine Art (2007), she is an Honorary Fellow of the University of Edinburgh (2013).

== Work ==
Paterson has done several projects relating to melting glaciers; her graduation piece for art school, Vatnajökull (the sound of), featured a mobile phone number connected to a microphone submerged in a lagoon beneath Europe's largest glacier. Related work includes Langjökull, Snaefellsjökull, Soheimajökull, in which the soundscape of melting glaciers was created by making LPs from ice consisting of glacier meltwater.

In one project she created a map of 27,000 known dead stars. In History of Darkness, Paterson presents the viewer with a multitude of images in the form of 35 mm slides, all labeled with the disparate points in the universe in which they are photographed, that the viewer is invited to pick up and view in good light. Indicated on each is the distance in light-years from that point in the sky to Earth. To the eye, the images are all of virtually identical darkness.

She has had solo exhibitions at Modern Art Oxford, Kettle's Yard Cambridge, Mead Gallery, Warwick Arts Centre, Selfridges, London, BAWAG Contemporary, Vienna, Haunch of Venison, London, PKM, Seoul, Turner Contemporary, and Ingleby.

Paterson was the winner of a South Bank Sky Arts Award in 2014. and a Leverhulme Fellow at University College London. In July 2014, she sent an artwork to the International Space Station aboard ESA Georges Lemaître ATV (ATV-5).

In August 2014, to widespread acclaim, Paterson launched Future Library (NO:Framtidsbiblioteket), a 100-year-long artwork in Oslo's Nordmarka forest and new Deichman Public Library and announced Margaret Atwood as the first writer. Other writers include: David Mitchell, Sjón, Elif Shafak, and Han Kang.

She was included in the Towner Gallery (Eastbourne) A Certain Kind of Light exhibition showing from 21 January to 17 May 2017.

Turner Contemporary hosted a major retrospective of all Paterson's artwork in 2019, and launched a new book A place that exists only in moonlight, printed with cosmic dust.

== Awards ==
- First artist-in-residence in the Astrophysics Group within University College London (UCL) Physics & Astronomy
- South Bank Sky Arts Award 2014 for visual art
- Leverhulme Fellow, University College London
- Honorary Fellow of the University of Edinburgh (2013)
- Spirit of Scotland Award 2014
