= Sheep's Head Lighthouse =

Lighthouse in County Cork, Ireland

- Sheep's Head Lighthouse
- Location: County Cork, Ireland
- Coordinates: 51.54293°N 9.84847°W

Tower
- Constructed: 1968
- Construction: concrete
- Height: 7 m (23 ft)
- Shape: small cylindrical tower
- Markings: white
- Operator: Commissioners of Irish Lights

Light
- First lit: 1968
- Focal height: 83 m (272 ft)
- Lens: 150-watt lamp, 800mm dioptric lens
- Intensity: 59,000 candela (white), 15,000 candela (red)
- Range: 18 nmi (33 km; 21 mi) (white), 15 nmi (28 km; 17 mi) (red)
- Characteristic: Fl(3) WR 15s

Sheep's Head Lighthouse is an active 20th century lighthouse positioned on Sheep's Head, County Cork, Ireland.

== Construction ==
The lighthouse was commissioned by Irish Lights on the request of the Minister of Transport and Power and built in 1968 by J. Dennehy of Castletownbere and James Bradfield of Cork. The lens for the lighthouse, and other parts and materials, had to be transported by a helicopter, totaling in around 250 trips. Power was connected to the lighthouse by ESB over 19 electricity poles, at the same time as the Mizen Head signal station was electrified.

The design is similar to Achillbeg lighthouse. It is a 7 m (23 ft) high white round tower is situated on a square building, with the light 83 m (272 ft) above sea level. It emits three flashes every 15 seconds. There are backup lights and a backup diesel power source.

The Sheep's Head lighthouse was originally built to aid in the navigation of the tankers servicing the then-new Gulf Oil terminal on Whiddy Island, with the first tanker to avail of the aid being the 312,000 t (307,000 long tons; 344,000 short tons) Universe Ireland, then the largest ship in the world, arriving from Kuwait on October 29, 1968. To provide the expected service to large tankers, the light from Mizen Head and Sheep's Head lighthouses had to be sufficiently bright which in 1968 was confirmed to be 51,000 candles in the white section for the latter. According to some sources, the Gulf Oil corporation itself was engaged in arranging the construction of the lighthouse.

== Access ==
The lighthouse is automatic and not staffed. Visitors can view it from the walking route, the 3.4 km (2.1 mi) "Lighthouse Loop", and climb its stairs.

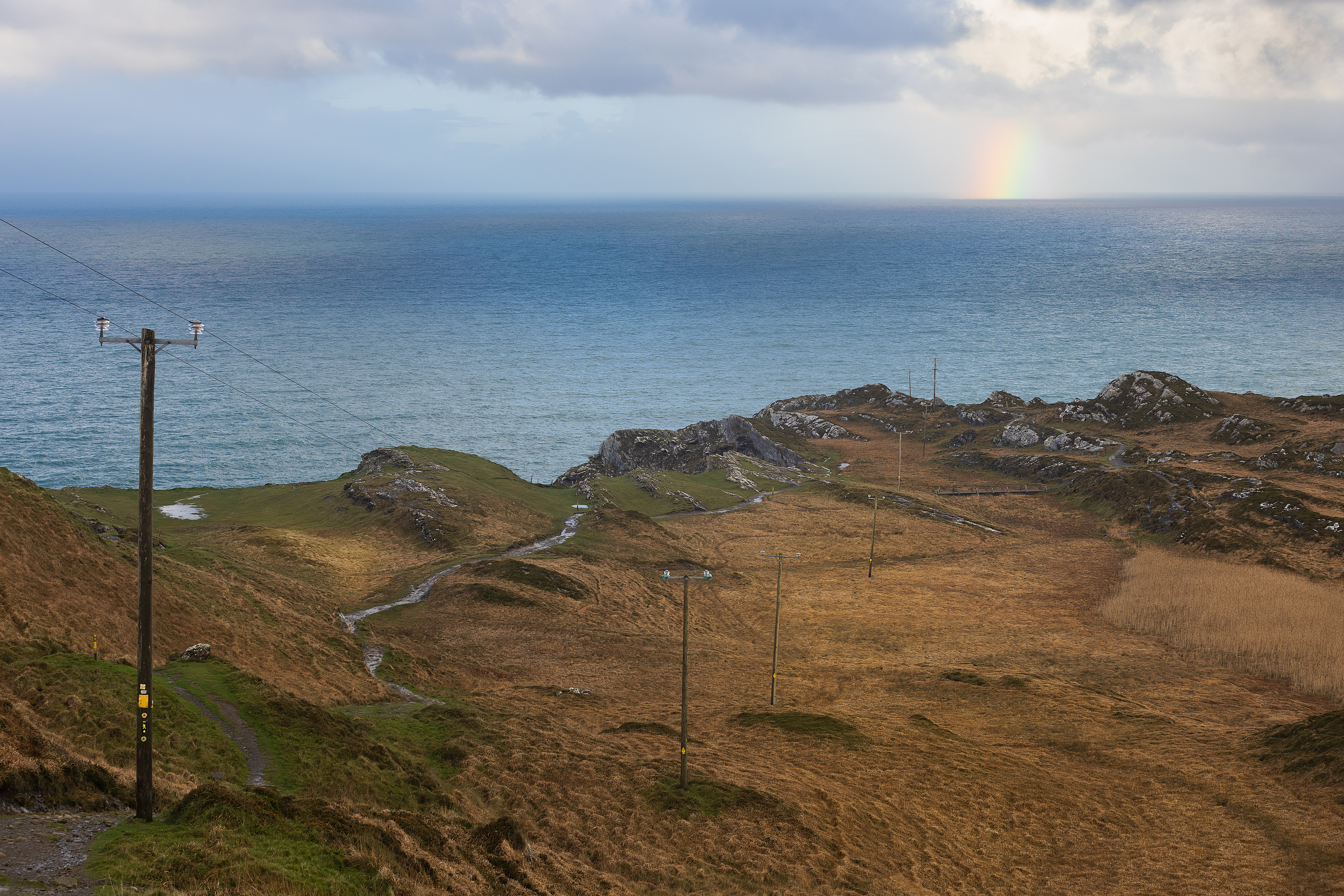
The lighthouse loop path along the ESB electricity poles leading to the lighthouse
