= Sarah Harrison (civil servant) =

Sarah Harrison CB MBE is a British civil servant, serving from July 2020 until December 2025 as the Chief Operating Officer for the Cabinet Office.

Harrison has worked in the regulatory and public relations industries, with a number of higher-profile appointments. These started as Chief Executive of ICSTIS (now the Phone-paid Services Authority) from 1994 to 1999, and then joining Ofgem, first as communications director, then managing director of corporate affairs, and finally as Senior Partner for sustainable development. She was then appointed Chief Executive of the Gambling Commission in October 2015, replacing Jenny Williams.

In February 2018, Harrison took over as the director-general for corporate services at the Department for Business, Energy and Industrial Strategy under Sir Alex Chisholm as permanent secretary. She transferred to the Cabinet Office in July 2020, shortly after Chisholm moved there as Cabinet Office Permanent Secretary, and she was eventually replaced at BEIS by Freya Guinness from April 2021.

Harrison was appointed a Member of the Order of the British Empire in the 2016 Birthday Honours for "services to Consumer Protection". She was additionally appointed a Companion of the Order of the Bath (CB) in the 2025 Birthday Honours, for services to Government Productivity and Regulatory Excellence.

Harrison has been appointed as the Chief Executive of the Building Societies Association, taking up the role from 1st December 2025.

Government offices
Preceded by Unknown	Director-General for Corporate Services; Department for Business, Energy and Industrial Strategy; 2018–2020	Succeeded by Freya Guinness
Preceded by Mike Parsons	Chief Operating Officer, Cabinet Office; 2020–	Incumbent
