= Lionel Cohen, Baron Cohen =

British barrister and judge

The Right Honourable The Lord Cohen PC
- Mr Justice Cohen in 1944 by Walter Stoneman

Lord of Appeal in Ordinary
- In office 1951–1960

Lord Justice of Appeal
- In office 1946–1951

Justice of the High Court
- In office 1943–1946
- Preceded by: Sir Christopher Farwell

Personal details
- Born: Lionel Leonard Cohen London
- Children: 3

Lionel Leonard Cohen, Baron Cohen, PC (1 March 1888 – 9 May 1973), was a British barrister and judge.

== Early life and career ==
Cohen was born in London, the only child of Sir Leonard Lionel Cohen, KCVO, a banker, and of Eliza Henrietta Cohen, née Schloss. His paternal grandfather was the financier and MP Lionel Louis Cohen. He was educated at Eton and New College, Oxford, where he took Firsts in History and Law. He was called to the bar in 1913 by the Inner Temple, but later joined Lincoln's Inn. During World War I, he served with the 1/13th London Regiment (1st Kensingtons Battalion), London Regiment, and was wounded in France.

After the war, Cohen returned to the bar, mainly practising company law. He was made a King's Counsel in 1929. During World War II, Cohen served with the Ministry of Economic Warfare from 1939 to 1943.

== Judicial career ==
Cohen was appointed to the High Court in 1943 and assigned to the Chancery Division, receiving the customary knighthood. In 1946, he was made a Lord Justice of Appeal and invested to the Privy Council. On 12 November 1951, he was appointed Lord of Appeal in Ordinary and made additionally a life peer with the title Baron Cohen, of Walmer in the County of Kent. In 1960, he retired as Lord of Appeal.

Cohen chaired many Royal Commissions in the years following World War II, particularly the Report of the Committee on Company Law Amendment in 1945 and on compensation. From 1946 to 1956 he chaired the Royal Commission on Awards to Inventors, which acknowledged scientists who had made technological advances such as radar and the jet engine during the war. He also headed the Cohen Inquiry into the loss of de Havilland Comet airliners G-ALYP ("Yoke Peter") and G-ALYY ("Yoke Yoke") in 1954.

== Personal life ==
In 1918 Cohen married Adelaide Spielmann (1895-1961), daughter of Sir Isidore Spielmann; they had two sons and one daughter. His son, Leonard Harold Lionel (known to all as Tim) Cohen OBE practised as a chancery barrister before joining his brother-in-law's merchant bank, M Samuel (later Hill Samuel), where he was a director. Tim's son, Sir Jonathan Cohen, was a High Court judge.

== Cases ==
- Canada (Attorney General) v Hallet & Carey Ltd [1952] AC 427 (JCPC)
- Candler v Crane, Christmas & Co [1951] 2 KB 164
- Boardman v Phipps [1966] UKHL 2

== Arms ==
Coat of arms of Lionel Cohen, Baron Cohen
Coronet Coronet of a baron Crest A Buck's Head couped Argent armed Or gorged with a Wreath of Oak proper and charged with four Barrulets Gules in the mouth a Rose of the last slipped also proper Escutcheon Argent on a Chevron Gules cottised Azure between two Roses of the second barbed and seeded proper in chief and a Buck's Head couped also proper in base three Annulets Or Supporters Dexter: a Pegasus Argent; Sinister: a Lion Or, each charged on the shoulder with Hurt thereon a Mill-Rind Gold

== See also ==
- UK company law
- Report of the Committee on Company Law Amendment (1945)
