= Glen White (cricketer) =

New Zealand cricketer (born 1970)

Personal information
- Born: 12 February 1970 (age 56)
- Source: Cricinfo, 17 March 2020

Glen White (born 12 February 1970) is a New Zealand cricketer. He played in four List A matches for Wellington in 1998/99. In February 2020, he was named in New Zealand's squad for the Over-50s Cricket World Cup in South Africa. However, the tournament was cancelled during the third round of matches due to the COVID-19 pandemic.
