= Eunice M. Tembo Luambia =

Zambian ambassador

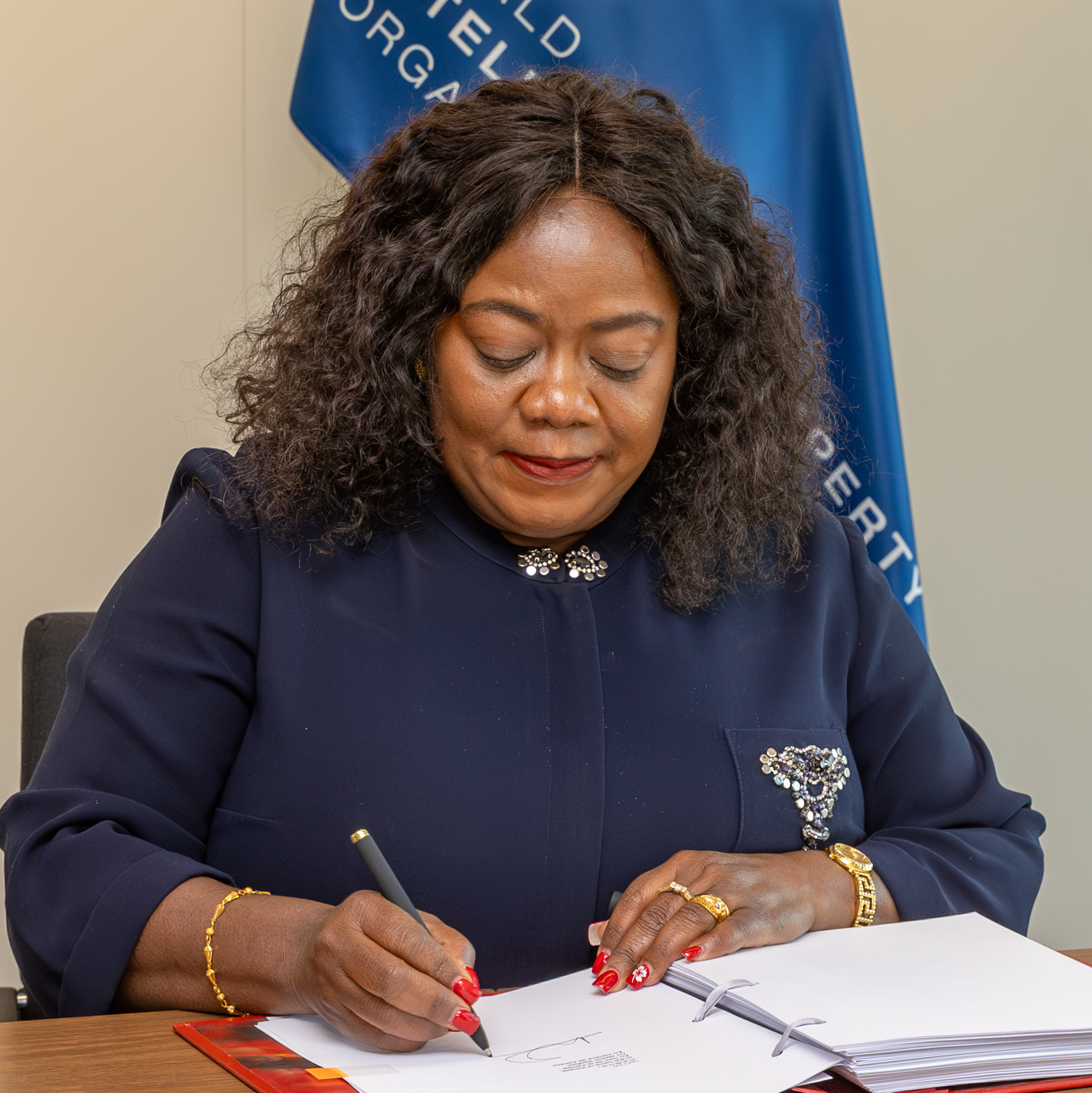
- Luambia in 2025
- Education: University of Zambia and the University of Kent
- Occupation: diplomat
- Known for: Zambia's permanent representative to the United Nations in Geneva

Eunice M. Tembo Luambia is a Zambian ambassador. In 2022 she became her country's permanent representative to the United Nations in Geneva and Vienna.

== Life ==
She graduated from the University of Zambia in 1986 before she studied for her master's degree in international relations in the UK at the University of Kent.

In 1993 she completed studies in Lusaka at the Zambia Institute for Diplomatic Studies that led to her post graduate diploma in diplomacy and international studies. She went on to hold positions at Zambia's embassies in South Africa and London.

In 2022 she became her country's permanent representative to the United Nations in Geneva and Vienna. She presented her credentials to UN Director- General Tatiana Valovaya in Geneva on the 5 July and to UN Director- General Ghada Waly in Vienna on 27 September.

In December 2023 there was no ban agreed on landmines at the Convention on the Prohibition of the Use, Stockpiling, Production and Transfer of Anti-Personnel Mines and on Their Destruction. At that meeting it was proposed that Zambia (i.e. Luambia) would chair the 23rd meeting of the parties in 2026.

In December 2024 she was at the World Trade Organisation's Trade Negotiations Committee's meeting where she chaired the negotiations on trade and environment for the first time. She reported that initially delegates were not showing evidence of wanting to bring about change.

On 28 February 2025 it was announced that she would be the focal point for the Small Island Developing States and Least Developed Countries for the UN's Human Rights Council.
