= Jonathan Cohen (judge) =

British judge

Sir Jonathan Cohen
- Born: 8 May 1951
- Education: Eton College
- Alma mater: University of Kent
- Relatives: Lord Cohen (grandfather)

Sir Jonathan Lionel Cohen (born 8 May 1951) is a retired British barrister and High Court judge (Family Division).

== Life ==
Cohen is the son of the barrister the Hon Leonard Harold Lionel Cohen, OBE (1922-2007) and grandson of High Court judge Lionel Cohen, Baron Cohen.

Educated at Eton and the University of Kent, Cohen was called to the bar by Lincoln's Inn in 1974 and took silk in 1997. He was appointed a Justice of the High Court and knighted in 2017. Cohen retired in May 2021.

== Arms ==
Coat of arms of Jonathan Cohen

Motto
All For The Best
