= Number9dream =

2001 novel by David Mitchell

number9dream
- First edition
- Author: David Mitchell
- Language: English
- Publisher: Sceptre
- Publication date: 2001
- Publication place: United Kingdom
- Media type: Print (Hardback & Paperback)
- Pages: 418 pp (paperback)
- ISBN: 0-340-73976-2 (paperback)
- OCLC: 45437339

number9dream is the second novel by English author David Mitchell. Set in Japan, the 2001 novel narrates 19-year-old Eiji Miyake's search for his father, whom he has never met. Told in the first person by Eiji, it is a coming of age and perception story that breaks convention by juxtaposing Eiji Miyake's actual journey toward identity and understanding with his imaginative journey. The novel employs eclectic narrations in each chapter.

== Summary of the plot ==
The novel is divided into 9 chapters.

=== One: Panopticon ===
Eiji waits inside a café in front of the Panopticon building in Tokyo. Akiko Kato, his father's lawyer, works in the building. Eiji plans to meet her and find out who his father is. The chapter alternates between descriptions of Eiji waiting in the café and his fantasies about his meeting with Akiko Kato: first he imagines trying to bluff his way into the building before storming it with weapons and stealing his file; then that a huge flood would submerge Tokyo and drown him; then that he subtly follows Akiko Kato into a movie theater, eavesdropping on her meeting with his father while a surrealistic film plays on the screen. Eiji drifts out of his waking dreams and, back at the café, he observes the customers and waitresses: he is attracted by a waitress with a beautiful neck and he shares his cigarettes with an old man resembling Lao Tsu who passes his time playing videogames. However, Eiji never finds the courage to confront Akiko Kato about the whereabouts of his father.

=== Two: Lost Property ===
This chapter consists of three interweaving narrations.

Eiji finds a job at the lost property office of a subway station. His boss, Mr. Aoyama, is worried that a restructuring could cost him a job; he becomes paranoid, accuses Eiji of conspiring against him, kidnaps a railway manager and finally kills himself.

In parallel, Eiji remembers his youth on the island of Yakushima, where he lived with his twin sister Anju after their mother abandoned them. One day Eiji is going to the mainland to play a soccer game. Before leaving he prays the thunder god to make him win, promising anything in exchange. Eiji's team wins the match thanks to him, but when he comes back to the island Anju has disappeared. Eiji discovers that she tried to swim to the whalestone, a rock in the middle of the sea, and drowned. He takes revenge on the thunder god by climbing to the top of the mountain to his statue's shrine, and sawing off the statue's head before throwing it into the sea.

While in Tokyo, Eiji receives two letters. The first is from Akiko Kato, attempting to deter Eiji from seeking his father. The second is from his mother, Mariko Miyake, revealing details of his and Anju's birth and infancy. Their mother had a rich married lover. When she got pregnant, he abandoned her. Mariko was an alcoholic and was unsuited to raising children, at one point deciding to throw Eiji off the balcony of her apartment. Before she could do so, he fell down the stairs. After Eiji's injury, she decided to bring the children to her native island and give them to her own mother to raise. When present-day Eiji calls the hospital from which the letter was written, he is told she left that morning.

=== Three: Video Games ===
While playing in a video game arcade, Eiji is befriended by Yuzu Daimon, a rich final-year law student. Daimon is waiting for a girl who doesn't show up, so he decides to take Eiji to a Christmas-themed bar in Shibuya. They pick up a couple of girls and Daimon takes them to an exclusive bar where he behaves very rudely to the waitress, named Miriam. Then Daimon takes Eiji and the girls to a love hotel where they drink and take drugs, but before pairing off to sleep together, Daimon insists that he and Eiji switch partners. Eiji finds himself alone with the girl who spent her night lavished by Daimon, and despite the odd, abrupt decision, they have sex. The next morning Eiji wakes up to find that he has been left there with the bill to pay, and Daimon is nowhere to be found. The management attempts to trap Eiji, but he escapes through the kitchen of an adjoining hotel and finds himself near the bar in front of Panopticon where he was at the beginning of the novel. He helps the waitress with the beautiful neck to get rid of a bad customer and he makes friends with her, learning her name, Ai Imajo.

Later he meets Miriam in a park. She mentions something about his father and leaves, dropping a library book. Eiji, with the help of a hacker friend called Suga, traces her and finds her address. He goes there and asks about his father, but he finds out that Miriam thought that he was Daimon's brother and so she was talking about Daimon's father.

=== Four: Reclaimed Land ===
Eiji is kidnapped by a yakuza gang. Daimon has been kidnapped as well. Eiji finds out from him that there is a yakuza war going on: The old boss, Konosuke Tsuru, has disappeared and his two subordinates, Jun Nagasaki and Ryutaro Morino, are struggling to replace him. Nagasaki seems to have the upper hand and Morino seems to be washed up. It is Morino who had Eiji and Daimon kidnapped, because they have been disrespectful to Miriam, with whom Morino is in love. Morino threatens Eiji but doesn't harm him, and he reveals to him that he knows who his father is, but he won't tell him. He also had his men take a litre of blood from Daimon's body as punishment and warning; then he sends them away. Eiji puts Daimon on a taxi to his apartment and goes back to find the documents about his father. He only finds a picture of his father with Akiko Kato and a message to meet with Morino immediately at a slot machine arcade. Morino forces him to take a blood oath of submission to him for the night in exchange for information about his father. He takes him through a murderous spree that ends in a confrontation with Nagasaki near an unfinished bridge to a new airport terminal that is being built on land reclaimed from the sea. Nagasaki's men outnumber Morino's, but he has a secret weapon, an explosive that has been planted on them. He blows them all up and orders Suhbataar, his Mongolian hitman, to kill Eiji. But Suhbataar is working for the old boss, Tsuru, who is still alive: he blows up Morino's men and lets Eiji go.

=== Five: Study of Tales ===
Eiji wakes up in an unknown house. He receives a visit from Buntaro, his landlord, and discovers that he is the son of Mrs. Sasaki, Eiji's boss at the subway station. Buntaro reveals that he rescued Eiji after the events on the bridge. The house belongs to Mrs. Sasaki's sister, a deaf writer of fantastic tales, who is momentarily in Germany.

The narration alternates between Eiji's stay at the house and a surrealistic tale written by Mrs. Sasaki's sister. The tale's main characters are three anthropomorphic animals: Goatwriter, a literate goat who collects and writes tales and like Mitchell has a stammer; Mrs. Comb, his servant and cook, a hen; and Pithecanthropus, his handyman, a primitive hominid. They live in a wasteland devastated by war and inhabit a coach that travels around of its own will. After various adventures, they reach a pool at the foot of a backward flowing waterfall, a metaphor for death. All three jump in the pool.

Buntaro is going on holiday with his pregnant wife and asks Eiji to mind his video rental shop while he is away. Eiji makes contact with Kozue Yamaya, the detective who investigated his father for Morino. He asks her to give him the information, but she disappears before answering. Later he is contacted by his grandfather Takara Tsukiyama who asks to meet him. He also gets back in contact with Ai Imajo.

=== Six: Kai Ten ===
The grandfather doesn't come to the meeting for health reasons. Instead he sends an old friend, Admiral Raizo, who explains to Eiji that his father is a discredited son. He gives Eiji a journal that Mr. Tsukiyama's brother Subaru kept at the end of World War II.

The chapter alternates between entries from the journal and the events at the video shop. Subaru Tsukiyama was a pilot of kaiten, a torpedo modified with a cockpit, used towards the end of the war for suicide missions against American ships. The journal describes the life of the pilots from training to the end of their mission. But at the fatal moment Subaru's kaiten doesn't explode, it sinks to the sea bottom and he has the time to write his last journal entries before dying.

Eiji passes the days tending the video shop. In the evening he phones Ai and they talk about the meaning of life. She is a pianist and dreams of going to a music school in Paris, but her parents won't let her go. One evening, Suga shows up completely drunk and tells Eiji about a tragic event of his past when he involuntarily caused the death of a child. When Eiji goes to the appointment with his grandfather, his stepmother and sister are there instead. Grandfather has died. They tell him that the man claiming to be Admiral Raizo was actually Mr. Tsukiyama himself. They ask him to leave their family in peace and he accepts: He doesn't want to meet his father anymore.

=== Seven: Cards ===
Eiji finds a job as a cook in a pizza kitchen; his boss is Ai's roommate.

One day he receives a package from Kozue Yamaya: she reveals that, when she was a young mother, she and her baby were kidnapped by yakuza as payment for her husband's debts and she was forced to prostitute herself. Her child, also named Eiji, was killed and his organs sold illegally. She managed to escape, became a private eye and dedicated her life to investigating the gang that killed her child. She is presumed dead but sent discs of information on the yakuza organ-harvesting ring to several people she trusts, including Eiji.

When Suga is discovered trying to break into the Pentagon's computers, the secret service offers him a job working for them in Saratoga, Texas. Before leaving for America he gives Eiji a virus that can spread any kind of information through email.

Eiji finds a call on his answering machine from someone claiming to be his father. When he goes to the appointment, he finds that he has been tricked by yakuza in order to collect on unpaid debts left by Morino. He and three other men are forced to play a deadly game of cards for the enjoyment of Tsuru. They are saved by Tsuru's death by a stroke and fatal burn from a grill.

On his last shift at work, Eiji gets an order from a lawyer working in Panopticon. He realizes that the lawyer is his father, but when he goes to meet him he discovers that he is a selfish and vulgar man and prefers not to reveal his identity. Eiji later uses Suga's virus to send Yamaya's information disc to thousands of e-mail accounts across Japan, including law enforcement.

=== Eight: The language of mountains is rain ===
Eiji travels to Miyazaki to meet his mother. He travels on board trucks. The drivers tell him their stories and he dreams. When he gets to the clinic where his mother is recovering, they talk and find some understanding.

Afterwards, Eiji travels back to Kagoshima. A typhoon breaks out and he is forced to shelter in a garden hut. The next morning he takes the ferry to Yakushima and goes to visit his grandmother's house, but she is not home. The radio is on and broadcasting news of a major earthquake in Tokyo. He tries to phone Ai, but cannot get a line. Then he decides to run back.

=== Nine ===
The last chapter is empty.

== Main characters ==
- Eiji Miyake – A twenty-year-old Japanese student from the rural island of Yakushima, Eiji journeys to Tokyo to seek out a father he has never met. Eiji narrates the novel from the first-person perspective, and his narration mixes video game and blockbuster film-inspired waking dreams with reality, so the reader is often not quite sure about what level of reality events Eiji describes are taking place.
- Ai Imajo – A waitress at the Jupiter café. Eiji sees her early in the novel and is immediately smitten with her beautiful neck. Since he is too shy to engage her in conversation or even ask for her name, he refers to her as "the waitress with the beautiful neck" for much of the narrative, until circumstances pull them together.
- Yuzu Daimon – A womanizing final-year law student, born into money and privilege. He meets Eiji at an arcade and leads him on a night of debauchery, which ends up tying their fates closer than either of them first realize.
- Buntaro Ogiso – Eiji's landlord, who also runs the video rental store on the building's first floor. At first, his relationship with Eiji is strictly business, and Eiji worries that, should he not be able to make rent, Buntaro will have no qualms about evicting him instantly. But as the plot progresses, Buntaro is revealed to be very affectionate for Eiji, secretly rescuing him after an encounter with the yakuza.

== Critical reaction ==
Several reviewers have noted that number9dream draws heavily on Haruki Murakami's fiction, especially The Wind-Up Bird Chronicle.

Stephen J. Burn sees number9dream, Tom McCarthy's Men in Space and Andrew Crumey's Pfitz as examples of a subgenre Burn calls "multiple drafts" novels, a term taken from Daniel Dennett's model of consciousness.

== See also ==
- Haruki Murakami
- Number 9 Dream – a song by John Lennon
- The Voorman Problem – a short film produced in 2013, based upon a section of this novel
- The Bone Clocks – Mitchell's 2014 novel, in which the character of Crispin Hershey is revealed to be the author of The Voorman Problem
- Ghostwritten – Mitchell's first novel, published in 1999, in which Mr. Suhbataar also plays a role.
