= Karen Cox (nurse) =

British Registered Nurse and academic

Karen Cox is a British academic and former registered nurse. She is a former Vice Chancellor of the University of Kent. She was a Professor of Cancer and Palliative Care, and Deputy Vice-Chancellor of the University of Nottingham. She was one of the main drivers behind 'Project Transform' there, which led to many changes at the University but was controversial and suffered from significant delays and disruptions, so that the following Vice-Chancellor and University Executive Board collectively apologised to staff and students.

She served as the sixth Vice-Chancellor of the University of Kent from August 2017 until May 2024. She has overseen projects including the opening of the Kent and Medway Medical School. During her tenure the University's rank fell several places in the UK University league tables, and the Gold rating in the UK Government’s Teaching Excellence Framework (TEF) awarded in 2017 was downgraded to Silver in the 2023 assessment. She has overseen the proposed phasing-out of nine courses (less than 3% of the total courses offered by the University) later finalised to include Art History, Anthropology, Health and Social Care, Music and Audio Technology, Philosophy and Religious Studies, and the University's Journalism course. This received criticism from academic communities, including students and alumni in the affected areas.

In April 2024 Cox announced she would be standing down from her position as Vice-Chancellor of the University of Kent.
