= Glenn White =

British astronomer

Glenn J. White is Emeritus Professor of Astronomy at the Open University, UK, and was Research Group Leader of the Astronomy Group at the Rutherford Appleton Laboratory. He carries out research on star formation, artificial generative research, radio astronomy and on exoplanets.

== Scientific career ==
After studying radio astronomy at Jodrell Bank Observatory, the University of Manchester and at the University of Kent (1969–1972), he worked for a short period in x-ray astronomy at the University of Leicester, before joining Queen Mary College, University of London in 1976. He was Professor of Physics and Astronomy at the University of London (1993–2000), Professor of Space Science at the University of Kent (2000–2005), and is Professor of Astronomy at the Open University, a post held jointly with the Rutherford Appleton Laboratory since 2005. He has also held visiting positions at the University of Tokyo (1987), the Stockholm University (1998) and the University of Cambridge (1999). He was involved in the early development of astronomical millimetre and submillimetre wavelength astronomy in the 1970s and 1980s.

He is working on problems in star formation and submillimeter wavelength spectroscopy studies of the gas that forms stars, and has also studied the interaction of radio signals with plants and biological material. He is developing space missions to detect the atmospheres of Earth-like extrasolar planets, such as the European Space Agency's Darwin Mission, and the Japanese Space Agency's AKARI mission, which was successfully launched in February 2006, and the Herschel Space Observatory.

== Awards ==
- The Royal Astronomical Society Group Achievement Award, 2014 (awarded for the design, construction and delivery of the Spectral and Photometric Imaging Receiver (SPIRE) bolometer-based instrument as part of the instrument suite for ESA’s Herschel Space Observatory.)
- The Sir Arthur Clarke Award, 2013 (awarded for Team working on the HERSCHEL-SPIRE space mission)
- Daiwa Adrian Prize, 2004 (Co-holder for work on the Japanese AKARI Space mission)
- The Kelvin Lectureship in Physics, of the British Association, 1991 (awarded for Popularisation of Science)

== Media ==
White is an occasional contributor to the media, including the television programme The Sky At Night, The Sunday Times and BBC One.

He is a member of the Editorial board of Advances in Astronomy.
