= Hamish Swanston =

Hamish Francis Gambon Swanston (1933 – 8 September 2013) was a British theologian and historian.

Swanston was born in Great Yarmouth at Swanston House. His family originated from Swanston near Edinburgh. He graduated from Durham University in 1954 with a Bachelor of Arts degree in English. He was ordained as a Roman Catholic priest in 1960. At the University of Kent at Canterbury in 1977, he became the first Catholic to head a Department of Theology at a British university since the Reformation. He lectured regularly on various topics, notably including seventeenth and eighteenth century European opera, on which he has spoken at the Kennedy Center and the Los Angeles Opera Center.

== Selected works ==
His publications include:

- Community Witness
- Ideas of Order
- A Language for Madness
- Studies in the Sacraments (two volumes)
- In Defence of Opera
- Handel
- Celebrating Eternity Now: A Study in the Theology of St Alphonsus de Liguori
