= The Thousand Autumns of Jacob de Zoet =

Book by David Mitchell

- First edition
- Author: David Mitchell
- Language: English
- Genre: Drama, Historical fiction
- Publisher: Sceptre
- Publication date: 13 May 2010
- Publication place: United Kingdom
- Media type: Print (Hardback)
- Pages: 480
- ISBN: 0-340-92156-0

The Thousand Autumns of Jacob de Zoet is an historical fiction novel by English author David Mitchell published by Sceptre in 2010. It is set during the Dutch trading concession with Japan in the late 18th century, during the period of Japanese history known as Sakoku.

== Plot ==
The novel begins in the summer of 1799 at the Dutch East India Company trading post Dejima in the harbor of Nagasaki. It tells the story of a Dutch trader's love for a Japanese midwife who is spirited away into a sinister mountain temple cult.

=== Part 1: The Bride For Whom We Dance ===
In 1799, Japanese midwife Orito Aibagawa helps deliver the baby of Magistrate Shiroyama.

Jacob de Zoet, working as a clerk on a Dutch merchant ship, arrives at the island of Dejima, midway through an ad hoc trial of Daniel Snitker, the acting chief of a factory on the island. Jacob hopes to make his fortune working under Chief Vorstenbosch and the Dutch East India Company to pay for the dowry of his betrothed, Anna. After Snitker is fired for smuggling, Deputy Melchior Van Cleef considers Jacob for the position.

Jacob meets Orito, who, along with being a midwife, is also a talented student and the only female at the medical academy led by Dr. Marinus. Jacob has sneaked a Psalter onto Dejima, and if discovered as a Christian, he will be deported at the least and executed at the worst due to Japan's anti-Christian laws. The interpreter, Ogawa Uzaemon, keeps Jacob's Psalter a secret, and the two form a friendship.

Jacob realizes that Vorstenbosch only outed Snitker to make an example: Vorstenbosch punishes Jacob for not signing a forged document by forcing him to remain on the island for longer than his allotted time.

On New Year's Day, Orito is taken to live at the Mount Shiranui Shrine, run by Abbot Enomoto.

=== Part 2: The Mountain Fastness ===
A monk from Enomoto's monastery escapes with a scroll detailing the atrocities at Mount Shiranui: the monks rape the women kept at the Shrine, and the cult sacrifices the babies to attain immortality. The women of the Shrine, however, believe that their children are still alive, living down in the city. The scroll eventually comes into the possession of Jacob.

Unlike the other women, Orito isn't intended to be a mother, but a midwife to help the other women through their pregnancies. Orito eventually discovers a way out and nearly escapes the compound, but her guilt for abandoning the women overpowers her, and she gives herself up to the Shrine.

Before the events of the novel, Ogawa Uzaemon intended to marry Orito, but their circumstances prevented it. He still loves her, however, and hires mercenaries through a friend to mount a rescue mission. When they arrive at the Shrine, however, Uzaemon is betrayed by his team to Enomoto, who kills him.

=== Part 3: The Master Of Go ===
Captain Penhaligon of the Royal Navy attempts of to take the trade route with Nagasaki (in response to the fall of the VOC on New Year's Day). They do this with the help of Daniel Snitker, who in the meantime has escaped Vorstenbosch's custody. As the Dutchmen on Dejima, now led by De Zoet, refuse to submit to Penhaligon, the conflict escalates: Penhaligon orders his ship to fire on Dejima to destroy the last existing Dutch colony, but stops at the last moment to spare De Zoet, whose bravery reminds him of his son who died in a similar manner.

Having earned Shiroyama's respect in the conflict, Jacob gives the magistrate the scroll listing the atrocities of the Shrine of Mount Shiranui. Later, Shiroyama heroically sacrifices himself to kill Enomoto, poisoning their drinks at their game of Go.

=== Part 4: The Rainy Season ===
Years, later, Jacob marries and has a son with a Japanese woman other than Orito. Orito lives happily, leading the academy the late Marinus founded.

=== Part 5: The Last Pages ===
Jacob returns to the Netherlands without his son, remarries, and has another son. On his deathbed, he thinks of Orito.

== Development ==
Mitchell spent four years working on the novel, researching and crafting a vision of Japan at the end of the 18th century. Small details, such as if people used shaving cream or not, could require much time so that a single sentence could take half a day to write. "It was tough," Mitchell said. "It almost finished me off before I finished it off."

The origins of the novel can be found in 1994 when Mitchell was backpacking in western Japan while on a teaching trip. He had been looking for a cheap lunch in Nagasaki and came upon the Dejima museum. "I never did get the lunch that day," Mitchell said, "but I filled a notebook with information about this place I'd never heard of and resolved one day to write about it."

Some of the events depicted in the novel are based on real history, such as HMS Phaeton's visit to the Dutch territory of Dejima and subsequent ritual suicide of Nagasaki Magistrate Matsudaira Yasuhide. The main character, Jacob de Zoet, bears some resemblance to the real-life Hendrik Doeff, who wrote a memoir about his time in Dejima.

Late in the book, "land of a thousand autumns" is described as one of the names used by the Japanese for Japan.

== Awards and nominations ==
The novel won the 2011 Commonwealth Writers' Prize regional prize (South Asia and Europe); was long listed for the 2010 Man Booker Prize for Fiction, was one of Time's "Best Books of the Year" (No. 4 Fiction), and a New York Times Notable Book of the Year. It was shortlisted for the 2011 Walter Scott Prize.

== See also ==
- List of works about the Dutch East India Company
