= Cloud Atlas (novel) =

2004 novel by David Mitchell

- Author: David Mitchell
- Cover artist: E. S. Allen
- Language: English
- Genre: Science fantasy, drama
- Published: 2004 (Sceptre)
- Publication place: United Kingdom
- Media type: Print (Hardback & Paperback)
- Pages: 544 (first edition, hardback)
- ISBN: 0-340-82277-5 (first edition, hardback)
- OCLC: 53821716
- Dewey Decimal: 823/.92 22
- LC Class: PR6063.I785 C58 2004b

Cloud Atlas, published in 2004, is the third novel by British author David Mitchell. The book combines metafiction, historical fiction, contemporary fiction and science fiction, with interconnected nested stories in different writing styles that take the reader from the remote South Pacific in the 19th century to the island of Hawaii in a distant post-apocalyptic future. Its title references a piece of music by Toshi Ichiyanagi.

It received awards from both the general literary community and the speculative fiction community, including the British Book Awards Literary Fiction award and the Richard & Judy Book of the Year award. It was also short-listed for the Booker Prize, Nebula Award for Best Novel, and Arthur C. Clarke Award. A film adaptation directed by the Wachowskis and Tom Tykwer, and featuring an ensemble cast, was released in 2012.

== Plot summary ==
The book consists of six nested stories; each is read or observed by the protagonist of the next, progressing in time through the central sixth story. The first five stories are each interrupted at a pivotal moment. After the sixth story, the others are resolved in reverse chronological order.

=== The Pacific Journal of Adam Ewing (Part 1) ===
In the mid-19th century Chatham Islands, American lawyer Adam Ewing keeps a journal while his ship is repaired. He witnesses a Māori overseer flog Autua, an enslaved Moriori man. Aboard the ship, Ewing's only friend, Dr. Henry Goose, diagnoses him with a fatal parasite. Meanwhile, Autua stows away in Ewing's cabin. After Ewing informs the Captain, Autua proves himself a skilled seaman and is allowed to work for passage to Hawaii.

=== Letters from Zedelghem (Part 1) ===
In 1931, in Zedelghem, near Bruges, disowned and penniless English musician Robert Frobisher writes to his lover, Rufus Sixsmith. He becomes amanuensis to aging composer Vyvyan Ayrs, expanding a basic melody Ayrs gives him into Der Todtenvogel (The Death-Bird), which earns critical praise. Encouraged, Frobisher begins composing his own music. He has an affair with Ayrs' wife, Jocasta, to the suspicion of her daughter Eva. He secretly sells Ayrs' rare books, discovers the first half of The Pacific Journal of Adam Ewing, and asks Sixsmith to find the rest. As summer ends, Jocasta thanks him for reviving Ayrs' creativity, and Frobisher agrees to stay until the following year.

=== Half-Lives: The First Luisa Rey Mystery (Part 1) ===
In 1975 Buenas Yerbas, California, journalist Luisa Rey meets elderly Rufus Sixsmith in a stalled elevator and tells him about her late father, a war correspondent. Sixsmith warns her that the Seaboard HYDRA nuclear plant is unsafe, then is later found dead in an apparent suicide. Suspecting foul play, Luisa believes the plant's executives are eliminating whistleblowers. From Sixsmith's hotel room, she retrieves Frobisher's letters. Plant employee Isaac Sachs gives her a copy of Sixsmith's report, but before she can go public, assassin Bill Smoke rams her car—containing the report—off a bridge.

=== The Ghastly Ordeal of Timothy Cavendish (Part 1) ===
In early 21st-century London, 65-year-old vanity publisher Timothy Cavendish sees a sales boom after his client kills a critic. Threatened by the client's brothers, he seeks refuge, but his brother Denholme tricks him into entering an abusive nursing home, which Cavendish initially mistakes for a hotel. A failed escape attempt leads to public punishment. He mentions reading Half-Lives: The First Luisa Rey Mystery. As he settles in and begins plotting an escape, he suffers a stroke.

=== An Orison of Sonmi-451 (Part 1) ===
In 22nd-century Nea So Copros, a Korean state rooted in corporate culture, an Archivist records Sonmi-451's testimony via an orison, a holographic recording device. Sonmi-451 is a clone who had been working as a waitress at Papa Song's, part of a society where vat-grown clones, "fabricants", serve as cheap labor. Their awareness is suppressed through a chemical-laced food called "Soap," and after a twelve-year contract, they are promised retirement in Honolulu.

Sonmi is rescued by Professor Mephi and student Hae-Joo Im, who help her gain self-awareness and attend university. She watches The Ghastly Ordeal of Timothy Cavendish, but the session is interrupted when a student announces Mephi's arrest. Authorities are ordered to interrogate Hae-Joo and kill Sonmi on sight.

=== Sloosha's Crossin' an' Evrythin' After ===
On post-apocalyptic Big Island, the peaceful Valley Folk worship a goddess called Sonmi, and her account is their sacred text. Zachry Bailey blames himself for his father's death and brother's enslavement by the cannibalistic Kona tribe. Members of a technologically advanced society called Prescients occasionally visit, and Zachry is wary of one named Meronym, who asks him to guide her up Mauna Kea. After she saves his poisoned sister, he agrees. At the ruins of the Mauna Kea Observatories, Meronym explains the orison Zachry found and reveals Sonmi's true story.

On their return, the Kona ambush the Valley Folk. Zachry and Meronym escape, and she takes him to a safer island. Years later, Zachry's son recalls this tale, suggesting it may be true—he now possesses Sonmi's orison.

=== An Orison of Sonmi-451 (Part 2) ===
Hae-Joo Im reveals that he and Mephi are part of Union, a rebel group opposing the corporate government. Disguised, Hae-Joo takes Sonmi to a ship where she witnesses how retired fabricants are slaughtered and turned into Soap, with leftovers used in the food served at such establishments as Papa Song's. Union aims to awaken all fabricants and thus depose the country's corpocracy. They ask Sonmi to write abolitionist Declarations, which she does. She is later arrested in an elaborately filmed government raid.

Sonmi tells the Archivist she believes the government orchestrated her journey to stoke fear of fabricants. Her final wish is to finish watching Cavendish's story.

=== The Ghastly Ordeal of Timothy Cavendish (Part 2) ===
Having mostly recovered from his mild stroke, Cavendish teams up with fellow nursing home residents—Ernie, Veronica, and the senile Mr. Meeks—to escape. They seize a resident's son's car and celebrate at a pub, where staff nearly recapture them. In a rare lucid moment, Mr. Meeks rallies the drinkers, sparking a brawl that secures their escape. Cavendish later reveals his secretary blackmailed the gangsters, ensuring he will return to his former life safely. Back home, he reads the second half of Luisa Rey's story and plans to publish it, whilst also writing a screenplay about his experience.

=== Half-Lives: The First Luisa Rey Mystery (Part 2) ===
Rey escapes her sinking car but loses the report, and Sachs dies in a plane explosion orchestrated by Smoke. After Seaboard acquires her newspaper, Rey is fired. Smoke booby-traps a copy of the report at a bank, but Joe Napier—head of plant security and an old friend of her father—rescues Rey. Rey finds another copy aboard Sixsmith's yacht, Starfish. Smoke and Napier kill each other in a shootout. Rey exposes the corrupt corporate leaders, and Sixsmith's niece later gives her the final eight letters from Frobisher to Sixsmith.

=== Letters from Zedelghem (Part 2) ===
Frobisher continues assisting Ayrs while composing his Cloud Atlas Sextet, written for overlapping soloists, to be played on six different instruments. He falls for Eva, believing she shares his feelings, despite his affair with her mother. Jocasta, suspicious, threatens him. Ayrs increasingly plagiarizes Frobisher's work and threatens to accuse him of raping Jocasta if he resists. Despondent, Frobisher flees and rents a hotel room to finish his sextet and dreams of reuniting with Eva, only to learn of her engagement to a Swiss man. Ill and disillusioned, he decides to take his own life. Before shooting himself in a bathtub, he completes his sextet and writes one final letter to Sixsmith with the sextet and The Pacific Journal of Adam Ewing enclosed.

=== The Pacific Journal of Adam Ewing (Part 2) ===
The ship makes port at Raiatea, where Ewing observes missionaries oppressing the indigenous peoples. On the ship, Ewing falls further ill and realizes that Dr. Goose is poisoning him to steal his possessions. Autua saves Ewing by making him swallow salt water, an emetic, to expel the poison administered to him by Goose. Acknowledging that he owes Autua his life, Ewing resolves to join the abolitionist movement.

== Background and writing ==
In an interview with The Paris Review, Mitchell said that the book's title was inspired by the music of the same name by Japanese composer Toshi Ichiyanagi: "I bought the CD just because of that track's beautiful title." Mitchell's previous novel, number9dream, was inspired by music by John Lennon. Both Ichiyanagi and Lennon were husbands of Yoko Ono, and Mitchell has said this fact "pleases me ... though I couldn't duplicate the pattern indefinitely." He has stated that the title and the book address reincarnation and the universality of human nature, with the title referring to both changing elements (a "cloud") and constants (the "atlas").

Mitchell said that Vyvyan Ayrs and Robert Frobisher were inspired by English composer Frederick Delius and his amanuensis Eric Fenby. He has also noted the influence of Russell Hoban's novel Riddley Walker on the Sloosha's Crossin' story.

== Reception ==
The BBC's Keily Oakes said that although the book's structure could be challenging, "David Mitchell has taken six wildly different stories ... and melded them into one fantastic and complex work." Kirkus Reviews called it "sheer storytelling brilliance." Laura Miller of The New York Times compared it to the "perfect crossword puzzle," in that it was challenging to read but still fun. The Observer's Hephzibah Anderson called it "exhilarating" and commented positively on the links between the stories. In a review for The Guardian, Booker Prize winner A. S. Byatt wrote that it gave "a complete narrative pleasure that is rare." The Washington Post's Jeff Turrentine called it "a highly satisfying, and unusually thoughtful, addition to the expanding 'puzzle book' genre." In its "Books Briefly Noted" section, The New Yorker called it "virtuosic." Marxist literary critic Fredric Jameson found its new, science fiction-inflected variation on the historical novel now "defined by its relation to future fully as much as to past." Richard Murphy said in the Review of Contemporary Fiction that Mitchell had taken core values from his previous novels and built upon them.

Criticism focused on the book's failure to meet its lofty goals. F&SF reviewer Robert K. J. Killheffer praised Mitchell's "talent and inventiveness and willingness to adopt any mode or voice that furthers his ends," but noted that "for all its pleasures, Cloud Atlas falls short of revolutionary." Theo Tait of The Daily Telegraph gave the novel a mixed review, focusing on its clashing themes, saying that while it "effectively [pastiches] everything from Victorian travelogue to corporate kill-speak to airport thriller" the book "spends half its time wanting to be The Simpsons and the other half the Bible."

In 2019, Cloud Atlas was ranked 9th on The Guardian's list of the 100 best books of the 21st century.

In 2020, Bill Gates recommended it as part of his Summer Reading List.

== Awards and nominations ==
The book won the Literary Fiction Award at the 2005 British Book Awards and the Richard & Judy Book of the Year Award. It was shortlisted for the Booker Prize. It was nominated for the Nebula Award for Best Novel in 2004, and the Arthur C. Clarke Award in 2005.

== Structure and style ==
The book has been described as incorporating elements of metafiction, historical fiction, contemporary fiction, (post)apocalyptic writing and science fiction into its narrative. The book's style was inspired by Italo Calvino's If on a winter's night a traveler, which contains several incomplete, interrupted narratives. Mitchell's innovation was to add a 'mirror' in the centre of his book so that each story could be brought to a conclusion.

Mitchell has said of the book:

Literally all of the main characters, except one, are reincarnations of the same soul in different bodies throughout the novel identified by a birthmark ... that's just a symbol really of the universality of human nature. The title itself Cloud Atlas, the cloud refers to the ever changing manifestations of the Atlas, which is the fixed human nature which is always thus and ever shall be. So the book's theme is predacity, the way individuals prey on individuals, groups on groups, nations on nations, tribes on tribes. So I just take this theme and in a sense reincarnate that theme in another context ...

== Textual variations ==
Academic Martin Paul Eve noticed significant differences in the American and British editions of the book while writing a paper on the book. He noted "an astonishing degree" of variance and that "one of the chapters was almost entirely rewritten". According to Mitchell, who authorized both editions, the differences emerged because the editor assigned to the book at its US publisher left their job, leaving the US version un-edited for a considerable period. Meanwhile, Mitchell and his editor and copy editor in the UK continued to make changes to the manuscript. However, those changes were not passed on to the US publisher, and similarly, when a new editor was assigned to the book at the US publisher and made his own changes, Mitchell did not ask for those to be applied to the British edition, which was very close to being sent to press. Mitchell said: "Due to my inexperience at that stage in my three-book 'career', it hadn't occurred to me that having two versions of the same novel appearing on either side of the Atlantic raises thorny questions over which is definitive, so I didn't go to the trouble of making sure that the American changes were applied to the British version (which was entering production by that point probably) and vice versa."

== Film adaptation ==
The novel was adapted to film by directors Tom Tykwer and the Wachowskis. With an ensemble cast to cover the multiple storylines, production began in September 2011 at Studio Babelsberg in Germany. The film was released in North America on 26 October 2012. In Mitchell's October 2012 Wall Street Journal article "Translating Cloud Atlas Into the Language of Film," he compared the adapters' work to translating a work into another language.
