= David Mitchell (author) =

English novelist and screenwriter (born 1969)

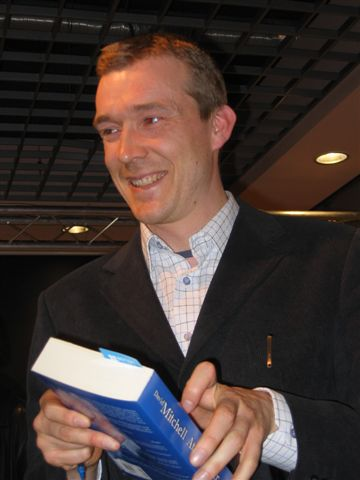
- Mitchell in 2006
- Born: David Stephen Mitchell; 12 January 1969 (age 57); Southport, England
- Education: University of Kent
- Occupations: Novelist, television writer, screenwriter
- Spouse: Keiko Yoshida
- Children: 2
- Writing career
- Period: 1999–present
- Notable works: number9dream Cloud Atlas
- Notable awards: John Llewellyn Rhys Prize; 1999 Ghostwritten
- Website: www.davidmitchellbooks.com

David Stephen Mitchell (born 12 January 1969) is an English novelist and screenwriter, who has also translated two children's books.

He has written nine novels, two of which, number9dream (2001) and Cloud Atlas (2004), were shortlisted for the Booker Prize. He has also written articles for several newspapers, most notably for The Guardian.

He was elected a Fellow of the Royal Society of Literature in 2013. With his wife Keiko Yoshida he translated a children's book about autism and its sequel into English from Japanese.

== Early life ==
Mitchell was born in Southport in Lancashire (now Merseyside), England, and raised in Malvern, Worcestershire. He was educated at Hanley Castle High School. At the University of Kent, he earned a degree in English and American Literature, followed by an M.A. in Comparative Literature.

Mitchell lived in Sicily for a year. He moved to Hiroshima, Japan, where he taught English to technical students for eight years, before returning to England. There he could live on his earnings as a writer and support his pregnant wife.

== Career ==
=== Prose ===
Mitchell's entire body of fictional works feature multiple recurring characters and themes that together form an interconnected fictional world, which Mitchell refers to as his 'macronovel'.

His first novel, Ghostwritten (1999), takes place in locations ranging from Okinawa to Mongolia to pre-millennial New York City, as nine narrators tell stories that interlock and intersect. It won the John Llewellyn Rhys Prize (for best work of British literature written by an author under 35) and was shortlisted for the Guardian First Book Award. His two subsequent novels, number9dream (2001) and Cloud Atlas (2004), were both favourably received and shortlisted for the Booker Prize.

In 2003, he was selected as one of Granta's Best of Young British Novelists, joining such writers as Adam Thirlwell, Andrew O'Hagan, Philip Hensher, A. L. Kennedy and Zadie Smith.

Mitchell's sixth novel, The Bone Clocks, was published in 2014. In an interview in The Spectator, Mitchell said that the novel has "dollops of the fantastic in it", and is about "stuff between life and death". The Bone Clocks was longlisted for the 2014 Man Booker Prize and won the World Fantasy Award.

Mitchell was the second author to contribute to Future Library. He delivered his book From Me Flows What You Call Time on 28 May 2016.

Utopia Avenue, Mitchell's ninth novel, was published by Hodder & Stoughton in 2020, during the first year of the COVID-19 pandemic. Utopia Avenue tells the "unexpurgated story" of a British band of the same name, who emerged from London's psychedelic scene in 1967 and was "fronted by folk singer Elf Holloway, guitar demigod Jasper de Zoet and blues bassist Dean Moss". Jonathan Dee, reviewing for The New Yorker, felt the novel's "authenticity" was diminished by Mitchell's musical descriptions and undermined by unrealistic dialogue from the cameo characters. Ben Yagoda wrote about a number of cases where American characters implausibly use expressions found only in British English.

=== Other work ===
In 2012, his metafictional novel Cloud Atlas (again, with multiple narrators), was adapted as a feature film of the same name.

Following the release of the 2012 film adaptation of Cloud Atlas, Mitchell began work as a screenwriter with Lana Wachowski (one of Cloud Atlas' three directors). In 2015, Mitchell contributed plotting and scripted scenes for the second season of the Netflix series Sense8 by the Wachowskis, writing the series finale together with Aleksandar Hemon. Mitchell had signed a contract to write season three of the series, but Netflix cancelled the show.

One segment of number9dream was adapted as a short film titled The Voorman Problem and starring Martin Freeman. It was nominated for a BAFTA in 2013.

In August 2019, it was announced that Mitchell would continue his collaboration with Lana Wachowski and Hemon to write the screenplay for The Matrix Resurrections.

In addition to his fiction, Mitchell has written opera libretti in recent years. Wake, with music by Klaas de Vries, was based on the 2000 Enschede fireworks disaster. It was performed by the Dutch Nationale Reisopera in 2010. He created the opera, Sunken Garden, with Dutch composer Michel van der Aa; it was premiered in 2013 by the English National Opera.

Several of Mitchell's book covers were created by design duo Kai and Sunny. Mitchell has also collaborated with the duo, by contributing two short stories to their art exhibits in 2011 and 2014.

== Personal life ==
After another stint in Japan, Mitchell and his wife, Keiko Yoshida, live in Ardfield, County Cork, Ireland, as of 2018. They have two children. In an essay for Random House, Mitchell wrote:

I knew I wanted to be a writer since I was a kid, but until I came to Japan to live in 1994 I was too easily distracted to do much about it. I would probably have become a writer wherever I lived, but would I have become the same writer if I'd spent the last six years in London, or Cape Town, or Moose Jaw, on an oil rig or in the circus? This is my answer to myself.

Mitchell has a stammer. He believes that the film The King's Speech (2010) is one of the most accurate portrayals of that experience for an individual. He said, "I'd probably still be avoiding the subject today had I not outed myself by writing a semi-autobiographical novel, Black Swan Green, narrated by a stammering 13-year-old." Mitchell is a patron of the British Stammering Association.

Mitchell's and Yoshida's son is severely autistic. Mitchell says that to be the parent of a child with autism, "you have to become a stronger, kinder, more compassionate, more patient, tougher, clear-sighted person", and it is accompanied by a gift, "real enlightenment about the human condition and the human heart". In 2013, they translated a book into English that was written by Naoki Higashida, a 13-year-old Japanese autistic boy, titled The Reason I Jump: One Boy's Voice from the Silence of Autism. Mitchell called the book "a revelatory godsend", providing both practical advice and leading him to think of their son having greater agency than he had previously thought, which helped their son. Initially, his wife translated parts of the book out loud for him at the kitchen table, and then they translated the book informally to give to their son's teachers and care-givers; however, Mitchell's agent and editor thought it might have a wider audience, leading to a formal translation.

In 2017, Mitchell and his wife translated a second book by Higashida, Fall Down 7 Times Get Up 8: A Young Man's Voice from the Silence of Autism.

== Works ==
Novels

- Ghostwritten (1999)
- number9dream (2001)
- Cloud Atlas (2004)
- Black Swan Green (2006)
- The Thousand Autumns of Jacob de Zoet (2010)
- The Bone Clocks (2014)
- Slade House (2015)
- Utopia Avenue (2020)

Novellas

- From Me Flows What You Call Time (2016; publishing delayed until 2114 as part of Library of the Future project)

Short stories

Title	Publication	Notes
"Mongolia"	New Writing 8 (1999)	Incorporated into Ghostwritten
"The January Man"	Granta 81 (Spring 2003)	Incorporated into Black Swan Green
"What You Do Not Know You Want"	McSweeney's Enchanted Chamber of Astonishing Stories, ed. Michael Chabon (2004)	-
"Acknowledgments"	Prospect (October 2005)	Read online
"Hangman"	New Writing 13 (2005)	Incorporated into Black Swan Green
"Preface"	The Daily Telegraph (29 April 2006)	-
"Dénouement"	The Guardian (25 May 2007)	Read online
"Judith Castle"	The Book of Other People, ed. Zadie Smith (2007)	-
"The Massive Rat"	The Guardian (31 July 2009)	Read online
"An Inside Job"	Fighting Words, ed. Roddy Doyle (2009)	-
"Character Development"	Freedom: Short Stories Celebrating the Universal Declaration of Human Rights (2009)	-
"Muggins Here"	The Guardian (13 August 2010)	Read online
"Earth Calling Taylor"	Financial Times (30 December 2010)	Read online
"The Siphoners"	I'm With the Bears: Short Stories from a Damaged Planet (2011)	-
"The Gardener"	Kai & Sunny exhibition The Flower Show (June 2011)	-
"In the Bike Sheds"	We Love This Book (Summer 2011)	-
"Lots of Bits of Star"	Kai & Sunny exhibition Caught by the Nest (September 2013)	-
"Variations on a Theme by Mister Donut"	Granta 127 (Spring 2014)	-
"The Right Sort"	Twitter (July 2014)	Incorporated into Slade House
"My Eye on You"	Kai & Sunny exhibition Whirlwind of Time (March 2016)	-
"All Souls Day"	Jealous Saboteurs, Francis Upritchard (2016)	Incorporated into Black Swan Green
"A Forgettable Story"	Silkroad, Cathay Fiction Anthology (July 2017)	-
"Repeats"	Freeman's 5 (October 2018)	-
"If Wishes Was Horses"	The New York Times Magazine (12 July 2020)	Read online
"By Misadventure"	The European Review of Books (May 2021)	-
"U-Turn If You Want To"	The Spectator (17 December 2022)	Read online

Opera librettos

- "Wake" opera in four acts (May 2010) by Klaas de Vries (composer), electronics by René Uijlenhoet for Nationale Reisopera
- "Sunken Garden"(12 April 2013), film opera for English National Opera at Barbican Theatre

Selected articles

- "Japan and my writing", Essay
- "Enter the Maze", The Guardian, 2004
- "Kill me or the cat gets it", The Guardian, 2005 (Book review of Kafka on the Shore)
- "Let me speak", British Stammering Association, 2006
- "On historical fiction", The Daily Telegraph, 2010
- "Adventures in Opera", The Guardian, 2010
- "Imaginary City", Geist, 2010
- "Lost for words", Prospect, 2011
- "Learning to live with my son's autism", The Guardian, 2013
- "David Mitchell on Earthsea – a rival to Tolkien and George RR Martin", The Guardian, 23 October 2015
- "Kate Bush and me: David Mitchell on being a lifelong fan of the pop poet". The Guardian, 7 December 2018

Other

- "The Earthgod and the Fox", 2012 (translation of a short story by Kenji Miyazawa; translation printed in McSweeney's Issue 42, 2012)
- The Reason I Jump: One Boy's Voice from the Silence of Autism, 2013 (translation of book by Naoki Higashida)
- "Before the Dawn", 2014 (with Kate Bush co-wrote two spoken scenes during The Ninth Wave sequence in this live production).
- Fall Down 7 Times Get Up 8, 2017 (translation of Naoki Higashida's work)
- "Amor Vincit Omnia", 2018; Sense8 episode
- The Matrix Resurrections, 2021 (feature film screenplay co-written with Lana Wachowski and Aleksandar Hemon)

== Sources ==
- "The world begins its turn with you, or how David Mitchell's novels think". In B. Schoene. The Cosmopolitan Novel. Edinburgh: Edinburgh University Press, 2009.
- Dillon, S. (ed.). David Mitchell: Critical Essays. Kent: Gylphi, 2011.
- Bentley, Nick (2018). "Trailing Postmodernism : David Mitchell's Cloud Atlas, Zadie Smith's NW, and the Metamodern". English Studies. 99 (7): 723–43. doi:10.1080/0013838X.2018.1510611. S2CID 165906081.
