= The Bone Clocks =

2014 novel by David Mitchell

- First UK edition
- Author: David Mitchell
- Cover artist: Neal Murren
- Language: English
- Genre: Drama
- Publisher: Sceptre
- Publication date: 2 September 2014
- Publication place: United Kingdom
- Media type: Print (Hardback)
- Pages: 609
- ISBN: 0-340-92160-9

The Bone Clocks is a 2014 novel by British writer David Mitchell. It was long-listed for the Man Booker Prize, and described as one of the best novels of the year by Stephen King. The novel won the 2015 World Fantasy Award.

The novel is divided into six sections with five first-person point-of-view narrators. They are loosely connected by the character of Holly Sykes, a young woman from Gravesend who is gifted with an "invisible eye" and semi-psychic abilities, and a war between two immortal factions, the Anchorites, who derive their immortality from murdering others, and the Horologists, who are naturally able to reincarnate.

The title refers to a derogatory term the immortal characters use for normal humans, who are doomed to mortality because of their aging bodies.

== Plot ==
The book consists of six stories set during different times of Holly’s life.

=== A Hot Spell, 1984 ===
Fifteen-year-old Holly Sykes runs away from home to live with her older boyfriend, but finds him cheating with her best friend. Undeterred, she sets off alone. Before leaving, her younger brother Jacko gives her a maze to memorize. On the road, she meets Esther Little, a strange older woman who gives her green tea in exchange for “asylum,” which Holly accepts, thinking her mad.

After experiencing a disturbing hallucination involving Jacko and old voices from her childhood, Holly meets Ed Brubeck, who feeds her and suggests work at a strawberry farm in Kent. On her way there, she hitchhikes with a communist couple, Heidi and Ian. The next morning, she finds them dead and is attacked by a man named Rhîmes who mistakes her for Esther. He is stopped by the reanimated corpses of the couple—revealed to be Esther in disguise—who embeds herself in Holly’s mind and erases her memory of the event.

Holly arrives at the farm and hears news of the couple’s deaths, but doesn’t connect it to herself. She befriends Gwyn, another former runaway, who advises her to go home unless her situation is dire. Soon after, Ed arrives to tell her Jacko is missing and that the police believe he’s with her, urging her to return home.

=== Myrrh Is Mine, Its Bitter Perfume, 1991 ===
Hugo Lamb, a cunning politics student at the fictitious Humber College, Cambridge, meets a mysterious woman named Immaculée Constantin who hints at immortality before he blacks out for two hours. At a pub, he reconnects with Elijah D'Arnoq and convinces the indebted aristocrat Jonny Penhaligon to join a high-stakes poker game. A violent altercation involving Hugo’s friend Richard Cheeseman ensues, during which Hugo steals his friend Olly’s girlfriend.

Living a double life under the alias Marcus Anyder, Hugo has illicitly accumulated nearly £50,000 through theft, fraud, and card cheating—including selling his recovering mentor’s stamp collection. He manipulates Jonny into selling his father's vintage Aston Martin to help pay gambling debts. After Jonny later drives the car off a cliff in an apparent suicide, Cheeseman calls Hugo with the news.

While in Switzerland for the holidays, Hugo meets Holly Sykes, a bar manager, and begins to fall for her. On New Year’s Eve, after a chaotic night involving accusations of theft, threats from pimps, and a police warning from his father, Hugo escapes to Holly’s place. They connect over her missing brother Jacko and eventually sleep together, though Hugo becomes jealous after seeing a postcard from her ex, Ed Brubeck.

The next day, just as Hugo considers seeing Holly again, he’s intercepted by D'Arnoq and Baptiste Pfenninger, who reveal themselves as Anchorites—immortal telepaths capable of stopping time and erasing memories. Given his moral flexibility and criminal past, they offer Hugo the chance to join them. With no future with Holly and legal trouble looming, Hugo accepts.

=== The Wedding Bash, 2004 ===
At 35, war correspondent Ed Brubeck returns to England for the wedding of Holly Sykes’s younger sister. Though he’s meant to be settling down in London with Holly and their six-year-old daughter Aoife, he secretly plans to return to Baghdad. During a walk on Brighton Pier, Ed and Aoife meet Immaculée Constantin, who checks Aoife for an invisible eye like Holly once had. Finding none, she vanishes.

During the wedding, Ed is haunted by memories of Iraq, especially the deaths of his guides Aziz and Nassar in a hotel bombing meant for foreign journalists. Wracked with guilt, he confides in Holly’s great-aunt Eilish, who shares a troubling belief: after a bout of meningitis, Jacko—Holly’s missing brother—was no longer himself, like a changeling.

After the wedding, Aoife goes missing. Ed searches Brighton Pier, suspecting she’s looking for the fortune-teller Dwight Silverwind. Though Silverwind hasn’t seen her, he joins the search. Back at the hotel, Holly has a trance-like episode, repeating “ten” and “fifteen.” Silverwind suggests she might be psychic. Ed uses the clue to find Aoife in room 1015. He lies to Holly’s family about how he found her but tells Holly the truth.

=== Crispin Hershey’s Lonely Planet, 2015 ===
Between 2015 and 2020, Crispin Hershey, once a literary prodigy, faces a steady decline. His latest novel flops following a scathing review by critic Richard Cheeseman; his marriage collapses; and at a book fair, he is overshadowed by Holly Sykes, whose memoir The Radio People becomes a bestseller. In Colombia, Crispin takes revenge on Cheeseman by planting cocaine in his suitcase. Cheeseman is sentenced to six years in prison—far beyond what Crispin intended.

As Crispin's career falters, he continues to cross paths with Holly, gradually becoming convinced her psychic claims are real. He witnesses her speak in tongues during a seizure on Rottnest Island and correctly call ten coin tosses in Shanghai. She repeatedly mentions cryptic images—“a spider, a spiral, a one-eyed man”—when near him. He also repeatedly ignores a young poet named Soleil Moore, who twice gives him her work.

Crispin and Holly grow close over the years. During a visit to Iceland, Crispin is attacked and interrogated by the now-immortal Hugo Lamb, who later erases his memory. He learns Holly has terminal cancer and is approached by a doctor, Iris Fenby, offering an experimental treatment. Around this time, Crispin fathers a child with Holly’s Spanish-language agent.

By 2020, broke and diminished, Crispin teaches at a fictional Ivy League college in New York. Cheeseman, newly freed and now wearing an eye patch, confronts him but ultimately spares his life. Moments later, Soleil Moore arrives. Furious that Crispin never read her work, she accuses him of failing to expose "the Script," a secret manipulation of humanity by powerful beings. She shoots him dead to draw attention to her message. As Crispin dies, he sees a spiral, a spider, and a toy pirate with an eye patch—fulfilling Holly’s eerie prophecy.

=== An Horologist’s Labyrinth, 2025 ===
In 2025, Marinus—currently inhabiting the body of Dr. Iris Fenby—receives psychic messages from Esther Little, long believed dead. Marinus, a member of a group of naturally reincarnating immortals called the Horologists, discovers that Esther has been hidden within Holly Sykes’ memories since 1984. Marinus reveals the truth to Holly: Horologists reincarnate without harm, while their enemies, the Anchorites, maintain immortality by murdering psychically gifted children to create “Black Wine,” a soul-draining elixir.

Marinus also discloses that Holly’s younger brother Jacko was actually Xi Lo, a Horologist who died in a failed mission in 1984. Holly, skeptical at first, agrees to join the Horologists after barely surviving an Anchorite attack. Marinus uses Esther’s ‘long name’ to extract her from Holly’s memory, and the Horologists resolve to attack the Chapel of the Blind Cathar, the metaphysical source of the Anchorites’ power. The Cathar, a heretical monk fused with his creation, enables the Anchorites’ predation.

Believing Xi Lo might still be alive, Holly joins the mission. In a brutal “psychosoteric” battle, many Horologists are killed, but Esther succeeds in destroying the Blind Cathar. Marinus' body is lost, but she survives inside Holly’s mind. Escaping through a mystical opening, Holly finds herself in the maze Jacko once asked her to memorize as a child. At its center, she and Marinus confront the deadly Immaculée Constantin. Marinus distracts her long enough for Holly to knock her out with a rolling pin.

At the maze’s heart is a golden apple. Marinus exits Holly’s mind and instructs her to touch it, transporting her to safety. Marinus remains behind with Hugo Lamb, who confesses he truly loved Holly and could not abandon her. As the chapel collapses, Marinus glimpses one final escape route.

=== Sheep’s Head, 2043 ===
In 2043, the elderly Holly Sykes lives in her grandaunt Eilish’s home on Sheep’s Head in rural Ireland. Five years have elapsed since the onset of the Endarkenment—a collapse brought on by climate change, resource depletion, and the breakdown of global infrastructure. Ireland remains relatively stable compared to the rest of Europe thanks to a now-terminated agreement with China that exchanged land for oil and limited internet access. Holly cares for her teenage granddaughter Lorelei, whose parents died in a plane crash, and Rafiq, a diabetic refugee boy from Morocco.

When the Chinese suddenly withdraw their support, Ireland descends into chaos. Government remnants and armed militias loot towns for vital resources like solar panels and fuel. A violent dispute among them leads to an internal shootout, unintentionally sparing the villagers and giving them a chance to form a local militia.

Soon after, an Icelandic vessel arrives, seeking Holly. Iceland has managed to maintain a functioning government and has come to repatriate Lorelei, whose father was Icelandic. One of the crew is revealed to be the reincarnated Marinus. Holly pleads with Marinus to also take Rafiq, whose insulin supply is running out. Though Marinus's psychic abilities are now limited, he manages to influence the crew to take both Lorelei and Rafiq. However, Holly must remain behind.

Holly bids a farewell, knowing she will never see them again. Her final heroic act would ensure the feature of the future generation.

== Principal characters ==
- Holly Sykes: the daughter of publicans who was once plagued by what she thought were auditory hallucinations.
- Hugo Lamb: an amoral university student who is recruited into the Anchorites.
- Ed Brubeck: a classmate of Holly's from Gravesend who later becomes her partner.
- Crispin Hershey: a petty middle-aged novelist who finds it difficult to accept that he is no longer as successful as he used to be.
- Marinus: an atemporal being who is reincarnated into new bodies each time her old one dies.
- Immaculée Constantin: an Anchorite who visits Holly as a young girl and who inducts Hugo Lamb into the Anchorites.
- Jacko Sykes: Holly's little brother who is actually the reincarnated form of Xi Lo.

== Relation to other works ==
The Bone Clocks contains characters from other works by Mitchell, following precedents set in his earlier novels. In interviews leading up to the release of this novel, Mitchell described this shared universe as an "uber-novel".
