= Trial by combat =

Method of settling accusations within Germanic law by dueling

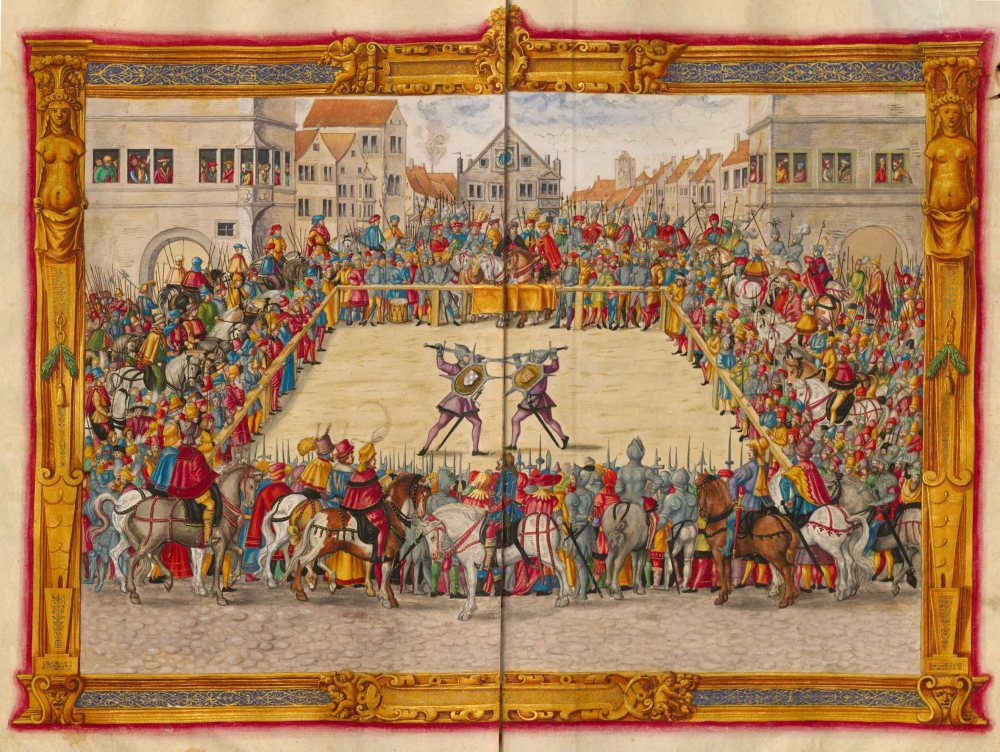
A 1540s depiction of a judicial combat in Augsburg in 1409, between Marshal Wilhelm von Dornsberg and Theodor Haschenacker. Dornsberg's sword broke early in the duel, but he proceeded to kill Haschenacker with his own sword.

Trial by combat (also wager of battle, trial by battle or judicial duel) was a method of Germanic law to settle accusations in the absence of witnesses or a confession in which two parties in dispute fought in single combat; the winner of the fight was proclaimed to be right. In essence, it was a judicially sanctioned duel. It remained in use throughout the European Middle Ages, gradually disappearing in the course of the 16th century.

== History ==
=== Origins ===
Unlike trial by ordeal in general, which is known to many cultures worldwide, trial by combat is known primarily from the customs of the Germanic peoples. The practice was "almost universal in Europe" according to medievalist Eric Jager. It was in use among the ancient Burgundians, Ripuarian Franks, Alamans, Lombards, and Swedes.

It was unknown in Anglo-Saxon law and Roman law and it does not figure in the traditions of Middle Eastern antiquity such as the code of Hammurabi or the Torah. However, it is recorded in the medieval Irish Brehon Laws, such as Din Techtugad.

The practice is regulated in various Germanic legal codes. Being rooted in Germanic tribal law, the various regional laws of the Frankish Empire (and the later Holy Roman Empire) prescribed different particulars, such as equipment and rules of combat. The Lex Alamannorum (recension Lantfridana 81, dated to 712–730 AD) prescribes a trial by combat in the event that two families disputed the boundary between their lands. A handful of earth taken from the disputed piece of land is put between the contestants and they are required to touch it with their swords, each swearing that their claim is lawful. The losing party besides forfeiting their claim to the land is required to pay a fine.

Capitularies governing its use appear from the year 803 onwards. Louis the Pious prescribed combat between witnesses of each side, rather than between the accuser and the accused, and briefly allowed for the Ordeal of the Cross in cases involving clerics.

In medieval Scandinavia, the practice survived throughout the Viking Age in the form of the holmgang.

An unusual variant, the marital duel, involved combat between a husband and wife, with the former physically handicapped in some way. The loser was killed.

=== Holy Roman Empire ===
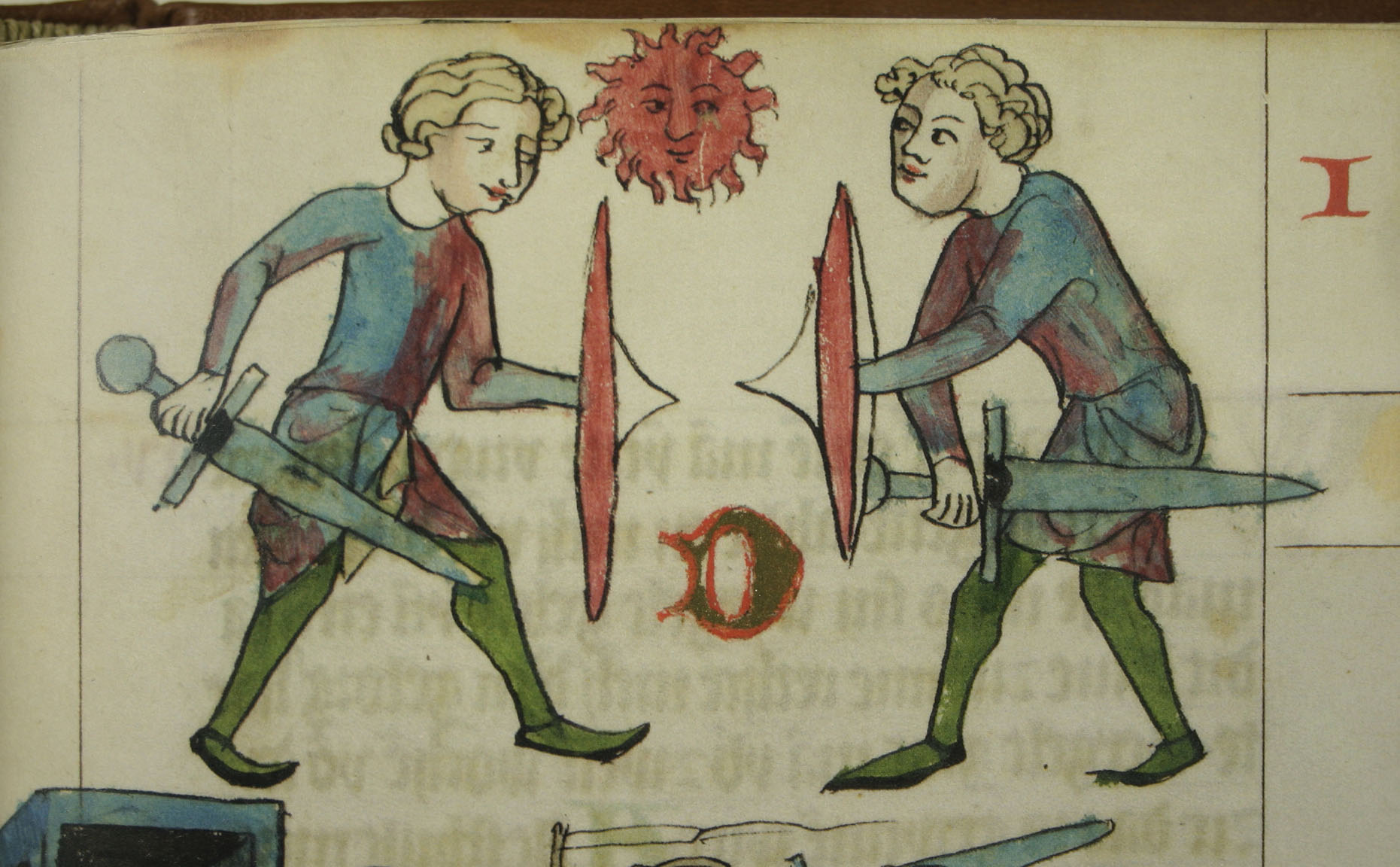
Depiction of a judicial combat in the Dresden codex of the Sachsenspiegel (early to mid-14th century), illustrating the provision that the two combatants must "share the sun", i.e. align themselves perpendicular to the Sun so that neither has an advantage

Otto the Great in 967 expressly sanctioned the practice of Germanic tribal law even if it did not figure in the more "imperial" Roman law. The celebrated case of Gero, Count of Alsleben, is a good example. The Fourth Lateran Council of 1215 deprecated judicial duels, and Pope Honorius III in 1216 asked the Teutonic Order to cease its imposition of judicial duels on their newly converted subjects in Livonia. For the following three centuries, there was latent tension between the traditional regional laws and Roman law.

The Sachsenspiegel of 1230 recognizes the judicial duel as an important function to establish guilt or innocence in cases of insult, injury, or theft. The combatants are armed with swords and shields and may wear linen and leather clothing, but their heads and feet must be bare and their hands only protected by light gloves. The accuser is to await the accused at the designated place of combat. If the accused does not appear after being summoned three times, the accuser may execute two cuts and two stabs against the wind, and his matter will be treated as if he had won the fight.

The Kleines Kaiserrecht, an anonymous legal code of c. 1300, prohibits judicial duels altogether, stating that the emperor had come to this decision on seeing that too many innocent men were convicted by the practice just for being physically weak. Nevertheless, judicial duels continued to be popular throughout the 14th and 15th centuries.

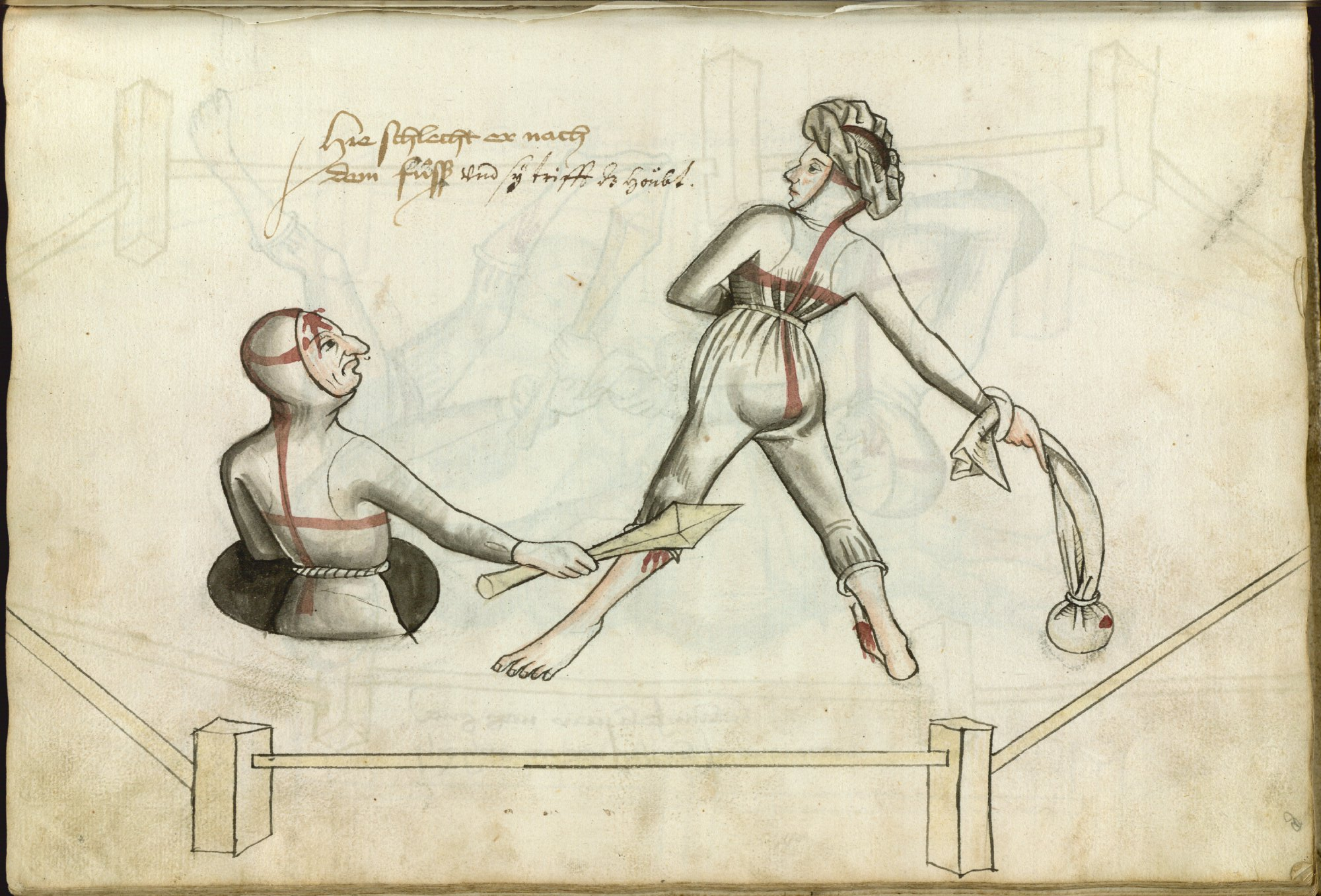
Depiction of a judicial duel between a man and a woman by Hans Talhoffer (Ms.Thott.290.2º, Folio 80r, 1459)

Trial by combat plays a significant role in the German schools of fencing in the 15th century. Notably, Hans Talhoffer depicts techniques to be applied in such duels, separately for the Swabian (sword and shield) and Franconian (mace and shield) variants, although other Fechtbücher such as that of Paulus Kal and the Codex Wallerstein show similar material. While commoners were required to present their case to a judge before duelling, members of the nobility did have the right to challenge each other for duels without the involvement of the judiciary, so that duels of this kind were separate from the judicial duel already in the Middle Ages and were not affected by the latter's abolition in the early 16th century by Emperor Maximilian I, evolving into the gentlemanly duel of modern times which was outlawed only as late as in the 19th century.

Hans Talhoffer in his 1459 Thott codex names seven offences that in the absence of witnesses were considered grave enough to warrant a judicial duel, viz. murder, treason, heresy, desertion of one's lord, "imprisonment" (possibly in the sense of abduction), perjury/fraud, and rape.

=== Great Britain and Ireland ===
Wager of battle, as the trial by combat was called in English, appears to have been introduced into the common law of the Kingdom of England following the Norman Conquest and remained in use for the duration of the High and Late Middle Ages.

The last certain trial by battle in England occurred in 1446: a servant accused his master of treason, and the master drank too much wine before the battle and was slain by the servant. In Scotland and Ireland, the practice was continued into the sixteenth century. In 1446, a trial by combat was arranged between two quarrelling Irish magnates, James Butler, 5th Earl of Ormonde, and the Prior of Kilmainham, but King Henry VI intervened personally to persuade them to settle their differences peacefully.

The wager of battle was not always available to the defendant in an appeal of murder. If the defendant were taken in the mainour (that is, in the act of committing his crime), if he attempted to escape from prison, or if there was such strong evidence of guilt that there could be no effective denial, the defendant could not challenge. Similarly, if the plaintiff was a woman, above 60 years of age, a minor, lame or blind, they could decline the challenge, and the case would be determined by a jury. Peers of the realm, priests, and citizens of the City of London (the last pursuant to their guarantee of ancient liberties under Magna Carta) could also decline the battle if challenged. If the actual battle took place, it would occur in judicial lists, 60 feet (18 m) square, following the taking of oaths against witchcraft and sorcery. If the defendant was defeated and still alive, he was to be hanged on the spot. However, if he defeated his opponent, or if he were able to fend off his opponent from sunrise to sunset, he would go free. If the plaintiff said the word craven ("I am vanquished") and gave up the fight, he was to be declared infamous, deprived of the privileges of a freeman, and was liable for damages to his successful opponent.

==== Middle Ages ====
The earliest case in which wager of battle is recorded was Wulfstan v. Walter (1077), eleven years after the Conquest. Significantly, the names of the parties suggest that it was a dispute between a Saxon and a Norman. The Tractatus of Glanvill, from around 1187, appears to have considered it the chief mode of trial, at least among aristocrats entitled to bear arms.

Around 1219, trial by jury replaced trial by ordeal, which had been the mode of proof for crown pleas since the Assize of Clarendon in 1166. With the emergence of the legal profession in the thirteenth century, lawyers, guarding the safety of the lives and limbs of their clients, steered people away from the wager of battle. A number of legal fictions were devised to enable litigants to avail themselves of the jury even in the sort of actions that were traditionally tried by wager of battle. The practice of averting trial by combat led to the modern concept of attorneys representing litigants.

Civil disputes were handled differently from criminal cases. In civil cases, women, the elderly, the infirm of body, minors, and—after 1176—the clergy could choose a jury trial or could have champions named to fight in their stead. Hired champions were technically illegal but are obvious in the record. A 1276 document among Bishop Swinefield's household records marks a promise to pay Thomas of Brydges an annual retainer fee for acting as champion, with additional stipend and expenses paid for each fight. In criminal cases, an approver was often chosen from the accomplices of the accused or from prison to do the fighting for the crown. Approvers sometimes were given their freedom after winning five trials but sometimes were hanged anyway.

In practice, a person facing trial by combat was assisted by a second, often referred to as a squire. The role of the squire was to attend the battle and to arrange the particulars of the ceremony with the opposing squire. Over time, squires would meet and resolve disputes during negotiations over combat. Ample time was made for this by creating a process for checking the saddle and bridle of horses for prayer scrolls and enchantments and requiring litigants to exchange gloves (the origin of "throwing down the gauntlet") and sometimes to go to separate churches and give five pence (for the five wounds of Christ) to the church.

Early trials by combat allowed a variety of weapons, particularly for knights. Later, commoners were given war hammers, cudgels, or quarterstaves with sharp iron tips. The duelling ground was typically sixty feet square. Commoners were allowed a rectangular leather shield and could be armed with a suit of leather armour, bare to the knees and elbows and covered by a red surcoat of a light type of silk called sendal. The litigants appeared in person. The combat was to begin before noon and be concluded before sunset.

Either combatant could end the fight and lose his case by crying out the word "Craven!", from the Old French cravanté, "defeated", which acknowledged "(I am) vanquished." The party who did so, however, whether litigant or champion, was punished with outlawry. Fighting continued until one party was dead or disabled. The last man standing won his case.

By 1300, the wager of combat had all but died out in favour of trial by jury. One of the last mass trials by combat in Scotland, the Battle of the Clans, took place in Perth in 1396. This event took the form of a pitched battle between teams of around thirty men each, representing Clan Macpherson and Clan Davidson, on the North Inch in front of King Robert III. The battle was intended to resolve a dispute over which clan was to hold the right flank in an upcoming battle of both clans (and several others) against Clan Cameron. The Clan Macpherson is thought to have won, but only twelve men survived from the original sixty.

==== Modern era ====
The last trial by combat under the authority of an English monarch is thought to have taken place during the reign of Elizabeth I in the inner courtyard of Dublin Castle in Ireland on 7 September 1583. The dispute was between members of the sept of O'Connor Faly from King's County (modern County Offaly), who were persuaded by two judges (referred to in the account below) to bring the matter before the Irish privy council for resolution.

The dispute probably concerned dynastic power within the territory of the O'Connors, and the parties, Teig and Conor, had accused each other of treason; the privy council granted their wish for trial by combat to take place on the following day, and for another such trial between two other members of the same sept to take place on the Wednesday following. The first combat took place as appointed, with the combatants "in their shirts with swords, targetts and skulles". An account of the proceedings as observed by one of the privy councillors is given in the State papers Ireland 63/104/69 (spelling adapted):

The first combat was performed at the time and place accordingly with observation of all due ceremonies as so short a time would suffer, wherein both parties showed great courage by a desperate fight: In which Conor was slain and Teig hurt but not mortally, the more was the pity: Upon this Wednesday following Mortogh Cogge [O'Connor] appeared in the same place brought by the captains to the listes, and there stayed 2 hours making proclamation against his enemy by drum and trumpet, but he appeared not ... The only thing we commend in this action was the diligent travail of Sir Lucas Dillon and the Master of the Rolls [Nicholas White], who equally and openly seemed to countenance the champions, but secretly with very good concurrence, both with us and between themselves, with such regard of her Majesty's service, as giveth us cause to commend them to your Lordships.

The Annals of the Four Masters also refers to the trial and censures the parties for having allowed the English to entice them into the proceedings. It is also referred to in Holinshed's chronicles. This was a trial not at common law but under consiliar jurisdiction.

It is uncertain when the last actual trial by battle in Britain took place. While some references speak of such a trial being held in 1631, records indicate that King Charles I intervened to prevent the battle. A 1638 case is less clear: it involved a legal dispute between Ralf Claxton and Richard Lilburne (the latter the father of John Lilburne). The king again stepped in, and judges acted to delay proceedings. No record survives of the outcome of the case, but no contemporary account speaks of the trial by battle actually taking place. The last certain judicial battle in Britain was in Scotland in 1597, when Adam Bruntfield accused James Carmichael of murder and killed him in battle.

Proposals to abolish trial by battle were made in the 17th century, and twice in the 18th, but were unsuccessful. In 1774, as part of the legislative response to the Boston Tea Party, Parliament considered a bill that would have abolished appeals of murder and trials by battle in the American colonies. It was successfully opposed by Member of Parliament John Dunning, who called the appeal of murder "that great pillar of the Constitution". Writer and MP Edmund Burke, on the other hand, supported the abolition, calling the appeal and wager "superstitious and barbarous to the last degree".

The writ of right was the most direct way, in the common law, of challenging someone's right to a piece of real property. The criminal appeal was a private criminal prosecution instituted by the accuser directly against the accused. It was not, unlike the contemporary appeal, a proceeding in a court of superior jurisdiction reviewing the proceedings of a lower court.

Such a private prosecution was last conducted in the case of Ashford v Thornton in 1818. Pronouncing judgment in favour of the accused's plea claiming the wager of battle, Justice Bayley of the King's Bench said that:

One inconvenience attending this mode of proceeding is, that the party who institutes it must be willing, if required, to stake his life in support of his accusation.

Parliament abolished wager of battle the following year, in February 1819, in an Act (Appeal of Murder, etc. Act 1819) introduced by the Attorney General Samuel Shepherd. At the same time, the writ of right and criminal appeals was also abolished.

In more recent times, members of the sovereign citizen movement and other novel legal theorists have occasionally claimed that the right to trial by battle still holds. In 2002, mechanic Leon Humphries from Bury St Edmunds challenged the DVLA to "raise a champion" over a £25 SORN penalty notice. His request was refused by a magistrates court and he was subsequently fined £200 for failing to pay the notice.

=== France ===
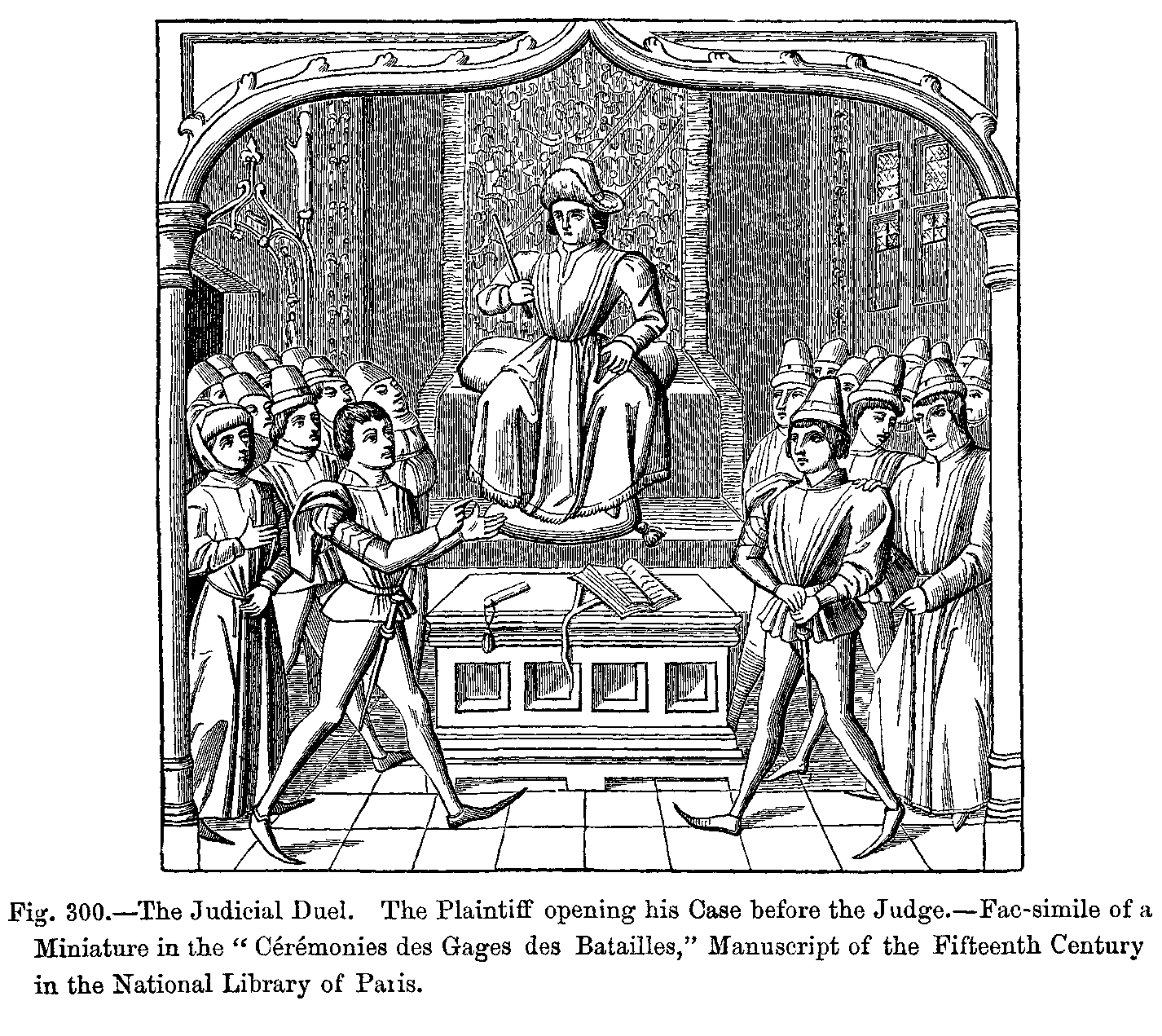
"The plaintiff opening his case before the judge", from Cérémonies des Gages des Batailles (15th century), National Library of Paris

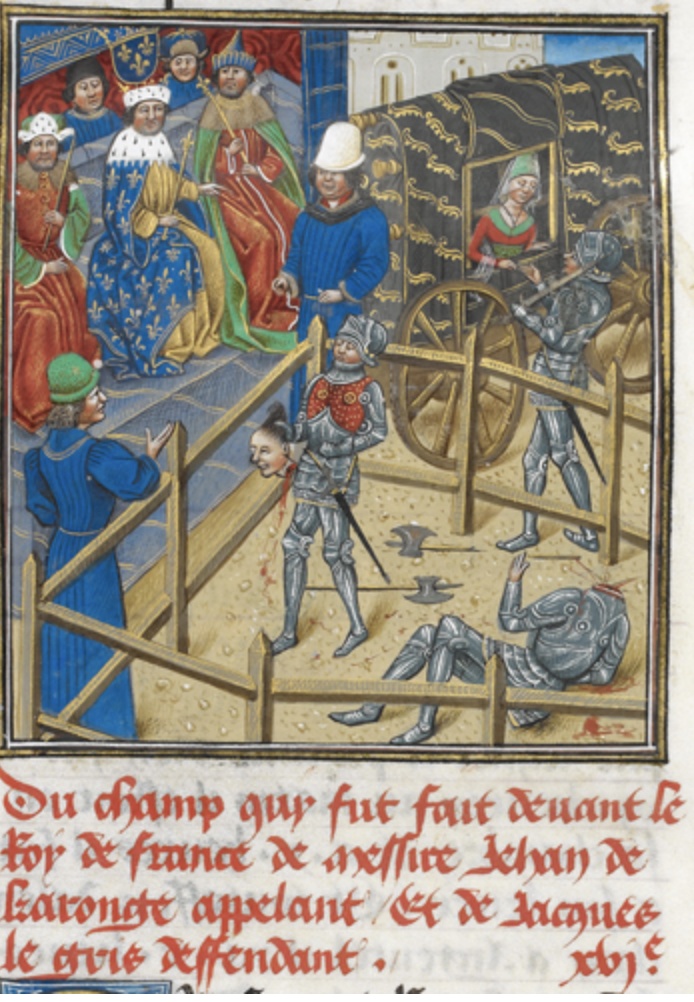
Duel between Jacques Le Gris and Jean de Carrouges

According to Gregory of Tours, King Childebert II ordered for two of his servants to engage in trial by combat against each other when he found a buffalo had been killed in his forest and one accused the other of the crime.

==== Judicial combat of 1386 ====
In December 1386, one of the last trials by combat authorised by the French King Charles VI was fought in Paris. The trial was fought to decide a case brought by Sir Jean de Carrouges against squire Jacques le Gris, whom he accused of raping his wife Marguerite when Carrouges was in Paris conducting business. After lengthy hearings at the Parlement of Paris, with Jacques le Gris claiming that he had not committed the crime and Marguerite being with child, it was decided that guilt could not be decided through a standard jury trial, and a judicial duel was ordered. The duel put four lives in the hands of fate: Jacques le Gris, the accused, Jean de Carrouges, the accuser, Marguerite, and her unborn child. In the duel, the survivor of the said duel would be considered the winner of the claim. If Jacques le Gris won the duel, not only would Jean de Carrouges die but his pregnant wife would also be put to death for the crime of being a false accuser.

In late December, shortly after Christmas, the combatants met just outside the walls of the abbey of Saint-Martin-des-Champs in the northern Paris suburbs. After a lengthy ceremony, the battle was joined, and after a furious and bloody encounter, Carrouges stabbed his opponent with a sword and claimed victory, being rewarded with substantial financial gifts and a position in the royal household. The duel was watched by the royal court, several royal dukes, and thousands of ordinary Parisians and was recorded in several notable chronicles including Froissart's Chronicles and Grandes Chroniques de France. It has since been covered by several notable texts, including Diderot's Encyclopédie, Voltaire and the 11th edition of Encyclopædia Britannica, and also by the 2004 book The Last Duel by Eric Jager.

=== Italy ===
About AD 630, Gundeberga, wife of the Lombard King Arioald (626–636), is supposed to have been accused by a disappointed lover of a plot to poison the king and take another man. King Arioald consented that her innocence should be tested by single combat between her accuser and a nobleman who undertook to defend her. The accuser having been slain, Gundeberga was declared innocent. This was the first instance of a trial by combat in the history of Italy. In the 730s, the Lombard king Liutprand (712–744) had lost confidence in the likelihood that the trial by battle would provide justice. He knew that the practice was subject to abuse.

The jurisprudence of judicial duelling in Italy is particularly well documented in the 15th and 16th centuries. In particular, the treatises of Achille Marozzo (1536), Giovanni Battista Pigna (1554) and Girolamo Mutio (1560) have contributed to shed considerable light on the subject.

The fundamental aspects of Italy's duelling customs were the following. The offended party (attore or agent) had to accuse the defendant (reo) of an injury of words or deeds he received, in matters that could not be reliably proven in a courtroom. In turn, the defendant had to issue a "mentita", meaning that he had to tell the agent "you lie", which consisted of an injury of words. After this, the agent had to issue a notarised cartello, or a notice of challenge, to the defendant, which, if accepted, would set the formal proceedings in motion.

The defendant had the important advantage of the election of weapons. This was done to ensure that the institution would not be abused by the strong to overpower the weak, although the system was gamed in many ways bordering on the illegal.

The duel would take place on the land of a lord impartial to both parties, or if this was not practicable, alla macchia, meaning on public lands. The herald read the accusation out loud and gave the defendant one last chance to confess. If the latter did not do so, the duel would begin, and it was the responsibility of the issuer of the challenge to deliver (or attempt) the first blow. Incapacitating injuries or death would dictate victory, although other scenarios were possible as well. For instance, if the defendant could successfully parry all blows delivered by the agent until sundown, the defendant would be considered the victor.

With the Counter-Reformation of the 16th century, dueling became illegal; however, its customs were maintained and utilized by most middle to upper social classes until the beginning of the 19th century.

=== India ===
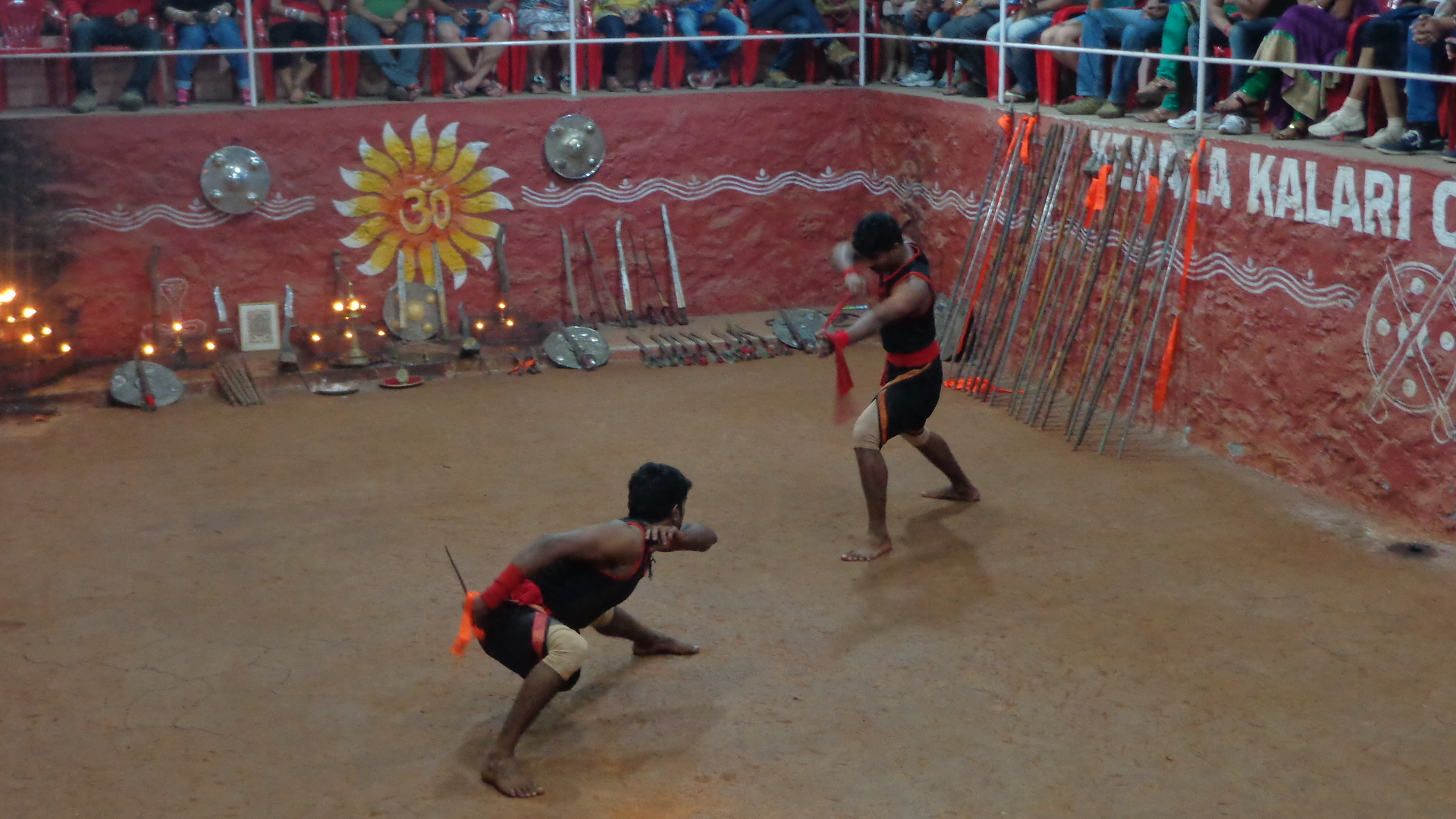
Kalaripayattu combat

In the 12th century in the Malabar region of India, the same Kalaripayattu competition was held by the Thiyya caste, who are the Chekavars. A special kind of fighter called a chekvar was engaged to duel another chekavar on behalf of two opposing rulers to prevent the explosion of a blood feud. For this two chekavar fight each other in an arena for the king and die. For this they used sword and parija. When one of the chekavar defeated or killed the other in the public duel called the ankam, the two parties considered the matter closed without either having spilled any of their own blood. Kalaripayattu, the most ancient and important form of India, was practiced in Kerala. Its origins date back to the 12th century. Unniyarcha, Aromal Chekavar and others were warriors of Chekavar lineage. It was during their period that kalaripayattu spread widely in southern Kerala.

=== United States ===
At the time of independence in 1776, trial by combat had not been abolished and it has never formally been abolished since. The question of whether trial by combat remains a valid alternative to civil action has been argued to remain open, at least in theory. In McNatt v. Richards (1983), the Delaware Court of Chancery rejected the defendant's request for "trial by combat to the death" on the grounds that dueling was illegal. In Forgotten Trial Techniques: The Wager of Battle, Donald J. Evans set out the possibility of a trial by battle in the setting of a lawyer's office. A tongue-in-cheek motion during 2015 for trial by combat in response to a civil suit was rejected in 2016.

In 2020, a man named David Zachary Ostrom requested a trial by combat in response to a custody and property dispute with his ex-wife over their children. Following Ostrom requesting trial by combat, he was court-ordered to be administered a sanity test and was temporarily restricted from parenting rights. Upon successfully clearing his sanity test, Ostrom's parenting time was restored. Ostrom has since admitted that he initially made the request for trial by combat in order to attract media attention to his case.

== In fiction ==
Walter Scott's 1828 novel The Fair Maid of Perth dramatizes the lead-up to the Battle of the North Inch, where a judicial duel is among the violent events culminating in a judicial battle between the clans before King Robert III of Scotland.

The Carrouges–le Gris trial of 1386 was the subject of a 2004 book by Eric Jager. This book was adapted into a 2008 BBC Four documentary and dramatized in a 2021 film.

Tyrion Lannister from Game of Thrones and A Song of Ice and Fire is put through two trials by combat, with the second trial forcing him to flee after he was falsely convicted of killing Joffrey Baratheon.

The player character in Final Fantasy XIV: Heavensward as part of the required main story questline must participate in a trial by combat to clear the names of their non-player companion characters of Alphinaud Leveilleur and Tataru Taru, after they both are accused of heresy while attempting to gather information in the city of Ishgard. Tataru Taru is lacking in combat ability, and chooses the player character as her champion to fight on her behalf.

== See also ==
- Battle royal – Fight involving three or more combatants
- Fencing – Type of armed combat sport
- Gladiator – Roman combatant for entertainment
- Gravi de pugna – Forged letter by Augustine of Hippo about just war
- Might makes right – View that morality is, or ought to be, determined by those in power
- Subpoena ad testificandum – Court order to give testimony
- Subpoena duces tecum – Court order to produce evidence
