= Jacques le Gris =

14th-century French squire and knight

Sir Jacques le Gris
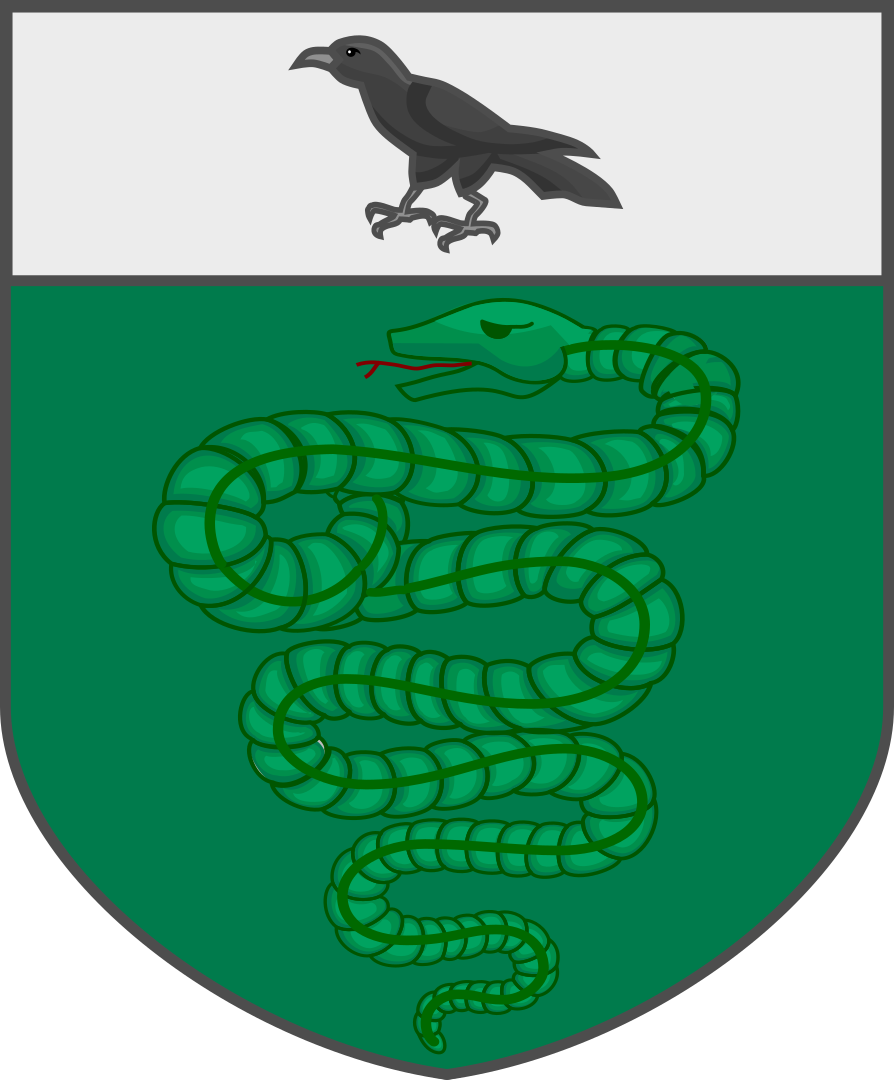
- The coat of arms attributed to Sir Jacques le Gris in The Last Duel, based on a coat of arms used by descendant Guiliaume le Gris du Clos in 1696.
- Born: c. 1330s Normandy, France
- Died: 29 December 1386 (aged c. 56); Paris, France
- Military career
- Allegiance: Kingdom of France
- Service years: 1370–1386
- Rank: Captain of Exmes
- Conflicts: Hundred Years' War
- Awards: Lord of Aunou-le-Faucon

Sir Jacques le Gris (lit. "the Gray") (c. 1330s – 29 December 1386) was a French squire and knight who gained fame and infamy, and was ultimately killed when he engaged in one of the last judicial duels permitted by the Parlement of Paris after he was accused of rape by Marguerite de Carrouges, the wife of his neighbour and rival, Jean de Carrouges. Carrouges brought legal proceedings against Le Gris before King Charles VI who, after hearing the evidence, authorised a trial by combat to determine the question. The duel attracted thousands of spectators and has been discussed by many notable French writers, from the contemporary Jean Froissart to Voltaire.

Described as a large and physically imposing man, and rumoured to be a womaniser, Le Gris was a liegeman (feudal retainer) of Count Pierre d'Alençon and a favourite at his court, governing a large swathe of his liege lord's territory, in addition to his own ancestral holdings. Le Gris' insistence on defending his case by chivalric trial by combat, rather than opting for the safer church trial (to which, as a cleric in minor orders, he was entitled), attracted widespread support for his cause amongst the French nobility.

== Early life ==
Jacques le Gris was born in the 1330s, the son of Guillaume le Gris, a minor Norman squire. Unusual for the time, he was educated, taking minor orders as a cleric in the church, and able to read sufficiently well to officiate at mass. Like his father, Le Gris was first a man-at-arms, and then a squire, in the service of the Count of Perche, a role at which he excelled. He also participated in several minor military campaigns in Normandy, in the entourage of Robert d'Alençon.

At some point in his life, Le Gris also married, and fathered several sons; who, in turn, had descendants of their own.

In 1370, his long service was rewarded when he was given command of one of his liege lord's castles at the village of Exmes. During his career, he became firm friends with Jean de Carrouges, another squire in the count's service. Carrouges and Le Gris were so close that, in 1377, the same year that Count Robert died, Carrouges made Le Gris godfather to his eldest son, a position of great responsibility and trust.

With the arrival of Count Robert's brother, Pierre d'Alençon, the friendship between the two squires became strained. Le Gris was able, amiable, and intelligent, and soon became one of the new count's favourites. When Count Pierre moved his court to Argentan, Le Gris lent him 3,000 livres and, in reward, was confirmed as Seigneur (Lord) of Exmes, and given a valuable estate at Aunou-le-Faucon. As Le Gris rose in his lord's esteem, the poorer Carrouges was frequently overlooked, resulting in a deterioration in their friendship which was only worsened by the death of Carrouges' wife and son in 1380, severing the men's family ties.

Shortly after the death of his family, Carrouges departed on campaign in Upper Normandy while Le Gris – thanks to his literacy and military skills – rose steadily in importance in Count Pierre's court, traveling with the count when he went to Paris on business. During these trips, Count Pierre introduced Le Gris to the royal court and was instrumental in gaining him the prestigious title of Royal Steward, a position within the household of the King, Charles VI.

=== Legal difficulties ===
In 1381, Le Gris and Carrouges engaged in a public argument over the domain of Aunou-le-Faucon. Carrouges had returned from the wars with a new bride, Marguerite de Thibouville, daughter of a controversial Norman squire who, until recently, had owned Aunou. Although the lands had been legally bought by Count Pierre in 1377 for 8,000 livres, Carrouges wanted them back as part of his dowry and took Count Pierre to court to return them. Pierre was forced to visit his cousin, the King, to obtain royal approval for his purchase and consequently was furious with Carrouges. The eventual result was that Carrouges was isolated from the court and subjected to three years of legal struggles over land with Count Pierre, who denied him the purchase or inheritance of several estates. Le Gris was heavily involved in these legal disputes both as the Seigneur of Aunou-le-Faucon and as an adviser to the count. He thus became a target of Carrouges, who accused Le Gris of orchestrating the lawsuits against him.

A rapprochement between the two men was achieved in the winter of 1384, when Carrouges and Le Gris were both invited to the estate of a mutual friend, Jean Crespin, to celebrate the birth of his son. For the first time, Carrouges brought his wife Marguerite into society and it was at this party that she made her first acquaintance with Le Gris. Despite the tension between them, Carrouges and Le Gris shook hands and drank together, putting their quarrel behind them before their peers and neighbours.

A few months later, Jean de Carrouges departed on a campaign to Scotland in 1385 as part of France's Auld Alliance with Scotland, serving under commander Jean de Vienne, and Le Gris took the opportunity to increase his influence with Count Pierre, making substantial financial and territorial gains in his rival's absence. Carrouges returned a year later, now a knight but bankrupt, ill, and suffering the aftermath of a long and unsuccessful campaign. When Carrouges appeared at Argentan in January 1386, he was involved in a confrontation with his erstwhile friend. Although it is not known what was said, the two men separated on poor terms, and Carrouges departed for Paris in a state of agitation.

== On trial for rape ==
"The lady, unaware of his evil design, had led him about like a good friend here and there and taken him to the guest-chamber. Then he was unable to conceal his savage intention. For immediately he began to confess his love, and to implore, and to mix gifts with prayers and to harass the woman's spirit in every way. And when he fearfully saw her constant spirit, improper love made him bold, and throwing her down with his left arm he robbed the storeroom of her chastity and gave the victory to desire."
Accusations from the Chronique du Religieux de Saint-Denys.

Some weeks after their encounter, word reached Le Gris of accusations being made against him by Carrouges and his wife. Carrouges claimed that on 18 January 1386, whilst Carrouges was still in Paris, Le Gris had entered the chateau of Carrouges' mother Nicole and raped Marguerite. According to Marguerite de Carrouges' testimony, a squire in Le Gris' employ named Adam Louvel had knocked on the door of the chateau and demanded entry. All the servants were attending to Dame Nicole de Carrouges, who was visiting a neighbouring town on legal business, and so Marguerite was alone when Louvel called. Once inside, Louvel gave Marguerite a message that Le Gris was outside and desired to see her because he was passionately in love with her. Although Marguerite protested, Le Gris broke into the house and proposed sexual intercourse with her, offering money in exchange. When Marguerite refused, Le Gris forcibly raped her on the bed in her chamber with the help of Louvel. As Le Gris departed, he threatened her with violence if she told of the encounter.

Charges were brought by the Carrouges' faction against Le Gris in the court of Count Pierre but Carrouges and his wife refused to attend the hearing, so convinced were they of receiving unfair treatment from the count. Count Pierre backed his favourite in the trial, clearing Le Gris and accusing Marguerite of inventing or "dreaming" the charges. Undeterred, Carrouges then visited the court of King Charles VI at the Château de Vincennes and appealed to the King for the right to challenge Le Gris to a judicial duel to allow God to decide the case. The King referred the case to the Parlement of Paris, where both claimants were expected to appear on 9 July.

Informed of the King's decision, Le Gris contacted Jean Le Coq, widely considered the best lawyer of the day in France. Le Coq kept meticulous notes of the entire trial process and it is through his record that many of the facts of the case are known. Le Coq also comments in his records his own suspicions about his client, whose claims of innocence he considered to be false. Le Gris was urged by his family and lawyer to insist on being tried in a church court, which was his right as a cleric in minor orders. This would have given him a more favourable hearing in a court that did not condone trial by combat and thus would also be much safer. Le Gris rebuffed this advice and became angry when challenged on the decision, insisting on his right to a trial before the Parlement.

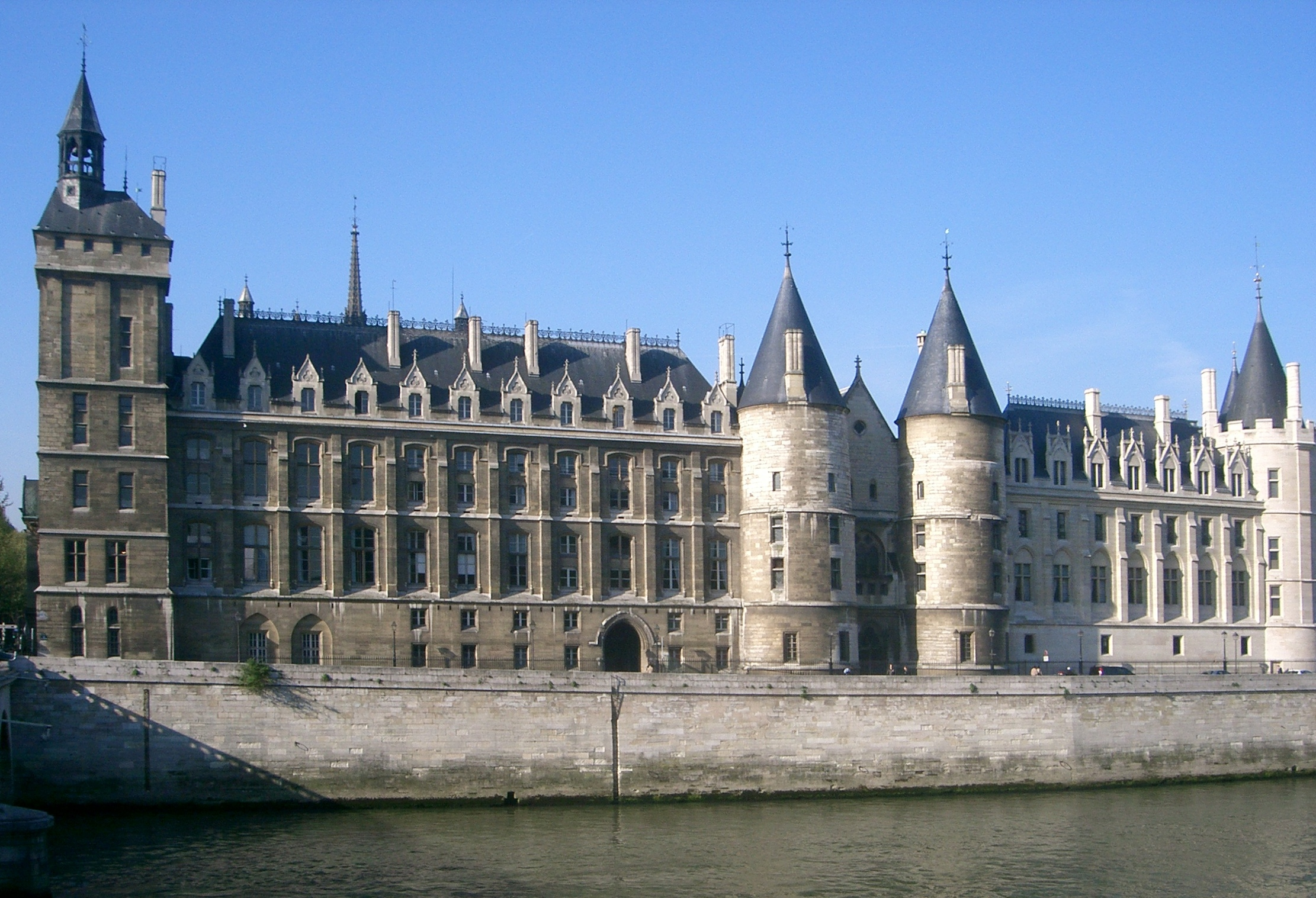
Palais de Justice, Paris, where the trial was held

On 9 July 1386, at the Palais de Justice in Paris the two claimants faced each other for the first time since their confrontation at Argentan several months before. Each stepped before the Parlement in turn and presented their case for the King and court, Carrouges throwing down his gauntlet in a challenge and Le Gris picking it up, signifying his acceptance of the duel. Le Gris also embellished his case by insisting that should he be proven innocent of the offence, he would sue Carrouges or his estate for 40,000 livres. Following the declarations, a number of high-ranking noblemen stepped forward to act as seconds in the duel for both men, including Waleran of Saint-Pol for Carrouges and Philip of Artois, Count of Eu for Le Gris. After hearing the challenges and accusations, the Parlement and King debated the case and decided that a full hearing of the evidence from witnesses would be held to determine guilt. If the case could not be decided by normal means, then a judicial duel would be held to adjudicate the dispute, with God choosing the victor.

During the criminal trial, all the major figures in the case were called on to give evidence. Le Gris and Carrouges began proceedings and were followed by a heavily pregnant Marguerite and at least one of her maidservants as well as Adam Louvel. As people of low birth, Louvel and the servants were all subject to torture to test the veracity of their testimony, but none gave evidence against Le Gris and the case continued through the summer and into September without conclusion. Le Gris' case involved several strategies; he attempted to discredit his opponent by telling of Carrouges' infamous temper and describing the case against him as a jealous invention from a man who had threatened to beat his wife if she did not corroborate his accusations. Le Gris then provided alibis for the entire week in question, establishing his whereabouts in testimony backed up by several other squires of the court of Count Pierre. Finally, he attempted to demonstrate in court that it was physically impossible for him to have ridden in winter from Argentan to Capomesnil, where the crime supposedly took place, in a single day, a round trip of approximately 50 miles (80 km).

As the trial progressed, however, Le Gris' testimony suffered several blows. The unwavering accusations directed at him by Marguerite despite the shame such accusations brought to her were, in the eyes of the court, a powerful reason why the charges could not have been invented. One of the men providing Le Gris' alibi, Jean Beloteau, was arrested in Paris during the trial and charged with rape himself. This charge seriously undermined Beloteau's testimony and Le Gris' defence. Finally, Carrouges himself offered counter-testimony in court that a healthy, strong man with long experience of horsemanship and a stable full of horses like Le Gris could certainly have made the 50 mile trip without difficulty, even accounting for the snow.

== Judicial duel ==
Faced with such conflicting accounts and unable to reach a conclusion, the Parlement announced on 15 September that the two men would fight to the death on 27 November 1386 to decide guilt in the case. If Carrouges lost, then Marguerite would be burnt at the stake for perjury. King Charles VI, who was on campaign with his court in Flanders, ordered the duel to be postponed until 29 December as he did not want to miss what was rapidly becoming the event of the season.

On the day decreed, Le Gris and Carrouges travelled through Paris to the Abbey of Saint-Martin-des-Champs, which at the time was in the city's northern suburbs. The abbey's field had been converted from a jousting ground to a wooden arena especially for the combat, surrounded by banks for the spectators and a royal box. The King; his uncles John, Duke of Berry, Philip the Bold, and Louis II, Duke of Bourbon; and his brother the Duke of Orléans joined thousands of ordinary Parisians, Normans, and visiting French to attend the duel. The commoners in attendance were warned that anyone who did not keep quiet would lose a hand and anyone who attempted to aid either combatant would be executed.

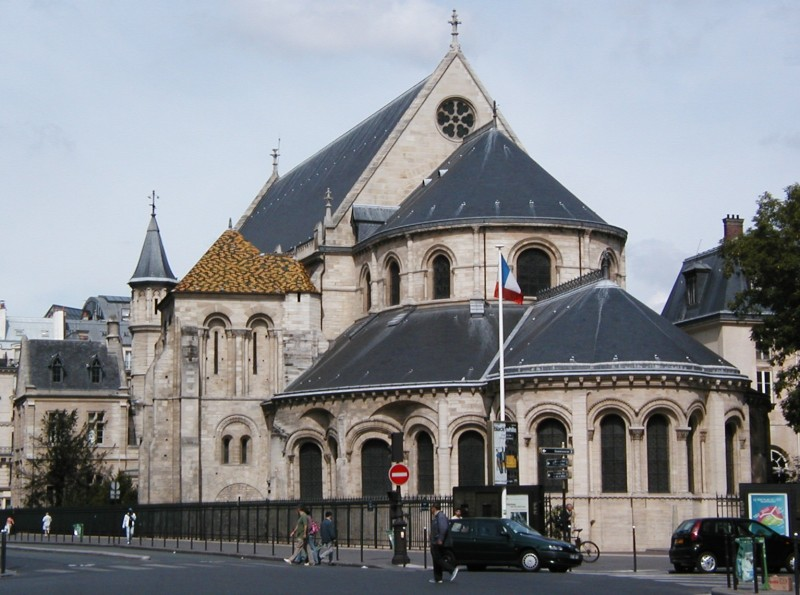
Saint-Martin-des-Champs

Although legal accounts do not describe the course of the combat, contemporary chroniclers have left several records of the day's battle. According to the chronicles, the claimants entered the field last and before all present repeated their accusations against the other and swore oaths guaranteeing their honesty before the King, Parliament, and God. Before they remounted, the marshal of the duel performed a brief ceremony in which he knighted Jacques Le Gris. This ceremony was traditional before the battle but also performed a part in maintaining the social structure of medieval France. With both men on the same social footing, there would be no defeat of a senior rank by a lesser one. Having been raised to the status of a knight, Sir Jacques regained his horse and the arena was cleared. Both knights were heavily armed and armoured, protected by a hide and wood shield bearing their coat of arms and thick plate armour, riding a heavy warhorse and wielding a lance, longsword, heavy battle axe, and long dagger known as a misericorde.

At the marshal's signal, silence descended over the field and both knights spurred their horses and charged, their lances each striking the other's shield but not causing significant damage. Wheeling, both again struck, but failed to penetrate, scoring glancing blows on their helmets but remaining horsed. For a third time, they turned and charged and again they both struck. This time however the lances shattered, sending slivers of wood cartwheeling across the arena and nearly unseating both men. Regaining their balance, the knights closed on one another with battle axes drawn, trading furious two-handed blows. As the engagement progressed, Le Gris' superior strength began to tell and Carrouges was driven back until with a mighty swing, Le Gris' axe severed the spine of Carrouges' horse. The dying beast tumbled to the ground, Carrouges leaping clear and meeting Le Gris' charge with a side-step, allowing him to thrust his own axe's pike deep into the stomach of Le Gris' steed.

"Sir Jean de Carogne was, at the first onset, wounded in the thigh, which alarmed all his friends: notwithstanding this, he fought so desperately that he struck down his adversary, and, thrusting his sword through the body, caused instant death; when he demanded of the spectators if he had done his duty: they replied that he had. The body of Jacques le Gris was delivered to the hangman, who dragged it to Montfaucon, and there hanged it."
Froissart's Chronicles, Book III, Chapter 46.

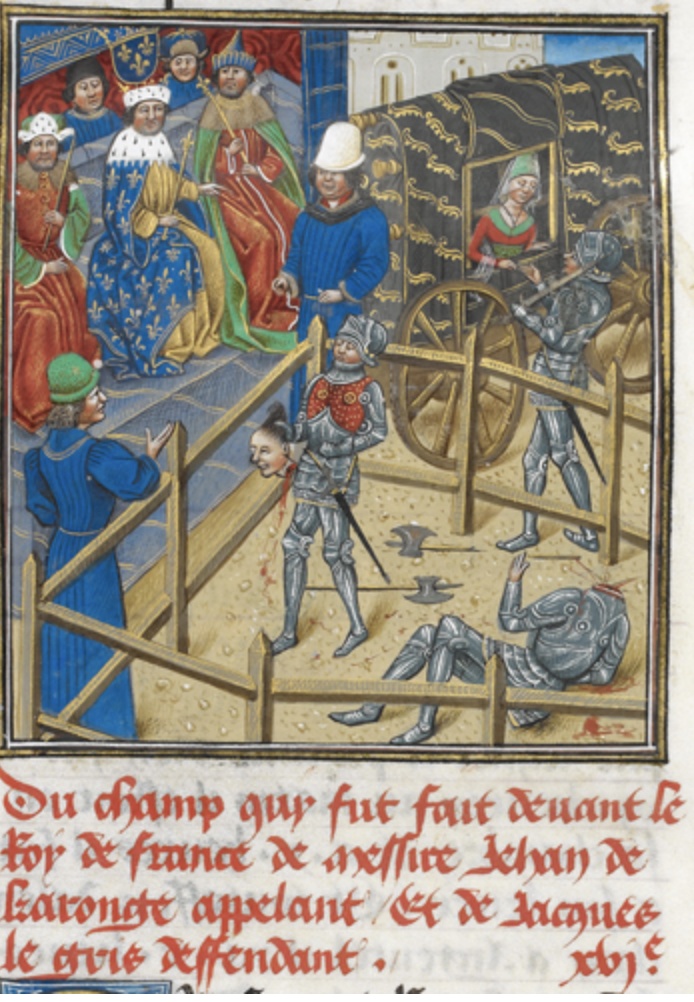
The aftermath of the duel between Jacques Le Gris and Jean de Carrouges.

As his horse faltered and collapsed, Le Gris was thrown off and lost his axe. Undaunted, he rose and drew his longsword, turning to meet Carrouges who was already advancing on him, sword also drawn. Again the combatants traded blows, their weapons the only sounds heard in the silent battleground. Again, Le Gris' superior strength gave him an advantage, pushing Carrouges back before thrusting his blade through his opponent's thigh. As the crowd murmured, Le Gris made a fatal mistake; withdrawing his weapon, he stepped back to watch his wounded enemy and was thus off balance when the desperate Carrouges threw himself forwards, wrestling Le Gris to the ground and hacking at him with his own longsword. Although Le Gris' plate armour was too thick to allow Carrouges' weapon to penetrate, it was also so heavy that he could not regain his feet with Carrouges on top of him. Stranded on the ground, Le Gris struggled as Carrouges straddled him and used his sword to smash open the lock on Le Gris' faceplate. As the crowd watched in silence, Carrouges shouted in Le Gris' exposed face for him to confess his crime before death or face Hell. Le Gris replied so all could hear, "In the name of God, and on the peril and damnation of my soul, I am innocent of the crime." Enraged, Carrouges drew his misericorde and thrust it through Le Gris' throat, killing him instantly.

At Le Gris' death, the crowd cheered and the King greeted the victor with several fine presents. Carrouges became a wealthy and famous man as a result of his victory, but, despite his end, Le Gris was not forgotten. In the duel's immediate aftermath, the Executioner of Paris took charge of the body and stripped its armour and clothing before dragging it through the streets to the Gibbet of Montfaucon. There it was strung up alongside the bodies of murderers and thieves to rot before eventually being flung into a common grave. However, the memory of Jacques Le Gris was kept alive by his family and supporters for many years. His son Guillaume Le Gris paid over 200 francs for masses to be said for his father, "a man of noble memory," and continued to pay similar sums for at least ten years after his death. Count Pierre too retained favourable memories of his advisor, taking revenge by blocking Carrouges' efforts to purchase more land or expand his influence in Normandy.

== Legacy ==
In the centuries since Le Gris' death, the case has become an important cultural legend in France. The duel was one of the last trials by combat ever permitted by the Parlement de Paris or the French Kings and the guilt or innocence of its participants has been a source of great debate among historians and jurists. The contemporary chronicler Jean Froissart harbours no question over the guilt of Le Gris, whom he considers a villain. Later writers take a different view, including the Grandes Chroniques de France and the works of Jehan de Waurin, who repeat with varying details an unverifiable tale of an unnamed culprit admitting his guilt after being condemned to death for an unidentified crime. During the Enlightenment, the duel was revisited by Boucher d'Argis, who repeated this story of the anonymous criminal's confession in Diderot's Encyclopédie, and by Voltaire in his Histoire du Parlement de Paris. An imaginative version of the legend was repeated in the Encyclopædia Britannica until the 1970s.

Legal studies conducted in the 2000s by French jurists generally considered it likely that Le Gris was the real culprit based on Marguerite's evidence, although none, of course, could prove so conclusively. A major exception to this trend was a book written in 1890 by a descendant of Le Gris named F. White Le Grix, who makes a determined effort to defend his ancestor. (Note: Jager considers this book to be very poorly researched.) Most recently, the story was studied in Eric Jager's work The Last Duel: A True Story of Crime, Scandal, and Trial by Combat in Medieval France, which also considers Le Gris the likely rapist.

Jager's book was adapted into a feature film of the same name, directed by Ridley Scott, and released in 2021. Le Gris is portrayed by Adam Driver.

== Bibliography ==
- Froissart, Jehan (1804). Chronicles of England, France and the Adjoining Countries, from the Latter Part of the Reign of Edward II to the Coronation of Henry IV. Vol. 3. Translated by Johnes, Thomas.
- Bellaguet, M.L., ed. (1839). "An Account of the Duel between Jean de Carrouges and Jacques le Gris in the Chronicle of the Monk of St. Denis". Chronique du Religieux de Saint-Denys. Translated by Muhlberger, Steven. Paris: Crapelet.
- Jager, Eric (16 January 2005). "A Fatal Medieval Triangle". UCLA College of Letters and Sciences. Archived from the original on 14 August 2007.
- Jager, Eric (2005). The Last Duel: A True Story of Crime, Scandal, and Trial by Combat in Medieval France. London: Century. ISBN 0-7126-6190-5. OCLC 59199040.
