= Jean de Carrouges =

French knight (late 1330s – 1396)

Sir Jean de Carrouges
- Jean de Carrouges' coat of arms.
- Born: late 1330s Carrouges, Normandy
- Died: 25 September 1396; Nicopolis, Ottoman Empire
- Spouses: Jeanne de Tilly (m c. 1371; died 1378); Marguerite de Thibouville (m. 1380)
- Military career
- Allegiance: Kingdom of France
- Conflicts: Hundred Years' War; campaigns in Normandy and Scotland, Crusade of Nicopolis

Sir Jean de Carrouges IV (late 1330s – 25 September 1396) was a French knight who held estates in Normandy as a vassal of Count Pierre d'Alençon and who served under Admiral Jean de Vienne in several campaigns against the Kingdom of England. In 1386 he fought a judicial duel against his neighbour and former friend, the squire Jacques le Gris, whom he had accused of raping his wife Marguerite while he was away on campaign. Carrouges killed Le Gris, and the combat was the last judicial duel authorised by the Parlement of Paris.

The duel was one of three high-profile wagers of battle fought in the last four months of 1386, and the most famous of them. It was watched by King Charles VI and much of the French nobility, along with thousands of Parisians, and was recorded in the following decades by chroniclers including Jean Froissart, Jean Juvénal des Ursins and Jean de Waurin.

Carrouges was described in the chronicles as a rash and temperamental man. He served in Normandy, Scotland and Hungary over a military career of some forty years, and after the duel was attached to the royal household in Paris as a chevalier d'honneur and royal bodyguard. He was killed at the Battle of Nicopolis in 1396.

== Early life ==
Carrouges was born in the late 1330s in the village of Sainte-Marguerite-de-Carrouges, the eldest son of the knight Sir Jean de Carrouges III and his wife, Nicole de Buchard. (Note: The name is spelled variously in the sources. Froissart calls him "Jean de Caronge", sometimes anglicised in translation to John; the Chronique du Religieux de Saint-Denys and most modern writers use "Jean de Carrouges".) His father was an influential man in lower Normandy, a vassal of the Count of Perche and a veteran of his campaigns. He was rewarded for long service in the Hundred Years' War with a knighthood and the title of Viscount of Bellême, which brought command of the hill castle overlooking the town and the office of sheriff in the district.

Carrouges grew up on his father's domain, centred on the village of Carrouges where the family held a hereditary castle. He followed his father into the service of the Counts of Perche and served in several minor campaigns against the English and routiers in Normandy. On reaching his majority at twenty-one he was given a parcel of the family lands to administer. In 1367 the family castle and the village of Carrouges were destroyed by English soldiers, and a new castle was built on a nearby hilltop under instructions from Charles V of France.

In the early 1370s Carrouges married Jeanne de Tilly, a daughter of the Lord of Chambois, whose dowry included lands and rents important to his ambition of expanding the family estates. Shortly after the wedding Jeanne gave birth to a son, whose godfather was Carrouges' neighbour and close friend, the squire Jacques le Gris. In 1377 Pierre d'Alençon inherited his brother Robert's county of Perche, and with it the fealty of his brother's vassals, including both Carrouges and Le Gris. The two men joined the count's court circle at Argentan.

It was at Argentan that the friendship deteriorated, as Le Gris became a favourite of Count Pierre. While Carrouges was passed over, Le Gris inherited his father's lordship of the castle at Exmes and was granted a newly purchased estate at Aunou-le-Faucon. A year after entering the count's service Carrouges lost both his wife and his son to illness. He then joined the service of Jean de Vienne with a retinue of nine squires, and served in actions against the English at Beuzeville, Carentan and Coutances during a five-month campaign in which over half his retinue were killed in battle or died of disease.

== Marguerite de Thibouville ==
Returning home in 1380, Carrouges married Marguerite de Thibouville, the only daughter of Robert de Thibouville, a Norman lord who had twice sided against the French king in territorial conflicts. By the marriage Thibouville hoped to restore his family's standing, while Carrouges hoped for an heir.

Shortly after the marriage Carrouges began a lawsuit to recover the estate of Aunou-le-Faucon, which had formerly belonged to his father-in-law and had been bought by Count Pierre in 1377 before being granted to Le Gris. The case ran for some months until Pierre was obliged to visit his cousin King Charles VI to confirm his ownership of the land and his right to grant it as he chose. The suit reflected poorly on Carrouges at Argentan and deepened his estrangement from the count's circle.

Two years later Carrouges was again in court against Count Pierre, this time over lands administered by his recently deceased father. His father's death early in 1382 vacated the captaincy of the castle of Bellême, a post Carrouges believed was his by right; Pierre passed him over and gave it to another follower. Carrouges brought legal action and was again defeated. In March 1383 he attempted to buy the neighbouring fiefs of Cuigny and Plainville from Sir Jean de Vauloger. The sale required Count Pierre's approval as overlord of both fiefs; he refused it and required Carrouges to turn the properties over to him in exchange for a refund. Carrouges complied, and blamed Le Gris's influence for the outcome.

== Campaigning in Scotland ==
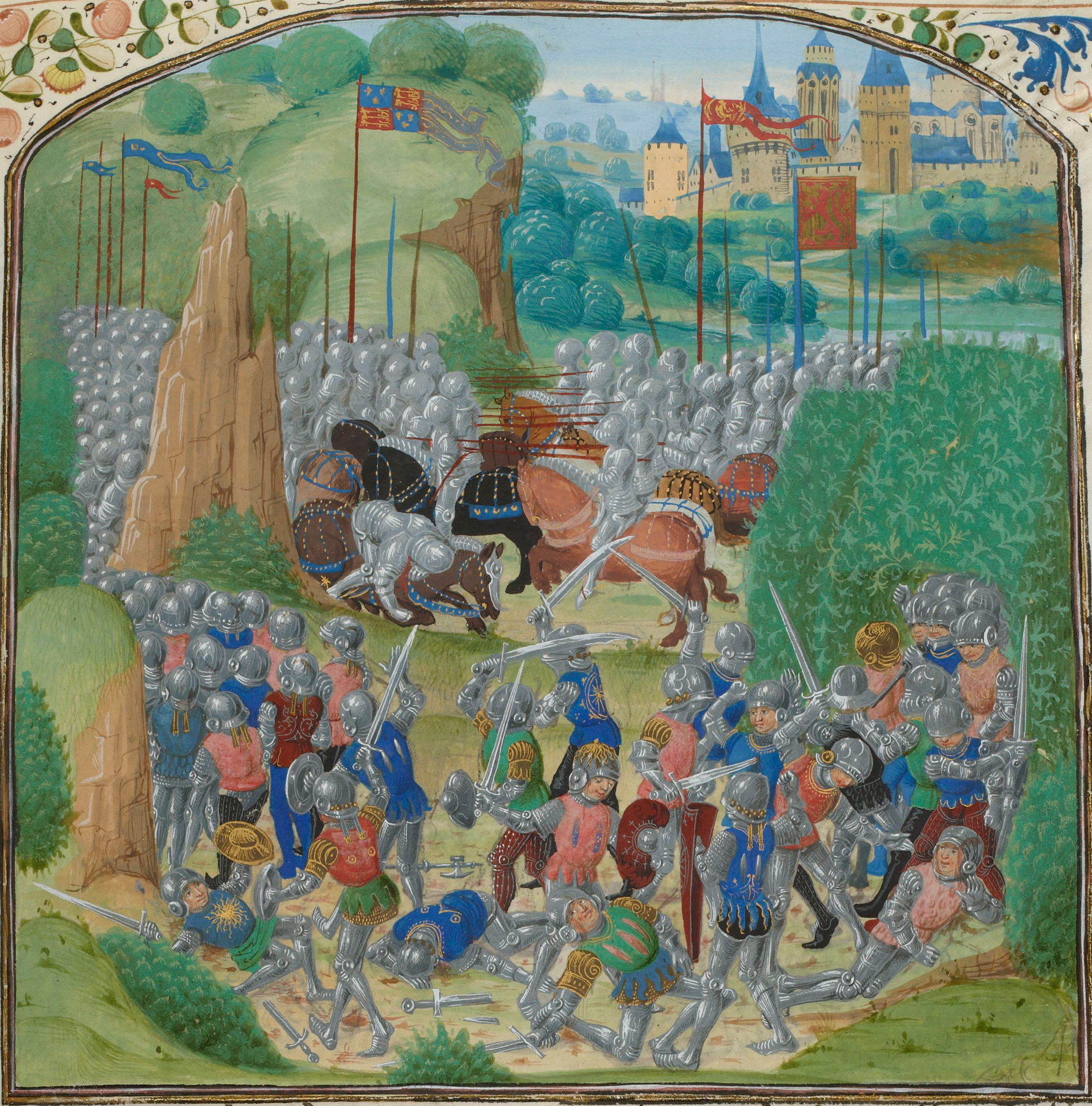
Medieval illumination depicting the Battle of Otterburn during border warfare between England and Scotland, from Jean Froissart's Chronicles

In 1385 the French government prepared a double invasion of England: an advance guard under Jean de Vienne, Admiral of France, was to sail for Scotland and raid northern England alongside the Scots, while a second force under the Constable, Olivier de Clisson, landed on the English south coast. Carrouges joined Vienne's force, hoping to repair his fortunes by military service.

The expedition had been intended to comprise 1,000 men-at-arms and 600 crossbowmen, but difficulty in levying crossbowmen produced a revised force of some 1,350 men-at-arms and only 300 crossbowmen. It mustered at Amiens in April and at Sluys early in May, sailed in 183 vessels, evaded the English fleet and landed at Leith, and possibly Dunbar, before the end of May. It carried horses, armour as gifts for the Scots, 50,000 francs in gold as a subsidy for Robert II and the Scottish nobility, and a train of mining equipment and artillery. A muster taken at Sluys on 8 May 1385 records "Jean de Carouges, escuier" present with nine squires under his command, in receipt of 320 livres, or half a livre per man per day.

An indenture sealed at Edinburgh on 1 July set out rules for joint operations — concentrating on logistics and on avoiding undue risk rather than on military objectives — and fixed the opening of the campaign for 23 July. The allies differed sharply over strategy. The French sought glory in open battle and wanted to attack the walled towns and castles of the border; the Scots preferred raiding and scorched earth, and were unwilling to accept the casualties and delays of siege warfare. The French were prevented, sometimes by violence, from living off the Scottish countryside, believed themselves overcharged for provisions, and regarded the country as a poverty-stricken backwater.

The Franco-Scottish force descended on the East March, the Scottish contingent led by James, Earl of Douglas, and captured and slighted the English border strongholds of Cornhill, Wark and Ford; Froissart claims the raiders reached as far south as Morpeth. They had withdrawn to Edinburgh by early August in the face of a large English invasion.

Richard II crossed the border on 6 August with the largest English army put into the field in the late fourteenth century: a near-contemporary order of battle gives some 14,000 men, while exchequer records show payments to retinues of more than 12,000. Marking his entry into Scotland at Hoselaw with the creation of two dukedoms, he burned Melrose and Dryburgh, reached Newbattle on 11 August and Edinburgh the following day, sparing Holyrood at the Duke of Lancaster's intercession. The Scots and French refused battle and fell back, wasting the country as they went; shortage of food contributed to a bitter quarrel between the king and Lancaster, and Richard was back at Newcastle by 19 August.

The allies retaliated on the West March, probably in late August or early September. (Note: MacDonald argues against the older view that this raid coincided with Richard II's invasion: the assault on Carlisle is firmly dated to 7 September, and the French army is recorded at Edinburgh on 3 and 15 August, which would leave too little time for a raid into Cumberland and back.) Vienne and the Earl of Douglas, joined by the lord of Galloway, rode into Cumberland, struck at Penrith and wasted the Eden valley. Whether Carlisle itself was assaulted is uncertain: Scottish accounts hold that an attack was considered but not made, while English sources describe a real assault beaten off, one chronicler crediting an apparition of the Virgin with terrifying the besiegers.

Moving north into the Middle March, where they were joined by Robert, Earl of Fife, the allies debated an assault on Roxburgh Castle. Vienne refused to risk French lives unless the castle, once taken, became the prize of Charles VI; no agreement could be reached and the attack was abandoned. MacDonald describes the dispute as the culmination of a series of frictions that had beset the joint venture. There is no record of further French involvement in the fighting of 1385. The French were at Perth by 3 October and embarked for home at the end of the month, though Vienne himself remained in Scotland until at least 16 November while the Scots pressed claims for compensation for damage done by his troops.

Carrouges had been knighted during the campaign, raising his social standing and his rate of pay, though he had lost five of his nine men-at-arms and much of his money.

== The accusation ==
In January 1386 Carrouges travelled to Paris to collect the wages owed him for the previous year's campaign. He disclosed his plans at Count Pierre's court at Argentan before setting out, and Le Gris learned from them that he would be away.

On the morning of 18 January 1386, Carrouges' mother, Nicole, left the family chateau at Capomesnil for Saint-Pierre-sur-Dives on legal business, apparently taking the household servants with her and leaving her daughter-in-law unattended. Marguerite later testified that a man-at-arms named Adam Louvel came to the door and, after raising a question about a loan, announced that Le Gris was outside and wished to see her. According to her account Le Gris then forced his way in, propositioned her, and raped her with Louvel's assistance, threatening her against telling anyone.

Marguerite said nothing for several days, until her husband returned on 21 or 22 January. Carrouges summoned his relatives and Marguerite's, and a council was convened at which she repeated her account.

Under the custom of Normandy, the rape of a married woman had to be prosecuted by her husband; that of a widow could be pursued by a male relative. Claims brought by unmarried women were treated with considerable scepticism, and whether a case could proceed to a wager of battle turned on the woman's admission and her reputation. Trial by battle in such cases was, as the historian Ariella Elema puts it, "reserved for defending the reputations of women who were considered respectable". Carrouges therefore brought the case in his own name.

He faced immediate difficulty, because Le Gris was a favourite of Count Pierre, who would sit as judge. The trial at Argentan was so one-sided that neither Carrouges nor his wife attended. Pierre acquitted Le Gris of all charges and suggested that Marguerite had dreamt the attack.

== Legal proceedings ==
Carrouges travelled to Paris to appeal to the king. Knowing that the case rested on his wife's testimony against Le Gris's denial, he sought a judicial duel rather than an ordinary criminal trial. Such trials were rare by 1386, and the Parlement granted them only where the conditions of a statute of 1306 were satisfied: the crime had to be a capital one, the truth had to be undeterminable by any other means, and the accused had to be, in the words of the Parlement's register, "publicly and notoriously defamed and suspected". Records of trial by battle in connection with rape are very rare; Elema identifies only three from the end of the fourteenth century, of which this is one.

On 9 July 1386 both men presented themselves before the Parlement of Paris at the Palais de Justice to issue the formal challenge, reciting their accusations and throwing down a gauntlet. The Parlement decided to hear the case first as an ordinary criminal matter and to defer its decision on the duel until both sides had given testimony. Le Gris, a cleric in minor orders, was entitled to demand trial in an ecclesiastical court, which would have excluded a duel; he declined to do so. He instead brought a counter-claim against Carrouges for the sum of 40,000 gold francs.

The criminal trial ran through the summer. Marguerite was by then visibly pregnant; medieval medical theory held that conception could not follow from rape, and her condition was therefore treated as bearing on the case. Adam Louvel and at least one maidservant gave evidence under torture, as was customary for people of low birth, and neither produced evidence incriminating Le Gris. Le Gris offered alibis and argued that he could not have covered the distance between them on the morning in question; Carrouges answered with a demonstration that the journey was possible. On 15 September, unable to determine the truth of the matter, the Parlement ordered that the two men fight a duel to the death.

== Trial by combat ==
The combat was set for 27 November 1386 and deferred by a month, to 29 December, so that Charles VI could return from Flanders in time to watch it. No established ground had been set aside for judicial duels, and a jousting arena at the Abbey of Saint-Martin-des-Champs north of the city was used.

The Carrouges–Le Gris duel was one of three fought in the closing months of 1386. In September, Gérard de Mortagne had faced Gilles, lord of Chin, before the Duke of Lorraine at Nancy, a combat the duke halted on the field; in December, Robert de Beaumanoir and Pierre Tournemine fought before the Duke of Brittany at Nantes on an appeal of murder, after which the defeated Tournemine was hanged. Elema suggests the parties may each have been aware of the other cases, and observes that by submitting their quarrels to arbitration they lent prestige to the princes who judged them.

Thousands of Parisians arrived at the abbey at dawn. Among the spectators were the king and his uncles John, Duke of Berry, Philip the Bold and Louis II, Duke of Bourbon, together with his brother the Duke of Orléans. Marguerite watched from a carriage overlooking the field, dressed in black. Both she and her husband stood to lose their lives by the outcome: had Carrouges yielded rather than been killed, he would have been hanged at Montfaucon as a proven liar, while under a custom still part of French law in the late fourteenth century a woman shown by a judicial duel to have sworn falsely in accusing a man of rape was to be burned alive.

The two men fought mounted and then on foot, in plate armour, with lance, longsword, axe and dagger. Le Gris was knighted before the combat so that the two would be of equal standing. In Jager's reconstruction, the combatants shattered their lances in successive charges, killed one another's horses with axes, and continued on foot until Carrouges was wounded in the thigh; he then brought Le Gris down, forced open his opponent's visor, demanded a confession, and — receiving instead a denial — killed him with a dagger thrust to the neck. (Note: The surviving accounts of the fight itself differ from one another, and modern reconstructions depend on choices between them. Elema notes Eric Jager's "struggles to reconcile conflicting versions of the famous duel" in the endnotes to his own chapter on the event, and observes more generally that chronicle descriptions of judicial combats were shaped by literary convention as much as by observation. Jager acknowledges having used his own invention to fill gaps in the sources.) Froissart's account is briefer, recording that Carrouges was wounded in the thigh, struck his adversary down and killed him with a sword thrust, and then asked the spectators whether he had done his duty.

Carrouges knelt before the king, who granted him a thousand francs and an income of two hundred francs a year. He and Marguerite rode in procession to Notre-Dame de Paris to give thanks. Parliament later awarded him a further six thousand livres and a position in the royal household. He renewed his claim to Aunou-le-Faucon, without success; Count Pierre never forgave him the death of his favourite.

== Royal service ==
Over the following three years Jean and Marguerite had two more children and divided their time between Paris and Normandy. In 1390 Carrouges was made a chevalier d'honneur, a bodyguard of the king. The following year he was sent to Hungary to assess the threat from the Ottoman Empire, second in command to Jean de Boucicaut, a Marshal of France.

In 1392 Charles VI raised an army against the Duke of Brittany, who had refused to surrender Pierre de Craon after Craon's attempt on the life of the Constable, Olivier de Clisson. Carrouges, newly appointed chevalier d'honneur, rode with the king's retinue that summer with ten squires of his own. On 5 August, as the army crossed a forest near Le Mans in great heat, a page dropped a lance against a helmet; at the sound the king drew his sword, struck out at those around him, killed several of his own attendants and set off in pursuit of his fleeing brother before being surrounded and disarmed. Jager notes that Carrouges was in the royal retinue and may have joined the pursuit.

=== Crusade of Nicopolis ===
In 1396 the French army mobilised against the Ottoman Turks as part of a new crusade. Having led the earlier mission to Hungary, Carrouges returned east in the service of his old commander Jean de Vienne. The crusading army crossed central Europe, joined the Hungarians and marched south along the Danube, arriving before Nicopolis on 12 September and settling into a siege.

The battle was fought on 25 September 1396. The French contingent formed only part of the Christian coalition, whose overall command lay with King Sigismund of Hungary, but the French insisted on leading the attack before the rest were ready and without properly reconnoitring the Ottoman positions; the charge was begun by Philip of Artois, Count of Eu, who accused the other commanders of cowardice when they urged him to wait. The French bore the brunt of the fighting and, in Sumption's assessment, "acquitted themselves with extraordinary courage and endurance" before being defeated by superior tactics, discipline and numbers. Survivors were ridden down by Turkish spahis, drowned in the Danube, or killed afterwards in the prisoners' pens.

Jean de Vienne was among the dead, killed with the banner of the Virgin still in his hand. What became of Carrouges is not known. Jager considers it most likely that he died fighting near where Vienne fell and was buried with him in a mass grave, but allows that he may instead have been among the several hundred prisoners beheaded the following day. His estates passed to his ten-year-old son Robert, and a mural of Jean and Marguerite was painted in the Abbey of St Étienne at Caen in his memory; both the family and the mural later faded into obscurity.

The Carrouges family was succeeded by that of Le Veneur de Tillières, who held the Château de Carrouges until 1936, when the last of the line ceded it to the state. The commune of Sainte-Marguerite-de-Carrouges takes its name from Marguerite de Carrouges.

== Legacy ==
The case was recorded soon after by Jean Froissart, and over the following century by Jean Juvénal des Ursins, the Grandes Chroniques de France and Jehan de Waurin, among others, many embellishing the story. Its documentary record is unusually full for a medieval trial: the registers of the Parlement de Paris survive, as do the notes kept by Le Gris's lawyer Jean Le Coq.

Several chronicles, including the Chronique du Religieux de Saint-Denys and that of Juvénal des Ursins, report that another man later confessed to the rape at his death. Jager considers this account to be without basis, and notes that a version of it survived in the Encyclopædia Britannica entry for "Duel" into the twentieth century.

The combat is often described as the last judicial duel fought in France, a description reviewers of Jager's book have called inaccurate. It was the last authorised by the Parlement of Paris, but not the last in the kingdom or in French-speaking lands. Elema records that there were "several last duels": in 1388, two Norman labourers were granted a day to fight over a similar accusation of rape before the bailli of Normandy, and were persuaded by friends to settle; a Savoyard case was fought at Bourg-en-Bresse in 1397; and a combat at Arras in 1431 was halted by the Duke of Burgundy before blood was drawn. The last French judicial combat approved by a court and actually fought was that between Jacotin Plouvier and Mahiot Coquel at Valenciennes in 1455. An ordinance of 1409 restricted wagers of battle to the king and the Parlement.

The case was discussed by Diderot in the Encyclopédie, by Voltaire in his Histoire du Parlement de Paris, and in a number of nineteenth-century works, including one by a descendant of Le Gris who sought to prove his ancestor's innocence. Eric Jager, a professor of English at UCLA, published a narrative account, The Last Duel, in 2004. It was adapted by Ben Affleck, Nicole Holofcener and Matt Damon into the 2021 film The Last Duel, directed by Ridley Scott, with Damon as Carrouges, Adam Driver as Le Gris and Jodie Comer as Marguerite.

== Sources ==
- Billings, Malcolm (1987). The Cross and the Crescent. BBC. ISBN 978-0-563-21282-9.
- Ditcham, Brian G. H. (January 2005). "Review of Eric Jager, The Last Duel". De Re Militari. Society for Medieval Military History.
- Elema, Ariella (2012). Trial by Battle in France and England (PhD). University of Toronto.
- Jager, Eric (2004). The Last Duel. Century. ISBN 978-0-7126-6190-4.
- MacDonald, Alastair J. (2000). Border Bloodshed: Scotland, England and France at War 1369–1403. East Linton: Tuckwell Press. ISBN 9781862321069.
- Sumption, Jonathan (2011) [2009]. Divided Houses. The Hundred Years War. Vol. III (ebook ed.). Faber & Faber. ISBN 9780571266562.

=== Primary sources ===
- "An Account of the Duel between Jean de Carrouges and Jacques le Gris in the Chronicle of the Monk of St. Denis". Chronique du Religieux de Saint-Denys, translated by Steven Muhlberger.
- "The life-and-death duel between Jacques le Gris and Jean de Carogne". Froissart's Chronicles, translated by Thomas Johnes.
