= The Last Duel (2021 film) =

2021 film by Ridley Scott

- Theatrical release poster
- Directed by: Ridley Scott
- Written by: Nicole Holofcener; Ben Affleck; Matt Damon
- Based on: The Last Duel: A True Story of Crime, Scandal, and Trial by Combat in Medieval France by Eric Jager
- Produced by: Ridley Scott; Kevin J. Walsh; Jennifer Fox; Nicole Holofcener; Matt Damon; Ben Affleck
- Starring: Matt Damon; Adam Driver; Jodie Comer; Ben Affleck
- Cinematography: Dariusz Wolski
- Edited by: Claire Simpson
- Music by: Harry Gregson-Williams
- Production companies: Scott Free Productions; Pearl Street Films
- Distributed by: 20th Century Studios
- Release dates: September 10, 2021 (Venice); October 15, 2021 (United Kingdom and United States)
- Running time: 153 minutes
- Countries: United Kingdom; United States
- Language: English
- Budget: $100 million
- Box office: $30.6 million

The Last Duel is a 2021 epic historical drama film directed by Ridley Scott from a screenplay by Nicole Holofcener, Ben Affleck, and Matt Damon, based on the 2004 book The Last Duel: A True Story of Crime, Scandal, and Trial by Combat in Medieval France by Eric Jager. Set in 14th century France, the film stars Damon as Jean de Carrouges, a knight who challenges his former friend, squire Jacques le Gris (Adam Driver), to a judicial duel after Jean's wife, Marguerite (Jodie Comer), accuses Jacques of raping her. The events leading up to the duel are divided into three distinct chapters, reflecting the contradictory perspectives of the three main characters. Affleck also stars in a supporting role as Count Pierre d'Alençon.

An adaptation of Jager's book was first announced in 2015, though it was not officially greenlit until July 2019. Affleck and Damon were confirmed as stars and co-writers that month, with Comer and Driver joining the cast later that year. Filming took place in France and Ireland from February to October 2020, with a hiatus of several months due to the COVID-19 pandemic.

The Last Duel premiered at the 78th Venice International Film Festival on September 10, 2021, and was theatrically released in the United States on October 15, 2021, by 20th Century Studios. The film received generally positive reviews from critics, and was selected by the National Board of Review as one of the top ten films of 2021. Although the film was a box-office bomb, it later found financial success in post-theatrical markets.

== Plot ==
While the plot of the film is portrayed in three separate chapters, each telling the same story from the perspective of the three main characters, the following description summarizes all three presentations into a single narrative:

After serving in the Caroline War, French squire Jean de Carrouges and his comrade Jacques le Gris swear allegiance to Count Pierre d'Alençon, who has been named Jean's overlord by King Charles VI. To improve his finances, Jean marries Marguerite de Thibouville on the promise of a large dowry from her father Robert that includes the rights to many valuable estates. Pierre, however, seizes the prized estate of Aunou-le-Faucon to settle Robert's back taxes and gifts it to Jacques, who has become one of Pierre's favorites. Jean appeals to King Charles, but the king upholds Pierre's decision, and the count exacts revenge by depriving Jean of a prominent captaincy previously held by his late father and gifting it to Jacques, making him superior to Jean in rank.

Jean's marriage becomes strained due to the couple's failure to conceive. He and Jacques reconcile at a celebration, where Jacques becomes smitten with Marguerite after she befriends him in an attempt to win favor. Jacques misinterprets this as a reciprocation of his affections, coming to believe she actually does not love Jean.

Following his participation in a failed military campaign in Scotland that sees him knighted but still bankrupt, Jean sets off for Paris to collect his promised rewards. Marguerite demonstrates a talent for managing the estate in his absence; while collecting taxes from her peasants, she also learns Jean regularly defers the poorest from their obligation. One day, when Marguerite is left alone at the chateau, Jacques visits and tricks his way in, haughtily proclaiming his love. Marguerite rejects his advances and attempts to flee, but he chases her to her room and rapes her before ordering her not to tell her husband. Upon Jean's return, Marguerite tells him of the assault; after questioning whether she is telling the truth, Jean becomes convinced that Jacques raped Marguerite to insult him specifically. Jean insists that Marguerite immediately have sex with him so that Jacques will not be "the last man that knew her."

Pierre informs Jacques that Jean is accusing him of raping Marguerite, which he denies. Despite the count's attempt to exert his authority, Jean appeals his case directly to King Charles and requests a duel to the death. Jacques accepts, having decided not to seek a favorable forum of a Catholic ecclesiastical court. Marguerite's friends abandon her, believing her to be lying to cover up an affair, while Jean's mother, who was also raped as a youth but never revealed the truth, insists Marguerite drop her accusations. At Jacques' trial six months later, a now-pregnant Marguerite remains resolute that she is telling the truth, while the court implies that Jacques is the father of her child. Charles grants Jean's request for a duel to determine the case. Marguerite is also informed that she will be burned alive for perjury if her husband loses and confronts Jean for not telling her about this. She gives birth to her son not long before the duel takes place.

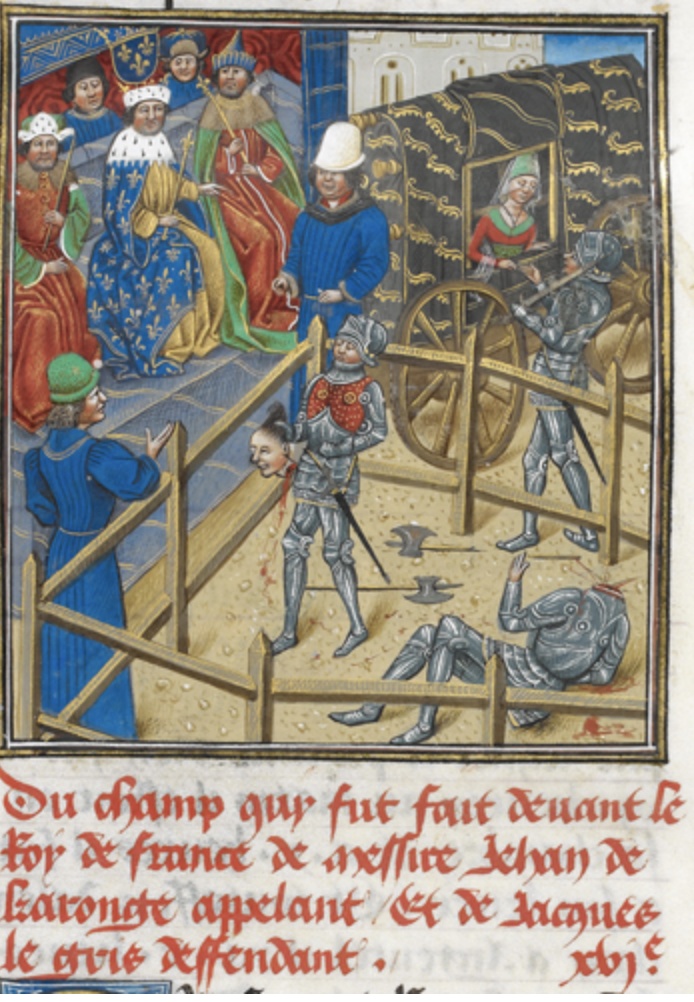
A historic depiction of the duel (1480)

The duel begins with Jean and Jacques jousting until both men lose their mounts and fight hand-to-hand. Following a lengthy struggle, Jean is stabbed in the thigh but eventually manages to pin down Jacques. He demands that Jacques confess or face damnation, but Jacques claims his innocence. Jean then kills him. Jean basks in the glory of his victory while Marguerite follows quietly behind. Meanwhile, Jacques' body is stripped and hung upside down publicly whilst Pierre looks on.

An epilogue reveals Jean died fighting in the Crusades while Marguerite continued managing his estate, living in peace for the remainder of her life but never remarrying.

== Cast ==
- Matt Damon as Sir Jean de Carrouges
- Adam Driver as Jacques le Gris
- Jodie Comer as Marguerite de Carrouges
- Ben Affleck as Count Pierre d'Alençon
- Harriet Walter as Nicole de Buchard
- Alex Lawther as King Charles VI
- Serena Kennedy as Queen Isabeau
- Marton Csokas as Crespin
- Željko Ivanek as Le Coq
- Tallulah Haddon as Marie
- Bryony Hannah as Alice
- Nathaniel Parker as Sir Robert de Thibouville
- Sam Hazeldine as Thomin du Bois
- Michael McElhatton as Bernard Latour
- Oliver Cotton as Jean de Carrouges III
- Clive Russell as King's Uncle
- Adam Nagaitis as Adam Louvel
- Bosco Hogan as Priest
- Clare Dunne as Ceila
- Caoimhe O'Malley as Elizabeth

== Production ==
=== Development ===
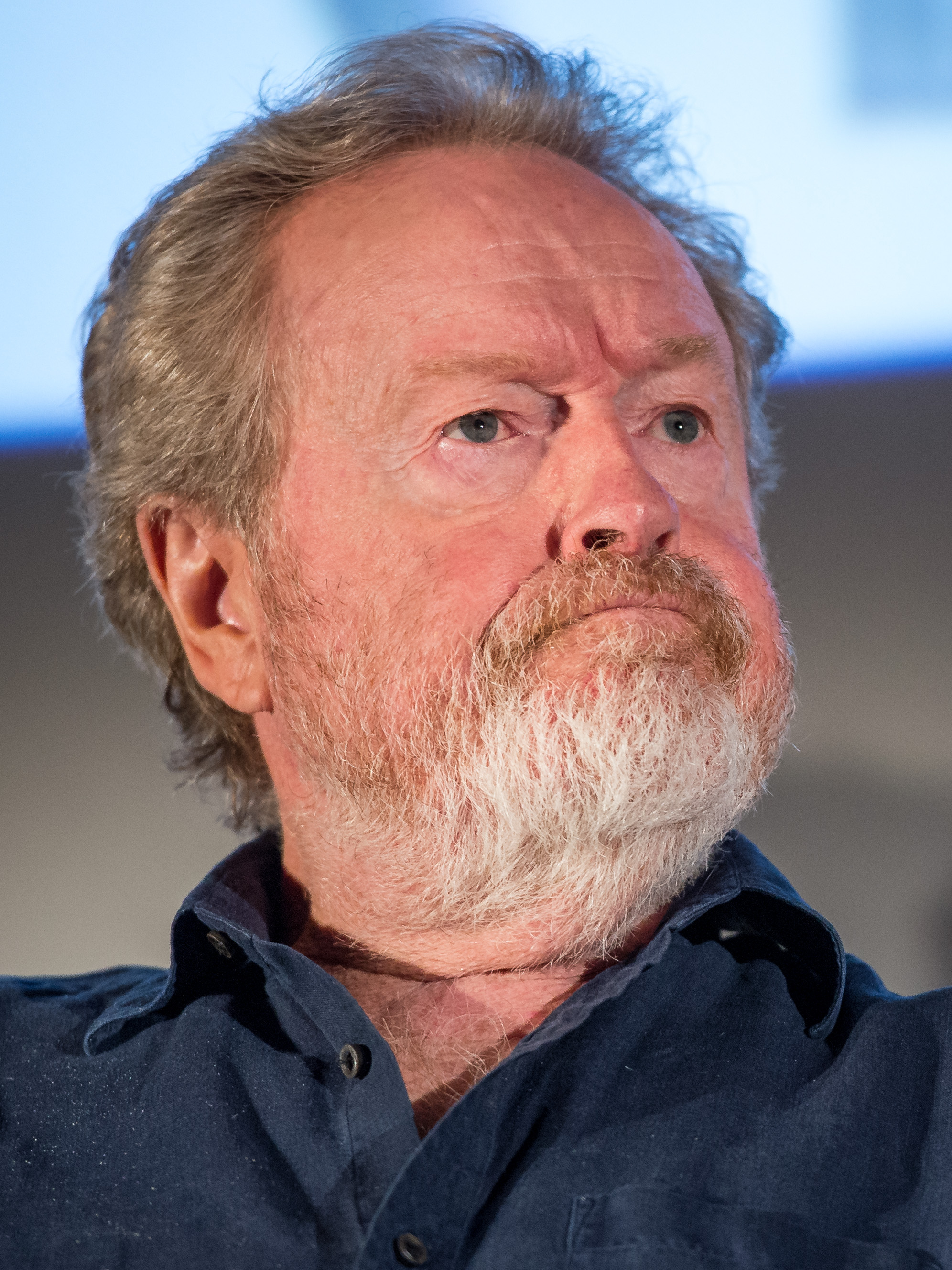
Director Scott in 2015

The project was initially announced in July 2015, with Francis Lawrence planning to direct the film, and Shaun Grant writing the screenplay. No further development was announced, and the film rights lapsed. In July 2019, Deadline Hollywood announced that Ridley Scott was planning to direct the film, with Ben Affleck and Matt Damon set to star as well as write the screenplay with Nicole Holofcener. With Walt Disney Studios holding the rights to the film as a result of the Disney–Fox merger, it was unknown if the company would produce the film owing to its subject matter; however, Deadline Hollywood added that "every studio in town was waiting in the wings" should Disney sell the rights. In September, Jodie Comer entered negotiations to join the cast and was confirmed the following month, with Adam Driver entering negotiations to join the film after Affleck opted to play a different supporting role. Driver was confirmed in November, with Disney stating it would distribute the film by setting a release date. Harriet Walter was added to the cast in February 2020. Dr. Lorris Chevalier, at the time a PhD student and curator in Berze castle, joined the project as the historical advisor.

=== Filming ===
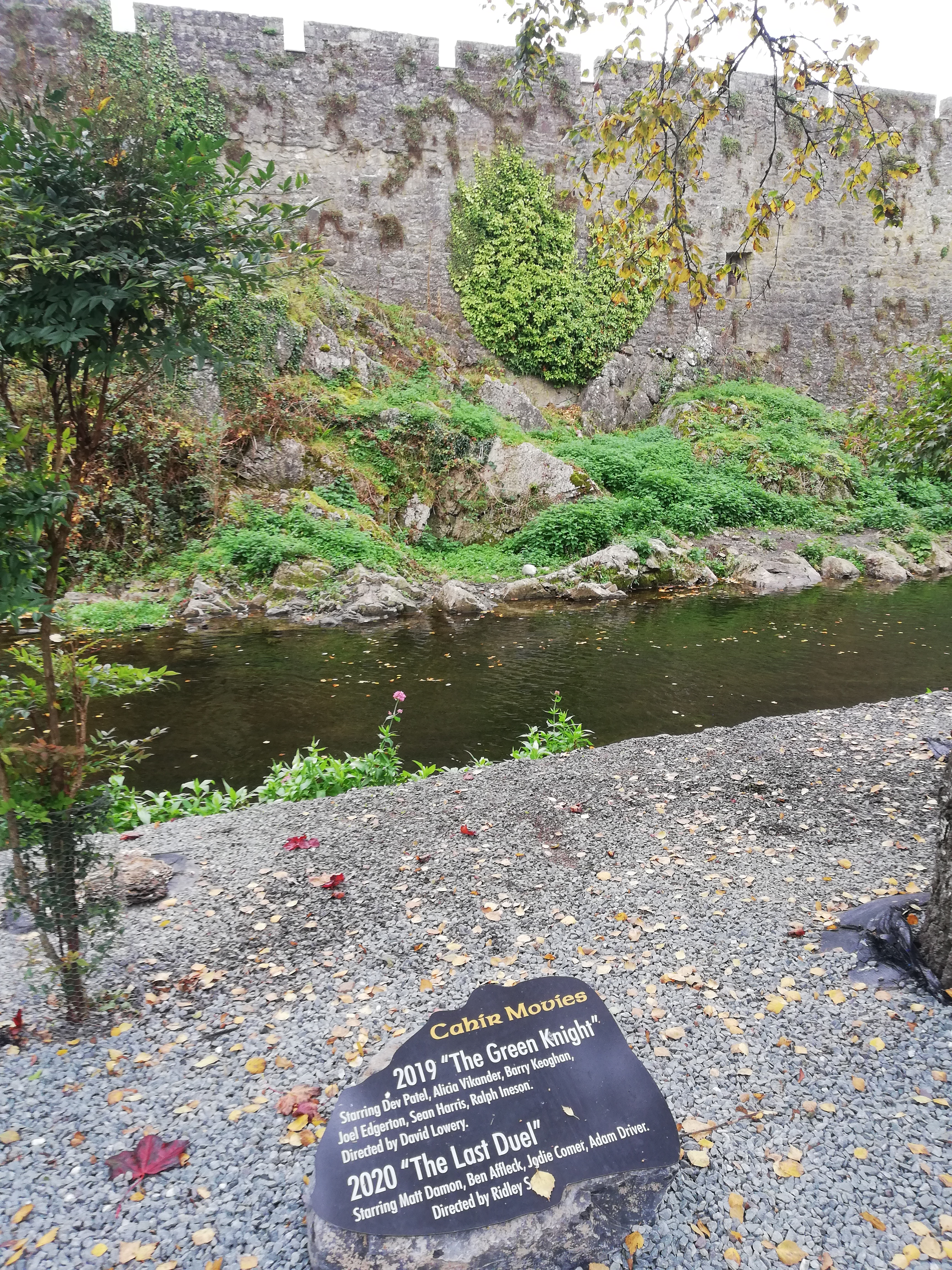
Plaque at Cahir Castle, Ireland, commemorating its use as a filming location for The Last Duel

Filming began on February 14, 2020, in Dordogne, France and continued until March 12, 2020, in the medieval castle of Berzé-le-Châtel (near Mâcon), Burgundy, France (with a film crew of 300 people including 100 extras). Several scenes were also shot at the 11th-century Cistercian Abbaye de Fontfroide in Narbonne, Aude, France. Filming was to have taken place in Ireland, using locations at Bective Abbey, County Meath and Cahir Castle, County Tipperary and various locations across Dublin and County Wicklow from March 23, 2020, to March 30, 2020. On March 13, 2020, Disney announced that the studio had to delay the shoot indefinitely amid concerns for the cast and crew in light of the COVID-19 pandemic as well as travel restrictions in Europe. Filming resumed in late September 2020 and production concluded in Ireland on October 14, 2020.

=== Music ===
Harry Gregson-Williams composed the film score, in his third collaboration with Scott as a composer after Kingdom of Heaven (2005) and The Martian (2015). The score was released by Hollywood Records on October 15, 2021, which consisted of vocal elements, from the British a cappella group Voces8 led by Grace Davidson (who performed one of the tracks) as well as orchestral elements, with the use of medieval and contemporary instrumentation indicated to highlight the three main characters and the events that led to the titular duel.

== Release ==
The Last Duel was originally scheduled to begin a limited theatrical release on December 25, 2020, before its wide release on January 8, 2021. As a result of the COVID-19 pandemic, the release date was pushed back a year to October 15, 2021. It had its world premiere at the 78th Venice International Film Festival on September 10, 2021. The film played exclusively in theaters for 45 days before it headed to digital platforms.

=== Home media ===
The Last Duel was released on digital platforms and premium video-on-demand on November 30, 2021, and on Blu-ray, DVD and Ultra HD Blu-ray on December 14, 2021, by Walt Disney Studios Home Entertainment. The film was subsequently made available for streaming on HBO Max on January 14, 2022.

On physical media, The Last Duel ranked tenth on the Blu-ray Disc chart and twenty-second on the overall disc sales chart for the week December 18, according to Circana's VideoScan tracking service, which compiles DVD and Blu-ray sales. On Fandango at Home's weekly digital sales and rental chart, The Last Duel placed ninth for the week ending December 19, following its premium digital release on November 30, 2021. The following week, ending January 2, 2022, the film ranked eighth. The film subsequently moved to fifth place for the week ending January 9.

JustWatch, a guide to streaming content with access to data from more than 20 million users around the world, reported that The Last Duel was the second most-streamed film in the United States for the week ending January 16, 2022.

== Reception ==
=== Box office ===
The Last Duel grossed $10.9 million in the United States and Canada and $19.7 million in other territories, for a worldwide total of $30.6 million.

In the United States and Canada, The Last Duel was initially projected to gross around $10 million from 3,065 theaters in its opening weekend. After making $1.8 million on its first day, including $350,000 from Thursday night previews, estimates were lowered to $5 million. It ended up debuting to $4.8 million, finishing fifth at the box office and marking the worst opening of Scott's career. Deadline Hollywood attributed the underperformance to the two-and-a-half-hour runtime limiting the number of showings, the subject matter being hard to market, the 45+ age demo not fully returning to theaters yet, and competition from Halloween Kills and No Time to Die. Several publications labeled the film a box-office bomb, and noted that 20th Century would likely lose millions on it. It fell 55% in its second weekend to $2.1 million, falling to seventh. The third weekend saw a drop of 78% to $558,000, for a domestic gross of around $10 million.

During an interview on the podcast WTF with Marc Maron in November 2021, Scott blamed the film's box-office failure on millennials, saying: "I think what it boils down to — what we've got today [are] the audiences who were brought up on these fucking cell phones. The millennian do not ever want to be taught anything unless you are told it on the cell phone". Ben Affleck, who co-wrote the film with co-lead Matt Damon and Nicole Holofcener, was more measured in his assessment of the film's financial failure:

I've had bad movies that didn't work and I didn't blink. I know why people didn't go–because they weren't good. But I liked what we did. I like what we had to say. I'm really proud of it. So I was really confused. And then to see that it did well on streaming, I thought, "Well, there you go. That's where the audience is."

=== Critical response ===
On the review aggregator website Rotten Tomatoes, 85% of 287 critics' reviews are positive, with an average rating of 7.3/10. The website's critics consensus reads: "The Last Duel's critique of systemic misogyny isn't as effective as it might have been, but it remains a well-acted and thought-provoking drama infused with epic grandeur." On Metacritic, the film has a weighted average score of 67 out of 100 based on 50 critics, indicating "generally favorable" reviews. Audiences polled by CinemaScore gave the film an average grade of "B+" on an A+ to F scale, while those at PostTrak gave it a 72% positive score.

Owen Gleiberman of Variety considered the film "intriguing but overcooked", writing: "Despite a brief action interlude here or there, The Last Duel turns out to be a lavishly convoluted and, at times, rather interesting medieval soap opera." Reviewing the film for TheWrap, Asher Luberto praised the performances and cinematography while criticizing the screenplay, writing: "Adapting Eric Jager's 2004 non-fiction book with screenwriters Matt Damon, Ben Affleck and Nicole Holofcener, Scott spins a medieval yarn that is by turns gruesome, grotesque, gorgeous and inconsistent."

Ben Croll of IndieWire, who gave the film a "B+" grade, praised it as "something all too rare on the current Hollywood field of battle: an intelligent and genuinely daring big budget melee that is — above all else — the product of recognizable artistic collaboration." Kyle Smith of National Review wrote that the film was "absolutely soaked in fascinating strangeness", adding: "It works because it doesn’t try to retrofit the facts of the past to fit the assumptions of the present."

Linda Marric of The Jewish Chronicle gave the film a score of five out of five stars, describing it as "a true return to form for Scott and a brilliant testament to Affleck and Damon's unparalleled screenwriting expertise." Deborah Ross of The Spectator described the film as "bleak, brutal and bloody with little respite – aside from Affleck's Count Pierre, who is nicely bitchy." Kevin Maher of The Times gave the film a score of four out of five, describing it as "a medieval epic that is perhaps [Scott's] most modern movie yet".

Reviewers from NPR's Fresh Air, The Atlantic, The A.V. Club, and CNN all compared The Last Duel to Akira Kurosawa's film Rashomon (1950). Mark Kermode of The Observer gave the film a score of three out of five stars, saying that it "plays like an armour-clad reimagining of Rashomon crossed with a #MeToo-inflected remake of Straw Dogs." He added that the film "has a tendency to mirror its central battle's attempts to address complex issues with the blunt tool of rabble-rousing spectacle."

Charlotte O'Sullivan of the Evening Standard gave the film three out of five stars, describing it as "a handsome, well-researched drama that's by turns earnest, amusing and unintentionally funny." Joe Morgenstern of The Wall Street Journal praised the film's production values, performances and primary theme, but wrote: "the narrative is cluttered with court intrigue against a background of repetitive battles, and the storytelling structure is exhausting." Brian Lowry of CNN wrote that the film "is muddy, bloody and grim but too drawn out in filtering 14th-century feudal norms through a modern prism." David Fear of Rolling Stone said that the film "ends up perching so close to parody at times that you'd swear the full title was Monty Python's The Last Duel."

=== Accolades ===
Year	Award	Category	Nominee(s)	Result	Ref.
2021	Camerimage	Golden Frog	The Last Duel	Nominated	
2021	Hollywood Music in Media Awards	Best Original Score in a Feature Film	Harry Gregson-Williams	Nominated	
2021	National Board of Review Awards	Top Ten Films (shared)	The Last Duel	Nominated	
2021	St. Louis Film Critics Association Awards	Best Supporting Actor	Ben Affleck	Nominated	
2022	Austin Film Critics Association Awards	Best Editing	Claire Simpson	Nominated	
2022	Critics' Choice Super Awards	Best Action Movie	The Last Duel	Nominated	
2022	Critics' Choice Super Awards	Best Villain in a Movie	Ben Affleck	Nominated	
2022	Critics' Choice Super Awards	Best Actress in an Action Movie	Jodie Comer	Won	
2022	Golden Raspberry Awards	Worst Supporting Actor	Ben Affleck	Nominated	
2022	Greater Western New York Film Critics Association	Best Picture	The Last Duel	Nominated	
2022	Greater Western New York Film Critics Association	Best Director	Ridley Scott	Nominated	
2022	Greater Western New York Film Critics Association	Best Lead Actress	Jodie Comer	Nominated	
2022	Greater Western New York Film Critics Association	Best Adapted Screenplay	Ben Affleck, Matt Damon, and Nicole Holofcener	Nominated	
2022	Greater Western New York Film Critics Association	Best Editing	Claire Simpson	Nominated	
2022	Satellite Awards	Best Original Score	Harry Gregson-Williams	Nominated	
2022	Satellite Awards	Best Sound	Daniel Birch, Stéphane Bucher, David Giammarco, Paul Massey, William Miller and Oliver Tarney	Nominated	
2022	Visual Effects Society Awards	Outstanding Supporting Visual Effects in a Photoreal Feature	Gary Brozenich, Helen Judd, Jessica Norman, Yann Blondel and Stefano Pepin	Nominated	
