= Aunou-le-Faucon =

- Commune
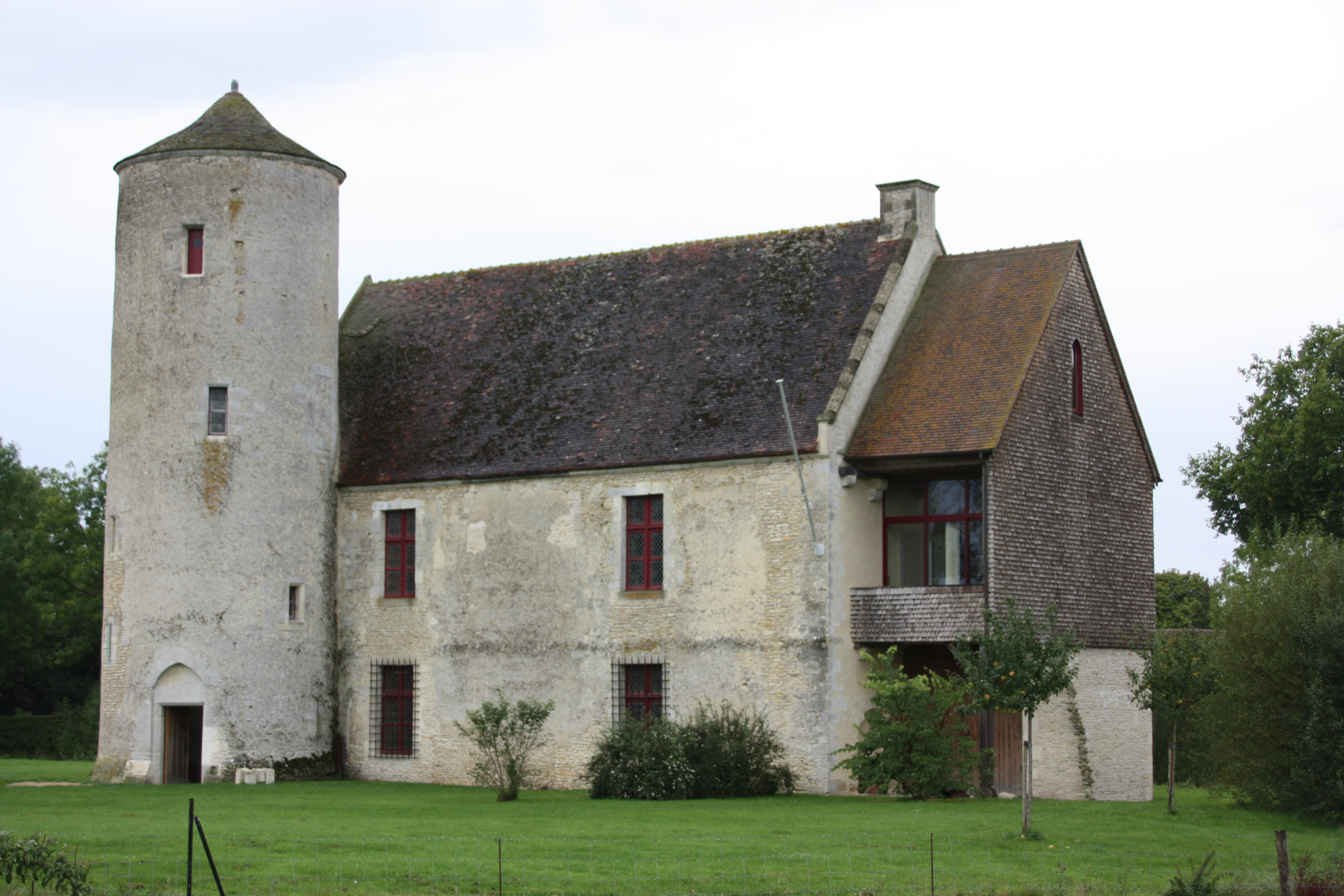
- The English Tower in Aunou-le-Faucon
- Location of Aunou-le-Faucon
- Location within France Location within Normandy
- Coordinates: 48°43′50″N 0°02′25″E
- Country: France
- Region: Normandy
- Department: Orne
- Arrondissement: Argentan
- Canton: Argentan-1
- Intercommunality: Terres d'Argentan Interco

Government
  - Mayor (2020–2026): Cécile Dupont
- Area^{1}: 6.69 km^{2} (2.58 sq mi)
- Elevation: 160 m (520 ft)
- Highest elevation: 200 m (660 ft)
- Lowest elevation: 154 m (505 ft)
- Population (2023): 246
  - Density: 36.8/km^{2} (95.2/sq mi)
- Time zone: UTC+01:00 (CET)
  - Summer (DST): UTC+02:00 (CEST)
- INSEE/Postal code: 61014 /61200
- ^{1} French Land Register data, which excludes lakes, ponds, glaciers > 1 km^{2} (0.386 sq mi or 247 acres) and river estuaries.

Aunou-le-Faucon (French pronunciation: [onu lə fokɔ̃]) is a commune in the Orne department of Normandy in northwestern France.

== Geography ==
The commune of is made up of the following villages and hamlets, Le Port d'Aunou, Le Moulin, Le Monthart and Aunou-le-Faucon.

Aunou-le-Faucon along with another 65 communes is part of a 20,593 hectare, Natura 2000 conservation area, called the Haute vallée de l'Orne et affluents.

Aunou-le-Faucon has 3 water courses running through it, the Orne plus two streams the Noës and Rogneux.

== Population ==
Historical population
Year	Pop.	±% p.a.
1968	206	—
1975	192	−1.00%
1982	208	+1.15%
1990	260	+2.83%
1999	243	−0.75%
2007	264	+1.04%
2012	238	−2.05%
2017	246	+0.66%
2023	246	+0.00%
Source: INSEE

== Places of interest ==
=== National heritage sites ===
Tour aux Anglais – a 14th-century building listed as a Monument historique in 1981

== In popular culture ==
Aunou-le-Faucon featured as a fief - originally owned by Robert de Thibouville, the father of Marguerite de Carrouges - at the center of a dispute between Jean de Carrouges, the husband of Marguerite, and Jacques le Gris, the favorite of their liege-lord, Peter II, Count of Alençon, in the 2021 film The Last Duel, directed by Ridley Scott.

== See also ==
- Communes of the Orne department
