= Saint-Martin-des-Champs Priory =

Priory in Paris, France

Coordinates: 48°51′58″N 2°21′17″E

The Priory of Saint-Martin-des-Champs was an influential monastery established in what is now the city of Paris, France. Its surviving buildings are considered treasures of Medieval architecture in the city.

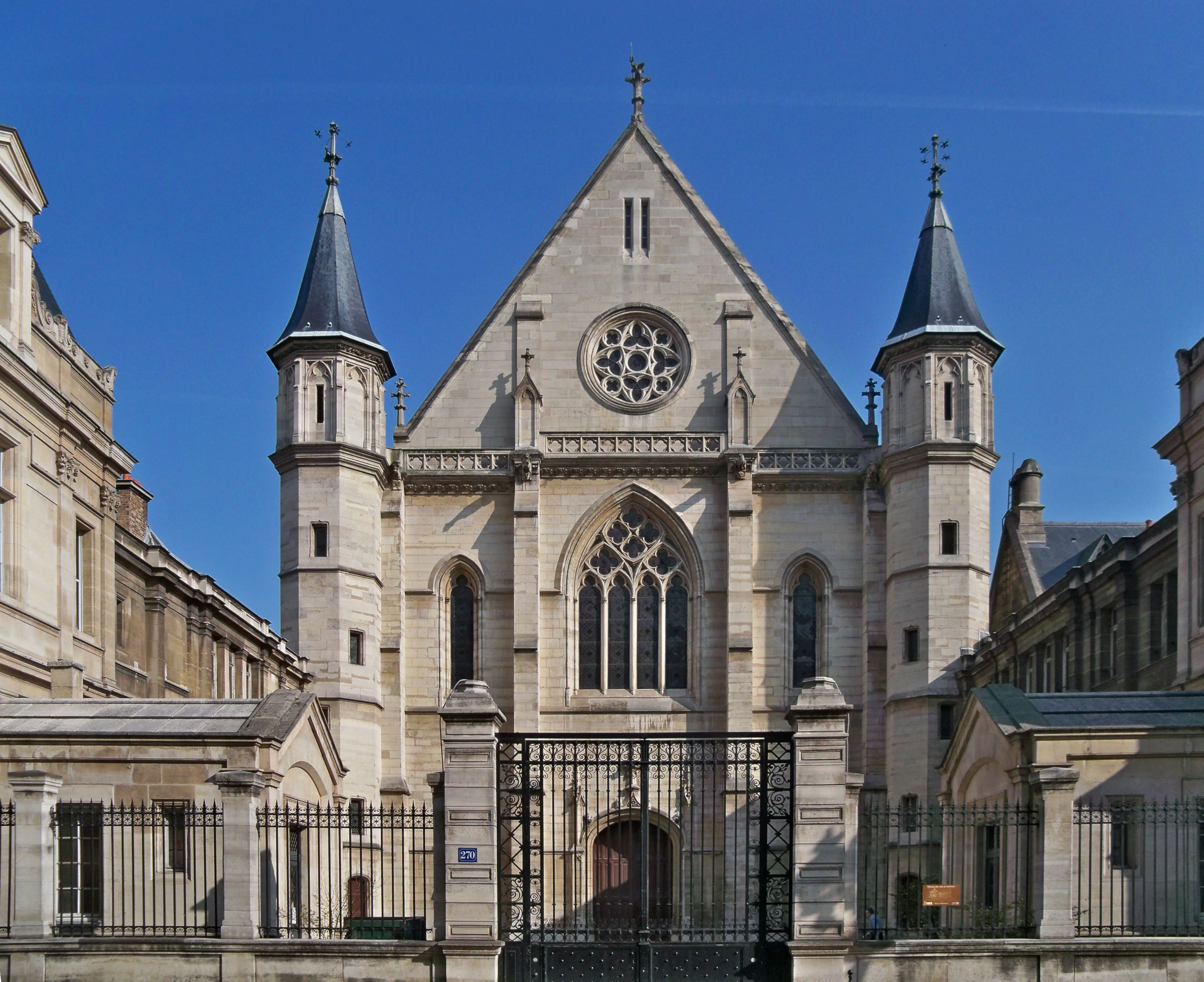
Musée des Arts et Métiers

== History ==
=== Foundations ===
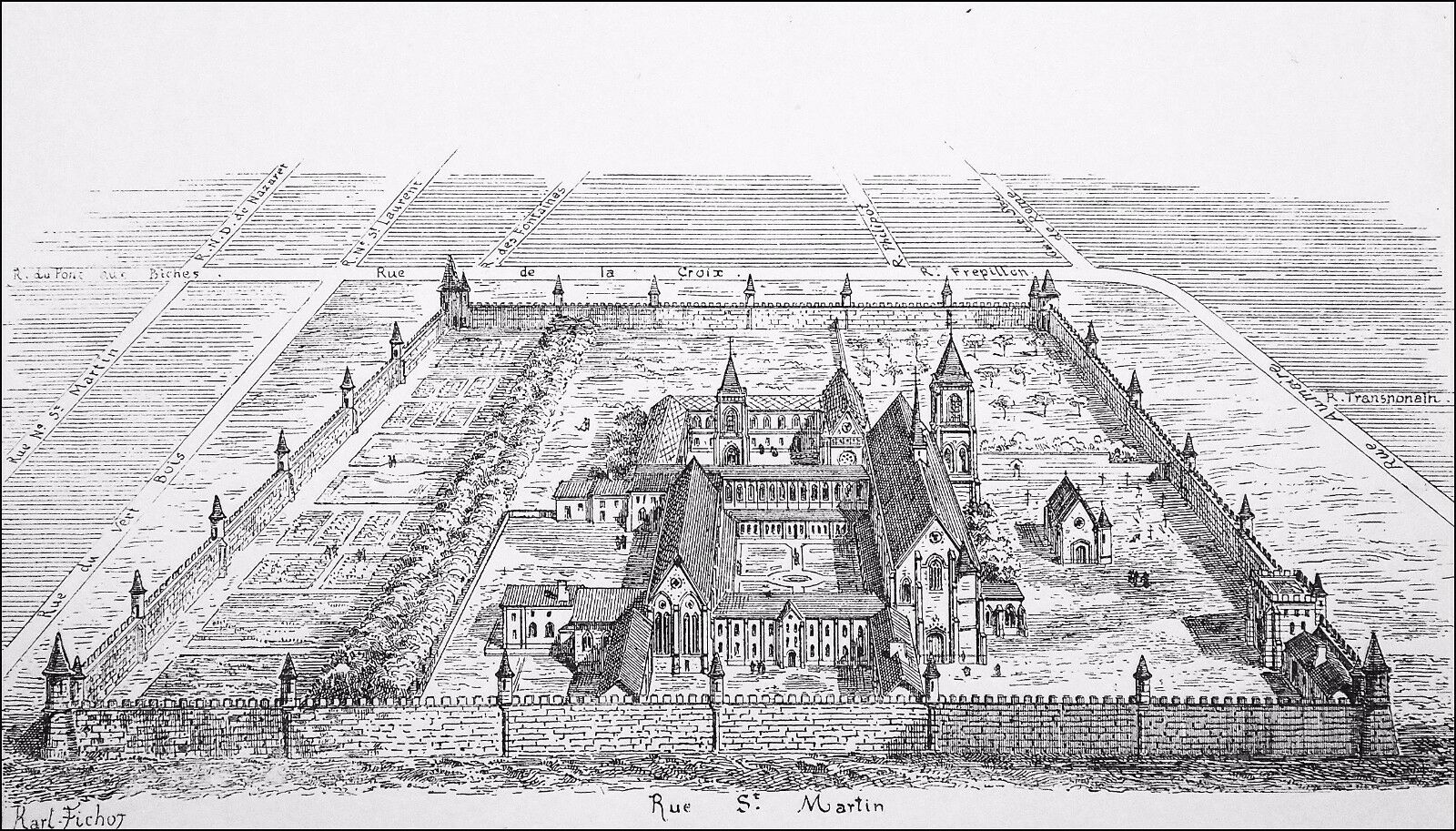
The Priory.

The oldest known structure on the site was a chapel dedicated to St. Martin of Tours, founded during the Merovingian dynasty, which appears in a text of 710. At a date which remains unknown, a community of monks became established there around the chapel. The abbey they founded was pillaged and destroyed by Norman invaders during the late 10th century.

In 1060, King Henry I of France chose to rebuild the complex of the former abbey, intending it then to be a priory of canons regular. At that era, it still remained outside the walls of the city, thus its designation as des champs (in the fields). In 1079 the priory was given to St. Hugh of Cluny and became a Benedictine community, which developed into one of the major houses of the Congregation of Cluny, The priory soon gained major landholdings throughout the region, becoming second in importance only to the Royal Abbey of St-Denis.

The priory church was completed in 1135, having a choir section with a double ambulatory, topped by a simple ribbed arch. The nave was completed during the 13th century, as was the refectory of the priory. The later two are attributed to Pierre de Montreuil. These are the only surviving portions of the monastic complex today.

The priory maintained a major presence in the religious and social life of Paris. It became the site of the last officially sanctioned trial by combat in France in 1386, when both the king and the Parliament of Paris authorized such a contest between the knights Jean de Carrouges and Jacques Le Gris, when the former charged the latter with raping his wife.

=== Decline ===
Over time, the priory fell subject to the system of commendatory abbots and became the property of a number of titular priors. The famous Cardinal Richelieu can be counted among their number.

The priory was suppressed in 1790 under the new laws of the French Revolution, and the buildings were used as a prison. The monastic walls and dormitories were soon torn down.

== Legacy ==
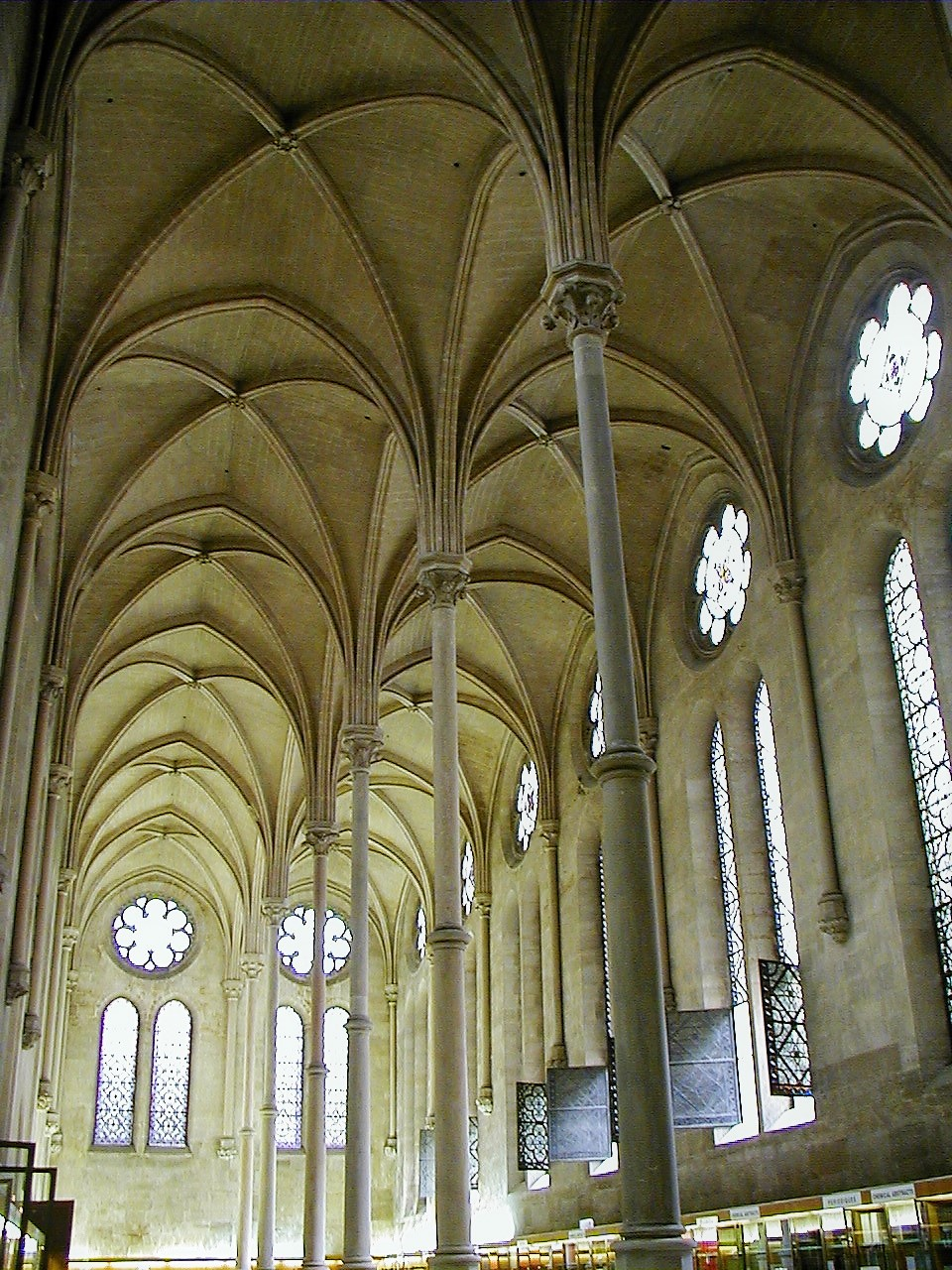
The former refectory of the priory, now used as the CNAM library.

The surviving structures of the priory became the home of the National Conservatory of Arts and Crafts (CNAM) and its Museum, which opened in 1802. The original Foucault Pendulum was housed there from 1855 until it was irreparably damaged in 2010.

== See also ==
- French Gothic architecture
- French Romanesque architecture
