= The Last Duel: A True Story of Crime, Scandal, and Trial by Combat in Medieval France =

2004 book by Eric Jager

- Author: Eric Jager
- Language: English
- Genre: History
- Publication date: 2004

The Last Duel: A True Story of Crime, Scandal, and Trial by Combat in Medieval France is a 2004 narrative history book by American author Eric Jager. The book examines one of the last officially sanctioned judicial duels in the history of France, fought in 1386 between the Norman knight Jean de Carrouges and the squire Jacques le Gris. The combat was ordered by the Parlement of Paris after Carrouges accused le Gris of raping his wife, Marguerite de Carrouges (née de Thibouville), in a case that drew widespread public attention and highlighted tensions surrounding honour, legal procedure, and the status of women in late medieval society. Jager situates the duel within the broader political, legal, and cultural landscape of fourteenth-century France, exploring the decline of trial by combat as a judicial practice while reconstructing the lives of the individuals involved. Drawing upon court records, chronicles, and other historical sources, the book presents the case as both a dramatic personal conflict and a reflection of shifting attitudes toward evidence, justice, and authority on the eve of the early modern period.

== Summary ==
The book begins with a depiction of the 29 December 1386 trial by combat (duel) in which the Norman knight Jean de Carrouges dueled Jacques le Gris, at the time a squire. Carrouges had accused Le Gris of the rape of his wife, Marguerite de Carrouges, née de Thibouville, some months before. He had gone to King Charles VI, seeking an appeal to the decision handed down by Count Pierre d'Alençon, who Carrouges believed favoured Le Gris. Whichever combatant was still alive at the end of the duel would be declared the winner, as a sign of God's will. If Jean de Carrouges had lost the duel, his wife would have been burned at the stake, as punishment for her false accusation.

In the centuries since Le Gris's death, the case has become an important cultural legend in France, and the guilt or innocence of its participants has been a source of great debate among historians and jurists.

Though this was the final judicial duel held in France, it was not the last legal duel. Subsequently authorised duels were not judicial duels deciding the guilt and innocence of the participants, but duels for honour to avenge an affront.

The last duel to be publicly authorised took place on 10 July 1547 at the castle of Saint-Germain-en-Laye: it opposed Guy Chabot de Jarnac against François de Vivonne, following a request by Jarnac to King Henry II for permission to duel to regain his honour. Jarnac went on to win the duel after injuring Vivonne. Vivonne later died of the sword wounds inflicted by Jarnac during the duel.

== Adaptations ==
An abridged version of the book was read by Robert Glenister on BBC Radio 4 as Book of the Week between Monday 10 and Friday 14 January 2005.

The Last Duel, a drama documentary based on the book and including comments by Jager, was broadcast by BBC Four as part of a medieval-themed season on 24 April 2008.

In 2021, director Ridley Scott adapted the book into a film of the same name, starring Matt Damon and Jodie Comer as Jean and Marguerite de Carrouges, Adam Driver as Le Gris and Ben Affleck as d'Alençon.
