= Marguerite de Carrouges =

French noblewoman

Marguerite de Carrouges (née de Thibouville; 1362, Château de Fontaine-la-Soret (Eure) – c. 1419) was a French noblewoman.

== Biography ==
=== Marriage ===
Marguerite married Jean de Carrouges in 1380.

=== Rape, trial and duel ===
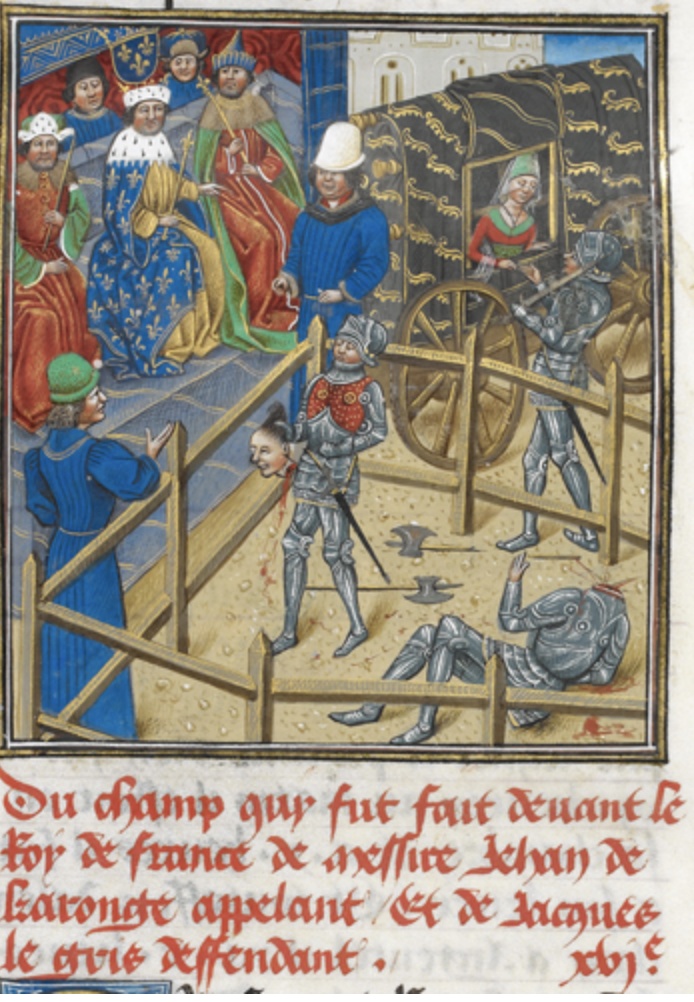
Duel between Jacques Le Gris and Jean de Carrouges

On 18 January 1386, Marguerite was allegedly raped by Jacques le Gris, a friend-turned-rival of Jean de Carrouges, in her mother-in-law's home in Capomesnil, Normandy. It is believed that le Gris persuaded Marguerite, whom he had previously been introduced to by her husband, to allow him into the Chateau. He then proceeded to make sexual advances, and when she did not reciprocate, he raped her with the help of his assistant Adam Louvel.

When Marguerite told Jean that she had been raped, a major concern for her would likely have been Carrouges accusing her of adultery. Adultery during the Middle Ages was not taken lightly; law required husbands who committed adultery to pay a fine and reconcile with their wives, while wives who committed adultery could be privately chastised but then had to be forgiven. Marguerite claimed that she did not commit adultery, but if Jean did not believe her, she would have been chastised, and it would not look good for the Carrouges family.

The Carrouges' initially took the matter up with their liege lord, Count d'Alençon, however, he was known to greatly favor le Gris and quickly threw the case out. Not willing to give up quite yet, Jean de Carrouges instead petitioned the French Parliament in Paris, which subsequently agreed to a trial that began in July 1386. 14th century Anglo-Saxon and Norman laws regarding rape/sexual assault often tied back to Roman legislation, specifically the idea of raptus, or the devaluation of a woman due to her abduction. Originally, this concept solely focused on abduction or elopement, until Justinian's code included sexual violence against single women, nuns, and widows. Looking back toward the 14th century, Raptus' inclusion of both abduction and sexual assault meant that, while rape was not necessarily ignored by Anglo-Saxon and Norman legal systems, abduction was often the primary focus. As a result, this meant that rape victims were unlikely to find success in court if their sexual assault was not proven with evidence of a physical abduction and they did not belong to a certain level of social status. The Carrouges' resided in (and the assault occurred in) the providence of Normandy, meaning that any rape-related legislation was likely influenced by the raptus concept. Because Marguerite's accusation did not involve her being physically abducted by le Gris but rather assaulted at her mother-in-law's estate, it would have been extremely difficult for her and Carrouges to find success in court against le Gris.

Marguerite was visibly pregnant during the proceedings and gave birth shortly before the duel, leading many to question the authenticity of her claim, as it was believed by the nobility that pregnancy could not result from rape. Additionally, many believed during this time that, in order to make a rape accusation, the supposed victim must look like they were raped. She would have to show the signs required to prove rape in a court of law, such as loose, disheveled hair and torn clothes.

In September 1386, the French Parliament ruled that a trial by ordeal (in this case a trial by combat) would take place to decide le Gris' guilt, a practice that had been banned for over 150 years by the Church at that time. Originating from Roman legal systems, trials by ordeal emerged as a reaction to a Roman law known as the adversarial principle. This principle, which required two eyewitness testimonies in criminal cases, made it difficult for prosecutors to charge certain cases. To counteract this law, trials of ordeal were enacted to prevent immediate acquittals due to a lack of witnesses. This practice later spread to other parts of Western Europe, where it was often used for crimes that occurred out of public view, such as simony or concubinage. Trial by ordeals continued to be practiced throughout the 12th century and into the early 13th century, until it was banned by Pope Innocent III during the Fourth Lateran Council in 1215. The Carrouges vs le Gris dispute was largely a case of he said, she said, with little additional evidence or eyewitness testimony. For the Carrouges family, a trial by duel meant avoiding the likely chance of le Gris getting acquitted in court due to a lack of evidence; For the French parliament, the duel meant a decisive end to an otherwise prolonged and messy conflict between two influential parties.

Due to its discontinuation, the use of trial by ordeal, like that which was used in Marguerite's case, had become a rarity of sorts in France. It was only really an option in very extenuating circumstances in the Court of Chivalry, which belonged to constables or marshals. Matters involving this form of trial had also become much more theatrical, involving the throwing of a gauntlet in the presence of the court and the assigning of a time and place where the duel may occur. The charges themselves could range from minor matters regarding petty gossip to treason against the crown. The duel between Carrouges and le Gris was chosen to be held in December 1386. Duels were considered a grand affair, with the parties involved making use of full armor and oftentimes being on horseback. These duels were so few and far between that the king would often be in attendance to witness the outcome for himself, meaning there would be an escalation in the judicial process for the case.

Furthermore, in the time of Carrouges and le Gris, knighthood was becoming less and less battle-focused, with this shift being fueled by the increased use of mercenaries, rather than knights, by local lords. Instead, knights increasingly played into the performance part of their identity, doing so through increased participation in jousting tournaments or demonstrations of their chivalric virtue at court. Chivalry had become a cult, an ideology, a little less than a 'secular religion', and as such, it influenced conduct during the conflict; the struggle was shaped by demands, demonstrations of prowess, and exigencies of loyalty. Because of this shift away from warfare, chivalrous demonstrations and a good reputation became increasingly important to knights who wanted to keep their status and recognition, which was always open to challenge and required constant defense. This additional emphasis on reputation meant that a loss in court would prove damaging to either party, while a victory would cement their chivalrous status for years to come.

The duel took place on 29 December 1386. After a long battle with a large number of onlookers, Le Gris was felled in combat by a sword to the side, making him guilty in the eyes of the law. Had Jean de Carrouges lost against le Gris instead, Marguerite would have been burned at the stake for perjury. This is because trials by ordeal were viewed as a form of divine judgment, in which the victor was viewed as righteous and aided by God. Therefore, the public would have perceived Carrouges' loss as God turning his back on the man because Marguerite's story was untrue.

=== Later life ===
Some sources say that another man confessed to Marguerite's rape while awaiting execution, and that Marguerite became a recluse and took a vow of chastity as a result. However, there is debate about the authenticity of this claim.

She had three children, was widowed in 1396, and died in 1419.

== In popular culture ==
The story of the duel inspired Ridley Scott's 2021 film The Last Duel (based on the 2004 book The Last Duel: A True Story of Crime, Scandal, and Trial by Combat in Medieval France by Eric Jager), in which she was played by Jodie Comer.
