= Eric Jager =

American historian (born 1957)

- Born: April 27, 1957 (age 69)
- Education: University of Michigan
- Occupation: Professor
- Writing career
- Genre: Medieval literature

Eric Jager (born April 27, 1957) is an American literary critic and a specialist in medieval literature. He is a professor in the department of English at University of California, Los Angeles, having received his B.A. from Calvin College (1979), and his M.A and Ph.D. from the University of Michigan (1982, 1987). He has also taught at Columbia University as an associate professor.

== Select bibliography ==
=== Articles ===
- Jager, Eric (1996). "The Book of the Heart: Reading and Writing the Medieval Subject". Speculum. 71 (1): 1–26. doi:10.2307/2865198. ISSN 0038-7134. JSTOR 2865198. S2CID 162115473.

=== Books ===
- Jager, Eric (1993). The Tempter's Voice: Language and the Fall in Medieval Literature (illustrated ed.). Ithaca, NY: Cornell University Press. ISBN 9780801480362. An alternate version of thie same publication year is ISBN 0801480361.
- —— (2000). The Book of the Heart (illustrated ed.). Chicago, IL: University of Chicago Press. ISBN 9780226391168. An alternate version of thie same publication year is ISBN 0226391167.
- The Last Duel: A True Story of Crime, Scandal, and Trial by Combat in Medieval France, 2004, London: Random House.
- Blood Royal: A True Tale of Crime and Detection in Medieval Paris, 2014, Little Brown and Company.
