= List of Open University people =

This is a partial list of alumni and staff of the Open University.

== Alumni ==
The OU has over two million alumni, including:

=== Politicians ===
- Fleur Anderson – Labour MP
- Ian Byrne – Labour MP
- Laurie Bristow – British diplomat
- Aimee Challenor – transgender activist and former Green Party politician
- Barbara Follett – former Labour MP
- Gerald Gardiner, Baron Gardiner – former Lord High Chancellor of Great Britain, completed his degree whilst serving as Chancellor of the Open University
- Bill Henderson – member of the Legislative Council (Isle of Man) and former member of the House of Keys
- David Heyes – former Labour MP
- Adam Ingram – former Labour MP and Minister of State for Northern Ireland and the Armed Forces
- Andrea Jenkyns – Reform UK Mayor of Greater Lincolnshire and former Conservative MP
- Marat Khusnullin – Deputy Prime Minister of Russia
- Peter Law – Welsh independent (formerly Labour) politician and former MP and AM for Blaenau Gwent
- Paul Marsden – writer, businessman and former Labour/Liberal Democrat MP
- John McFall – former Labour MP and Lord Speaker of the House of Lords
- Wendy Morton – Conservative MP, Shadow Minister for Development and former Chief Whip of the House of Commons
- Chris Pond – former Labour MP
- John Reid – former Labour MP and minister, including the roles of Health, Defence and Home Secretary
- Graham Smith – republican activist and CEO of Republic
- Meles Zenawi – former Prime Minister of Ethiopia

=== Entertainers ===
- Joan Armatrading – singer/songwriter
- Elizabeth Arnold – children's writer
- Steve Backshall – naturalist and television presenter
- Nigel Benson – author and illustrator
- Connie Booth – actress
- Katy Cavanagh – actress
- Julie Christie – actress
- Lisa Coleman – actress and volunteer occupational therapist
- Micky Dolenz – formerly of The Monkees
- Lionel Fanthorpe – priest, entertainer, television presenter, author and lecturer
- Romola Garai – actress
- Hubert Gregg – radio presenter
- Jerry Hall – model/actress
- Frank Hampson – creator of Dan Dare
- Sheila Hancock – actress
- Lenny Henry – entertainer
- Nadiya Hussain – chef, author, television presenter
- Matthew Kelly – television presenter
- Mylene Klass – actress, singer, model, pianist and media personality
- Clare Nasir – meteorologist and television presenter
- David Neilson – actor
- Ian Rankin – Scottish writer
- Talulah Riley – actress
- Dave Rowntree – drummer (formerly of Blur), Labour politician, solicitor and composer
- Julia Sawalha – actress
- Graeme K Talboys – writer and teacher
- Susan Tully – television producer and director; former actress
- Holly Willoughby – television presenter
- Daisy Edgar-Jones – actress

=== Scientists and engineers ===
- Colette Henry – social scientist and Head of Department of Business Studies at Dundalk Institute of Technology
- Nigel Roberts – computer scientist
- Chris Whitty – Chief Medical Officer for England
- Robin Wilson – mathematician

=== Law ===
- Nigel Bridge – Lord Bridge of Harwich, retired Law Lord

=== Sport ===
- Craig Brown – football manager
- Ben Davies – Welsh footballer
- Helen Richardson-Walsh – field hockey player
- Ran Sagiv – Israeli Olympic triathlete
- Frank Turner –Olympic gymnast

=== Military ===
- Air Chief Marshal Sir Brian Burridge – Royal Air Force officer
- Peter Cottrell – author, historian and former Royal Navy and British Army officer
- Air-Vice Marshal David Anthony Hobart – Royal Air Force officer

=== Religion ===
- Eric Nash Devenport – former Bishop of Dunwich
- Zerbanoo Gifford – author, human rights campaigner and President of World Zoroastrian Organisation

=== Miscellaneous ===
- Bobby Cummines – charity chief executive and reformed offender
- J. Colin Dodds – academic and former President of Saint Mary's University (Halifax)
- Christine Grosar – cave diver and explorer
- Rose Hanbury – peeress, model and political staffer
- Jeanette Henderson – author, academic, social worker, and radio broadcaster
- Myra Hindley – convicted murderer and prisoner
- Gerry Hughes – sailor, and first deaf person to single-handedly cross the Atlantic
- Natalya Kaspersky – IT entrepreneur, and co-founder and co-owner of Kaspersky Lab
- Ken Robinson – educationalist and author
- Gwyn Singleton – dyslexia activist and educationalist
- Mary Stuart – academic and former Vice-Chancellor of the University of Lincoln
- Peter Ventress – businessman

=== Honorary graduates ===
- Sir David Attenborough – British broadcaster and naturalist
- Tim Berners-Lee – engineer, computer scientist and inventor of the World Wide Web
- Mary Beard – classicist and television presenter
- Gordon Brown – Prime Minister of the United Kingdom and Leader of the Labour Party from 2007 to 2010
- Cerrie Burnell – actress, author and former television presenter
- Sharon Corr – singer-songwriter and musician
- Brian Cox – physicist
- Richard Dawkins – British ethologist, evolutionary biologist and author
- Edward Heath – Prime Minister of the United Kingdom from 1970 to 1974 and Leader of the Conservative Party from 1965 to 1975
- Prue Leith – restaurateur, television presenter and writer
- Judy Murray – tennis coach
- Terry Pratchett – English fantasy author
- Benjamin Zephaniah – poet and author

== Staff ==
- Katharine Ellis, music historian
- John Fauvel, historian of mathematics
- Derek S. Pugh, Professor Emeritus for International Management
- Robin Wilson, mathematician
- Colin Pilinger, Professor, Known for Beagle 2 Mars lander
