= Grosart =

Grosart is a surname. Notable people with the surname include:

- Alexander Balloch Grosart (1827–1899), Scottish clergyman and literary editor
- Allister Grosart (1906–1984), Canadian journalist and politician
- Christine Grosart, British cave diver and explorer
- George Grosart (1880–1902), American baseball player

== See also ==
- Grossart (disambiguation)
