= Grossart =

Grossart is a surname. Notable people with the surname include:

- Sir Angus Grossart (1937–2022), Scottish businessman
- William Grossart (1896–?), Scottish World War I flying ace

== See also ==
- Grosart (disambiguation)
