= Clare Warren =

British geologist

Clare J. Warren
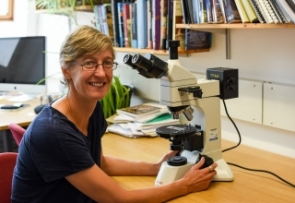
- Born: 1977 (age 48–49)
- Education: University of Oxford
- Scientific career
- Workplaces: Open University; Dalhousie University
- Thesis: Continental subduction beneath the semail ophiolite, Oman : constraints from U-Pb geochronology and metamorphic modelling (2004)

Clare Warren (born 1977) is a British geologist who is Professor of Earth Sciences at the Open University. Her research considers metamorphic petrology and how deeply buried rocks record information about their burial and exhumation. She was awarded the Geological Society of London Dewey Medal in 2022.

== Early life and education ==
Warren was an undergraduate student at the University of Oxford, where she studied earth sciences. After graduating she moved to University College London, where she earned a master's degree in hydrogeology. She remained in Oxford for her graduate research, where she investigated the Arabian continental margin underneath Semail Ophiolite. After graduating Warren joined Dalhousie University as a Killam Fellow.

== Research and career ==
Warren joined the Open University in 2011 as a Natural Environment Research Council advanced postdoctoral fellow. Her early research considered how quickly Indian continental crust was buried underneath Tibet. This work led her to focus her career on understanding the processes that occur when continents collide or mountains form. She studies metamorphic petrology, including mineral scale processes and large scale tectonics. This has included studying argon diffusion and ultra-high-pressure metamorphism (UHP) rocks. Her work on the exhumation of UHP rocks has identified new mechanisms.

Warren serves as lead of the Open University Dynamic Earth Research Group. She was made a Professor of Metamorphic Geology in 2020.

== Awards and honours ==
- 2020 Mineralogical Society of Great Britain and Ireland UK Metamorphic Studies Group Barrow Award
- 2022 Geological Society of London Dewey Medal

== Selected publications ==
- Warren, Clare J.; C. Beaumont; R.A. Jamieson (2008). "Modelling tectonic styles and ultra-high pressure (UHP) rock exhumation during the transition from oceanic subduction to continental collision". Earth and Planetary Science Letters. 267 (1–2): 129–145. Bibcode:2008E&PSL.267..129W. doi:10.1016/j.epsl.2007.11.025. Wikidata Q104415141.
- Warren, Clare J.; Randall R. Parrish; David J. Waters; Michael P. Searle (2005). "Dating the geologic history of Oman's Semail ophiolite: insights from U-Pb geochronology". Contributions to Mineralogy and Petrology. 150 (4): 403–422. Bibcode:2005CoMP..150..403W. doi:10.1007/s00410-005-0028-5. Wikidata Q96007531.
- M.P Searle; C.J Warren; D.J Waters; R.R Parrish (2004). "Structural evolution, metamorphism and restoration of the Arabian continental margin, Saih Hatat region, Oman Mountains". Journal of Structural Geology. 26 (3): 451–473. doi:10.1016/j.jsg.2003.08.005. Wikidata Q104415160.
- Yardley, B. W. D.; Warren, Clare (2021). An introduction to metamorphic petrology (2 ed.). Cambridge. ISBN 978-1-108-65955-0. OCLC 1226719524.
