= Open Research Online =

Open Research Online (ORO) is a repository of research publications run by The Open University (OU).

It uses the GNU ePrints software, and its repositories use the Open Archives Initiative Protocol for Metadata Harvesting.

It is an open access repository, and it accepts books, journal articles, patents, conference articles, and theses.

== Publications ==
As of 21 September 2008, 496 of its publications are from the Mathematics and Computing Department of the OU, while over two thousand are from the Science department. As of 2023 the STEM department has the most overall publication downloads of any department with total downloads sitting at 22,310 for the Jul 1, 2023 – Jul 11, 2023 period.
