= David Gordon Scott =

British criminologist (born 1971)

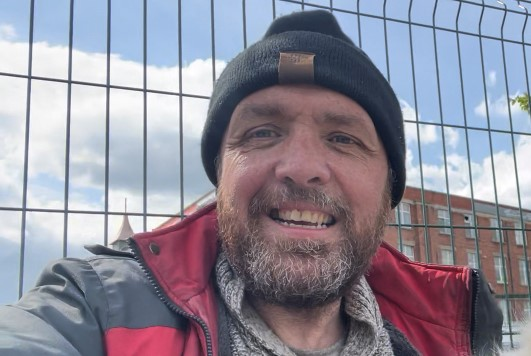
- Born: 1971 (age 54–55); Bishop Auckland, England
- Occupations: Criminologist, abolitionist and author

Academic background
- Education: Lancaster University; University of Central Lancashire
- Thesis: Ghosts beyond our realm: A neo-abolitionist analysis of prisoner human rights and prison officer culture (2006)

Academic work
- Institutions: The Open University

David Gordon Scott is a British criminologist, abolitionist and author. He is a criminologist at The Open University in Milton Keynes.

Scott's research interests span the field of criminology, particularly focusing on socialist ethics, abolitionism, social murder, liberative justice, harms of capitalist states, and state-corporate harm.

Scott is the Co-Founding Editor of the Journal Justice, Power and Resistance. He is also known for his contributions in documentaries including Punishment: A Failed Social Experiment and the BBC Ideas Viewpoint – What Would A World Without Prisons Be Like?

== Early life and education ==
Scott received a B.A. honours degree in Applied Social Science in 1994 and a post-graduate master's degree in Crime, Deviance and Social Policy in 1996 from Lancaster University. Later, in 2006, he completed his PhD under the supervision of Barbara Hudson from the University of Central Lancashire, and his thesis was titled Ghosts beyond our realm: A neo-abolitionist analysis of prisoner human rights and prison officer culture. He has also earned a certificate in Adult Education teaching from City and Guilds and became a Fellow of the Higher Education Academy.

== Career ==
Scott joined Edge Hill College of Higher Education as a Temporary Lecturer in Criminology and held an appointment as a lecturer of sociology at the New College of Further and Higher Education in Durham from 1996 till 1998. Afterwards, he was appointed as a lecturer in criminology at the University of Northumbria. He was then promoted to a Senior Lecturer in Criminology in 2000 at the University of Central Lancashire, a position he held for 13 years.

During his work span at the University of Central Lancashire, Scott has served as an International Ambassador at the University of Geneva in Switzerland, Université de Savoie and the Catholic University of Lyon in France and the UCLan Cyprus Campus.

In 2009 he was appointed as an International coordinator of the European Group for the Study of Deviance and Social Control. Subsequently, in 2012 he held a brief appointment as a Coordinator of the Working Group on Prison, Detention and Punishment. Afterwards, in 2014 he co-founded an independent academic publisher named EG Press and worked as a Director there until 2018. He is currently serving as the Chair of the ‘Weavers Uprising Bicentennial Remembrance Committee’.

Scott is the Co-Founding Editor of the Journal Justice, Power and Resistance. He is also known for his contributions in documentaries including Punishment: A Failed Social Experiment and the BBC Ideas Viewpoint – What Would A World Without Prisons Be Like?

== Research ==
Scott's research is focused in the field of criminology with a specific interest in the impacts of punishment and prison. He has authored books, book chapters, blogs and journal articles in this field.

=== Critical criminology ===
Scott was trained in, and has subsequently contributed to, the intellectual tradition known as critical criminology, especially in his co-edited books Expanding the Criminological Imagination/ and Demystifying Power, Crime and Social Harm. He argues that whilst poverty and social and economic inequalities are important contexts in relation to street level property offences, excessive power is the most criminogenic factor in the generation of serious social harms. He argues that the most dangerous and deadly harms facing the people and planet are created by the rich and powerful and maintains that the 'criminological imagination' should focus primarily on avoidable and deadly harms generated though acts of commission or omission by corporations, capitalist states and other powerful individuals and groups.

When researching the Grenfell Tower fire, June 14, 2017, where 72 people lost their lives, Scott drew upon the concept of social murder to emphasise the responsibilities of the powerful. He argued this in his film Grenfell Tower and Social Murder, which he co-made with Hamlett Films for The Open University in 2017.

=== Community responsiveness ===
Scott has promoted the ideas of community responsiveness in his scholarship. Scott argues that community responsiveness has two interlinked parts: the first is concerned with the manner in which people collectively respond to the needs of a given community and the second regards the ways in which a given community responds to the problems confronting it. According to Scott, community responsiveness entails genuinely listening to diverse and marginalised voices as a means of facilitating the building of capacity, competency and capabilities in the interests of safety and wellbeing for all. In his ethnographic study Community Policing in Southwest Lancashire, undertaken in the mid-1990s, Scott found that the practices of community policing in three Lancashire towns failed to adhere to the principles of community responsiveness. Instead, community policing as practiced often involved the surveillance of class based and other discriminatory stereotypes, augmenting rather than replacing coercive forms of policing.

In his books Against Imprisonment and For Abolition, Scott considers further the second dimension of community responsiveness, which he conceives as a form of direct action working against penal repression and towards a more equitable society . Scott's writings chart the mobilising of community responses, led by 'ordinary rebels', against the building of new mega-prisons in Wigan, Greater Manchester and Chorley, West Lancashire and in so doing reviews the strategies and capacity building interventions of these campaigns. Scott has also explored community responsiveness through the lens of the ‘common’, which reflects the common interests of the common people. Scott advocated the political project of the 'common' as a way promoting inclusive communities and building capabilities and competencies of citizens to perform an active role in finding socially just solutions to shared problems, including lawbreaking.

=== Prisons ===
Scott's broad research in investigating prisoners and their life in prison led him to identify behavioral aspects of prisoners and officers, legal rights and politics related to it. In his early research, he documented that the Human Rights Act (HRA) was not institutionalized in prisons as officers consider prisoners as ghosts-like and do not acknowledge their needs and sufferings. Later, he stated that to get a positive interaction with officers a prisoner must maintain the appropriate deference due to officer's superior status. He claimed that assessment of existing policies and the level of training available prior to its implementation and the reassuring messages sent to the staff via official discourse are the methods to identify the restricted interpretation of the Human Rights Act. In April 2020 he gave evidence in the only UK based case on the harms of COVID19 in prisons in the UK in a Report for the High Court of Justice (Queens Bench Division) Administrative Court for the case of R v Secretary of State (ex parte Davis).

Apart from officer-prisoner behavior and policies, Scott as a prison abolitionist has worked for the welfare of prisoners by highlighting the mundane misery prisoners suffer every day. He described physical, cultural, and structural as three forms of violence that take place in prison and explained how this is directly related to suicidal ideation. He further maintained that anti-violence and harm reduction strategies such as Therapeutic Communities can be a radical alternative for certain people in certain circumstances. He subsequently argued that the ideology underscoring the case that prisoners’ rights are not of public interest or political concern is a punitive thought and should be challenged but that a human rights agenda should not be based on the likeability of those involved or making individuals sympathetic.

=== Penal abolition ===
Scott has also focused his research on penal abolition with a particular focus on its local and global perspective, something which is explored in detail in his co-edited book the International Handbook of Penal Abolition. He has talked about five different interventions that can aid penal abolitionists to have a democratic dialogue and also discussed the impacts of abolitionist theory with public participation and the importance of conceiving penal abolition as a future-oriented philosophy of hope, in a chapter of the book The Routledge Handbook of Public Criminologies. Later, in 2021, he described a retrospective on penal abolition as a language, intellectual and theoretical perspective, social movement, political strategy, set of ethico-political values, and revolutionary praxis. While setting out the practical possibilities of penal abolitionism and transformative justice he proposed that community-based interventions such as restorative justice are required and those who cause harm should be held accountable. He has referred to this as an ‘abolitionist real utopia’. He has recently returned to his early work on the relationship between penal abolition and the Christian prison chaplain and found tensions between carceral Christian theologies and abolitionist liberation theologies. This reflected some ideas to inform abolitionist theologies to Christian prison chaplaincy regarding penal abolition with respect to the socialist ethics of dignity, empathy, freedom, and paradigm of life while working against an unchristian institution. He makes similar arguments about socialist ethics, liberative justice and penal dehumanisation in his book For Abolition.

=== Liberative justice ===
Scott explored the notion of Liberative Justice in his first book Heavenly Confinement?, which was a published version of his 1996 MA thesis. In his 2016 book Emancipatory Politics and Praxis, Scott defines liberative justice as a form of subversive praxis that requires direct engagement in the struggle for freedom from domination. His own engagement in emancipatory praxis includes numerous anti-prison and anti-capitalist direct actions, campaigns, and protests since the mid-1990s. Scott also led the campaign for bicentennial commemorations of the 1826 weavers' uprising. He argues that the weavers' uprising was a struggle for liberative justice motivated by a desire for a dignified life. However, the nineteenth century protestors were criminalised, excessively punished, and regarded as being irrationally fearful of industrialisation. Further, the state killings of at least six protestors at the Chatterton Massacre on 26 April 1826, and other deaths of protestors and bystanders during the uprising or directly arising from it, were for a long time largely forgotten. He refers to this as an example of epistemic injustice.

Scott referred to the mass deaths from starvation and related illnesses following the weavers' uprising as social murder and the limited understandings of their suffering and struggle for liberative justice as a form of epistemic injustice. Scott has applied the concepts of social death, legal murder and social murder to other state and state-corporate harms as a means of shaming the state; promoting reparations, redress, and repair for victims of injustice; and encouraging better material conditions and human flourishing for all in the future. In Emancipatory Politics and Praxis, he maintained that socialists must avoid the temptation to use the penal law in response to the harms of power: liberative justice can never be achieved through punishment and making power answerable must be achieved through democratic and non-penal means.

=== Socialist ethics ===
The central theme of Scott's writing and activism is the realization of a society based on socialist ethics. His work emphasizes the importance of identifying and inspiring direct action to address knowledge of injustice, wrongdoing, and social harm in non-coercive ways. Scott's engagement with socialist ethics began with an appraisal of the work of the Mexican Marxist José Porfirio Miranda in the mid-1990s, as explored in his book Heavenly Confinement?

Scott's focus on socialist response ethics is particularly evident in his advocacy for anti-poverty and anti-prison activism. He has also championed an abolitionist ethical hermeneutics, which emphasizes not only hearing but also amplifying the voices of marginalized groups. This approach entails an understanding of voice, including engaging with those who stand outside culturally accepted forms of representation and interpreting the silence or absence of voice among subaltern groups.

Scott has applied this framework to critique punishment, legal coercion, and the coercive state. In his book Abolitionist Voices, he outlined the principles of socialist response ethics. In Envisioning Abolition, Scott and co-author E. Bell explored how prisons, punishment, and state coercion conflict with the principles and virtues of socialism. The book examines how socialist and anarchist thinkers from the late 18th to the early 20th centuries consistently critiqued the coercive state and its punitive mechanisms, advocating for their abolition.

== Bibliography ==
=== Authored books ===
- Penology (2008) ISBN 978-1-4129-4811-1
- Controversial Issues in Prisons (2010) ISBN 978-0-335-22303-9
- Prisons and Punishment: The Essentials (2014) ISBN 978-1-4462-7347-0
- Emancipatory Politics and Praxis: An Anthology of Essays written for the European Group for the Study of Deviance and Social Control (2016) ISBN 978-1-911439-01-1
- Against Imprisonment: An Anthology of Abolitionist Essays (2018) ISBN 978-1-909976-54-2
- For Abolition: Essays on Prisons and Socialist Ethics (2020) ISBN 978-1-909976-82-5

=== Edited books ===
- Expanding the Criminological Imagination: Critical readings in Criminology (2006) ISBN 978-1-84392-156-1
- Why Prison? (2013) ISBN 978-1-107-52180-3
- The International Handbook of Penal Abolition (2021) ISBN 978-0-367-69329-9
- Demystifying Power, Crime and Social Harm: The Work and Legacy of Steven Box (2023) ISBN 978-3-031-46212-2
- Abolitionist Voices (2024) ISBN 978-1-5292-2403-0
- Envisioning Abolition (2024) ISBN 978-1-5292-3477-0
