= Open University =

Public research university in the UK

Coordinates: 52°01′30″N 0°42′20″W

The Open University
- Coat of Arms of The Open University
- Motto: Learn and Live
- Type: Public, distance education university
- Established: 1969; 57 years ago
- Founders: Harold Wilson; Jennie Lee; Walter Perry; Peter Venables
- Accreditation: Triple accreditation
- Affiliations: ACU; EUA; Middle States Association of Colleges and Schools; University Alliance; Universities UK
- Budget: £474.1 million (2019–20)
- Chancellor: Baroness Lane-Fox of Soho
- Vice-Chancellor: David Phoenix
- Students: 199,391 (2023)
- Undergraduates: 139,117 (2023)
- Postgraduates: 10,103 (2023)
- Location: Milton Keynes, Buckinghamshire, United Kingdom
- Campus: 110 acres (45 ha); Walton Hall
Colours
- Website: open.ac.uk
- Location of main campus

The Open University (OU) is a public research university and the largest university in the United Kingdom by number of students. The majority of the OU's undergraduate students are based in the United Kingdom and principally study off-campus; many of its courses (both undergraduate and postgraduate) can also be studied anywhere in the world. There are also a number of full-time postgraduate research students based on the 45 ha (110-acre) university campus at Walton Hall in Milton Keynes, Buckinghamshire, where they use the staff facilities for research, as well as more than 1,000 members of academic and research staff and over 2,500 administrative, operational and support staff.

The OU was established in 1969 and was initially based at Alexandra Palace, north London, using the television studios and editing facilities which had been vacated by the BBC. The first students enrolled in January 1971. The university administration is now based at Walton Hall, but has administration centres in other parts of the United Kingdom. It also has a presence in other European countries. The university awards undergraduate and postgraduate degrees, as well as non-degree qualifications such as diplomas and certificates or continuing education units. It also offers unique Open Degrees, in which students may study any combination of modules across all subjects.

With around 200,000 students including around 34% of new undergraduates aged under 25 and more than 8,599 overseas students, it is the largest academic institution in the United Kingdom (and one of the largest in Europe) by student number, and qualifies as one of the world's largest universities. Since it was founded, more than 2.3 million students have studied with the Open University. The Open University is one of only two (Note: The other is Richmond, The American International University in London) United Kingdom higher education institutions to gain accreditation in the United States by the Middle States Commission on Higher Education. It also produces more CEOs than any other United Kingdom university. Former United Kingdom prime minister Gordon Brown, astrophysicist Jocelyn Bell Burnell, broadcaster Anna Ford and actress Glenda Jackson are among those who have tutored for the OU.

== History ==
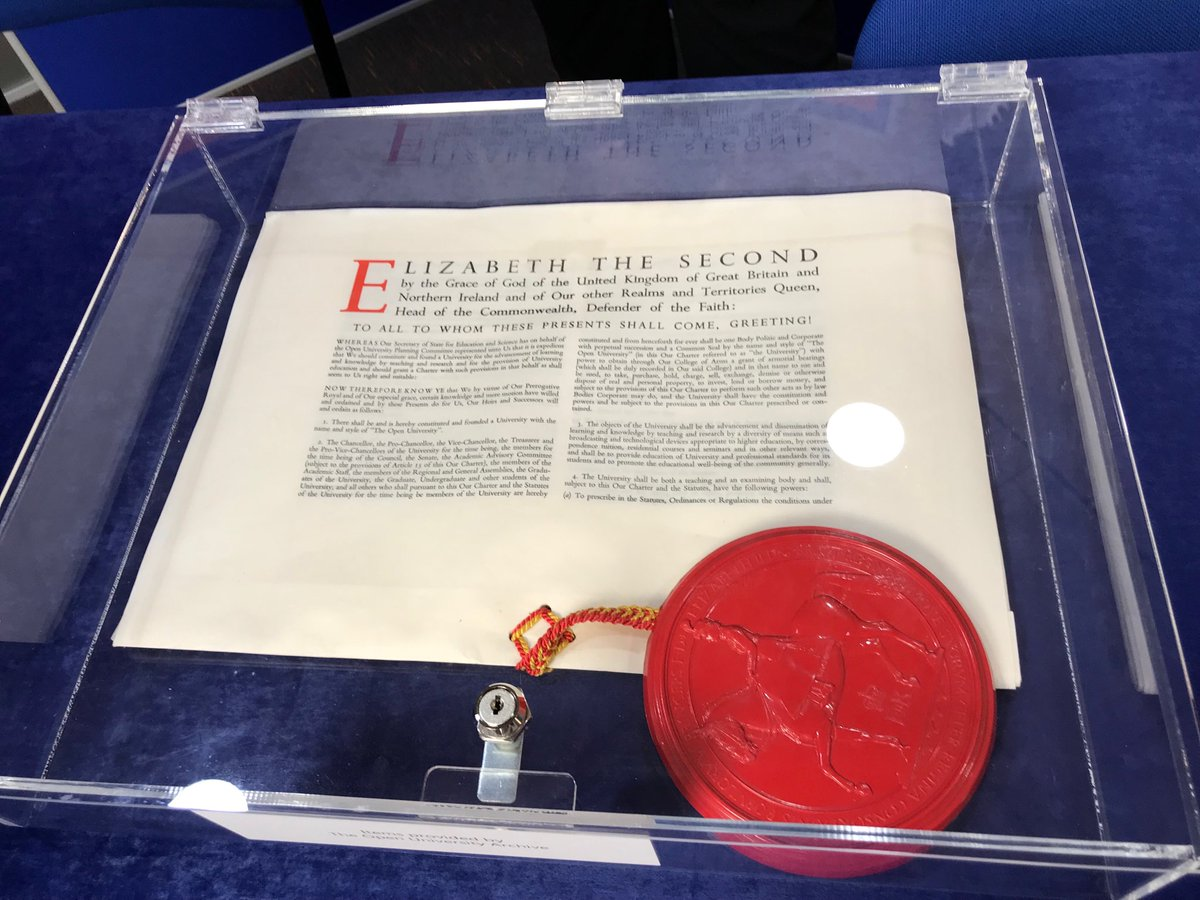
The Royal Charter of The Open University

The Open University was founded by the Labour government under Prime Minister Harold Wilson. Wilson was a strong advocate, using the vision of Michael Young.

Planning commenced in 1965, under the Minister of State for Education Jennie Lee, who established a model for the OU as one of widening access to the highest standards of scholarship in higher education, and set up a planning committee consisting of university vice-chancellors, educationalists and television broadcasters, chaired by Sir Peter Venables.

The British Broadcasting Corporation (BBC) Assistant Director of Engineering at the time James Redmond, had obtained most of his qualifications at night school, and his natural enthusiasm for the project did much to overcome the technical difficulties of using television to broadcast teaching programmes.

Queen Elizabeth II visits The Open University in 1979.

Wilson envisaged The Open University as a major marker in the Labour Party's commitment to modernising British society. He believed that it would help build a more competitive economy while also promoting greater equality of opportunity and social mobility. The planned use of television and radio to broadcast its courses was also supposed to link The Open University to the technological revolution under way, which Wilson saw as a major ally of his modernisation schemes.

However, from the start, Lee encountered widespread scepticism and even opposition from within and beyond the Labour Party, including senior officials in the Department of Education and Science (DES), her departmental head Anthony Crosland, the Treasury, ministerial colleagues, such as Richard Crossman and commercial broadcasters. The Open University was realised due to Lee's unflagging determination and tenacity between 1965 and 1967, the steadfast support from Wilson, and the fact that the anticipated costs, as reported to Lee and Wilson by Arnold Goodman, seemed very modest.

By the time the actual, much higher costs became apparent, it was too late to scrap the fledgling university. The university was granted a royal charter by the Privy Council on 23 April 1969.

== Organisation and administration ==
=== Staff ===
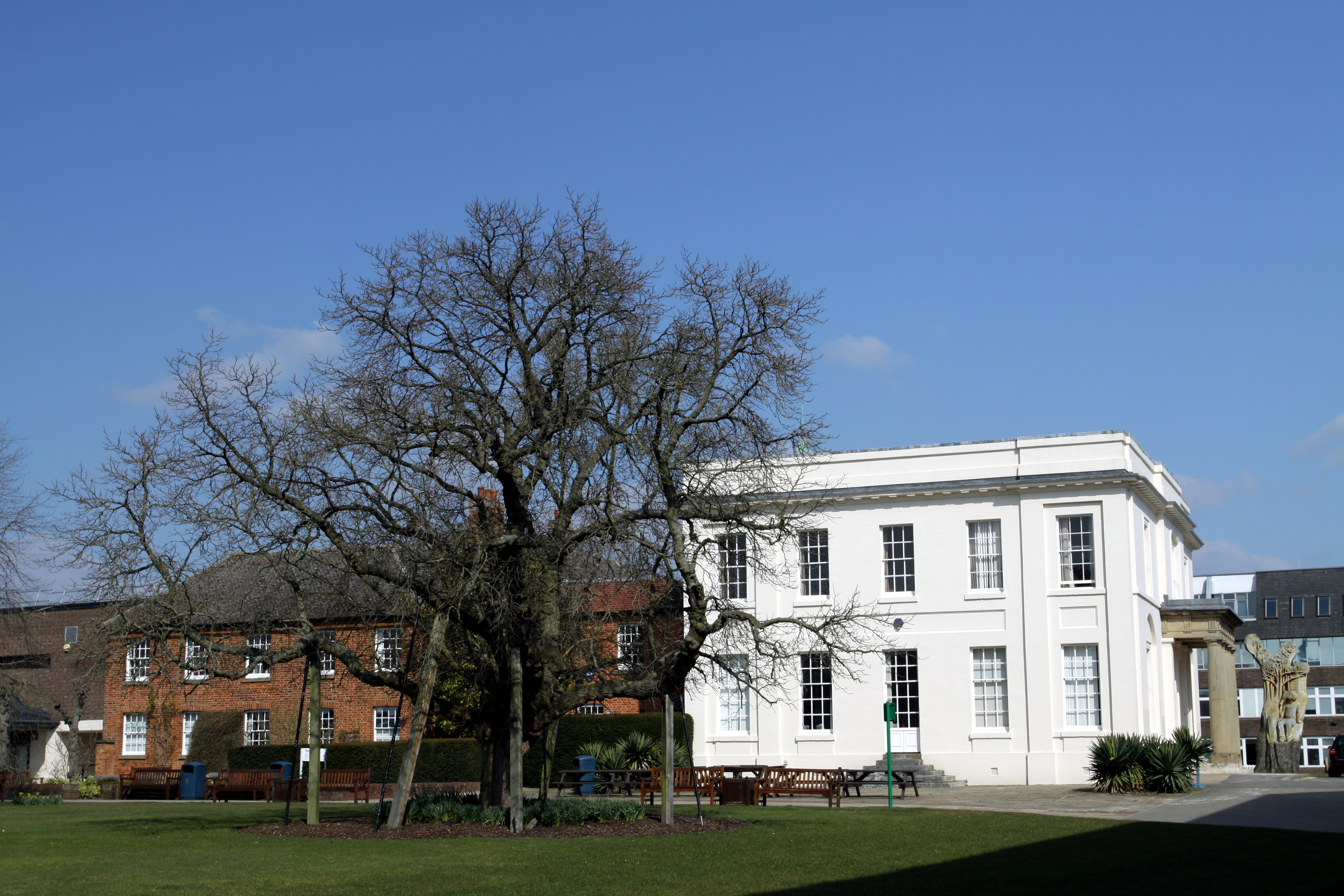
Walton manor house, the vice-chancellor's office and the second-oldest building on the OU Campus

The majority of staff are part-time associate lecturers and, as of the 2021–22 academic year, almost 5,000 work for the OU. There are also 1,427 (mostly full-time) salaried academic employees (central academics based at Walton Hall and staff tutors based in a variety of regional locations) who are research active and responsible for the production and presentation of teaching materials, 2,502 who are academic-related and 1,905 support staff (including secretaries and technicians). Salaries are the OU's main cost—over £598 million for the 2021–22 academic year. In 2010, The Sunday Times named OU as one of the 'Best Places to Work in the Public Sector'.

==== Credit union ====
Open University Employees Credit Union is a savings and loans co-operative established by the university for staff in 1994. A member of the Association of British Credit Unions, it is authorised by the Prudential Regulation Authority and regulated by the Financial Conduct Authority and the PRA. Ultimately, like the banks and building societies, members' savings are protected against business failure by the Financial Services Compensation Scheme.

=== Regional Offices ===
The OU has regional offices in Cardiff, Belfast, and Edinburgh.

=== Academic divisions ===
==== Faculties ====
In 2016, the university reorganised its departments and now operates with the Faculty of Arts & Social Sciences (FASS); the Faculty of Business and Law (FBL); the Faculty of Science, Technology, Engineering and Mathematics (STEM); and the Faculty of Wellbeing, Education and Language Studies (WELS). It also runs Open and Access programmes via PVC-Students, and programmes from the Institute of Educational Technology (IET) via WELS.

==== Open University Business School ====
In 1982, Open University offered a course titled, "The Effective Manager", developed by a team that was led by Charles Handy. After the reported success of the course, Derek S. Pugh proposed the establishment of a business school. In 1988, the Open University Business School (OUBS) was founded by the Faculty of Management department, for which professor Andrew Thomson was appointed to head. Thomson's main goal was the offering of an MBA programme, which was eventually funded through a grant from the DES. In 1989, the first class of MBA students were enrolled.

The Open University Business School is accredited by the international accrediting bodies AACSB, AMBA, and EQUIS, known as triple accreditation.

Some selected rankings:

- The OU Business School's MBA programme was ranked 13th in the Financial Times’ global rankings of online and distance learning MBA providers which featured five European schools, four of which were in the UK.
- Ranked fifth in the Global Online MBA Rankings by CEO Magazine and 1st for UK institutions (2019).
- Ranked sixth in the world for the QS Distance Online MBA Rankings (2016).

=== Singapore Institute of Management Open University Centre ===
From 1992 to 2005, the Singapore Institute of Management (SIM) ran the Open University Degree Programme (OUDP), in collaboration with The Open University, United Kingdom (OUUK), which was renamed the Singapore Institute of Management's Open University Centre (SIM-OUC) as one of SIM's autonomous entity. In 2005, after SIM formed SIM University (UniSIM), it took over SIM-OUC students and granted those who graduated in 2006 a choice between a UniSIM or OUUK degree.

== Academic profile ==
=== Teaching methods ===
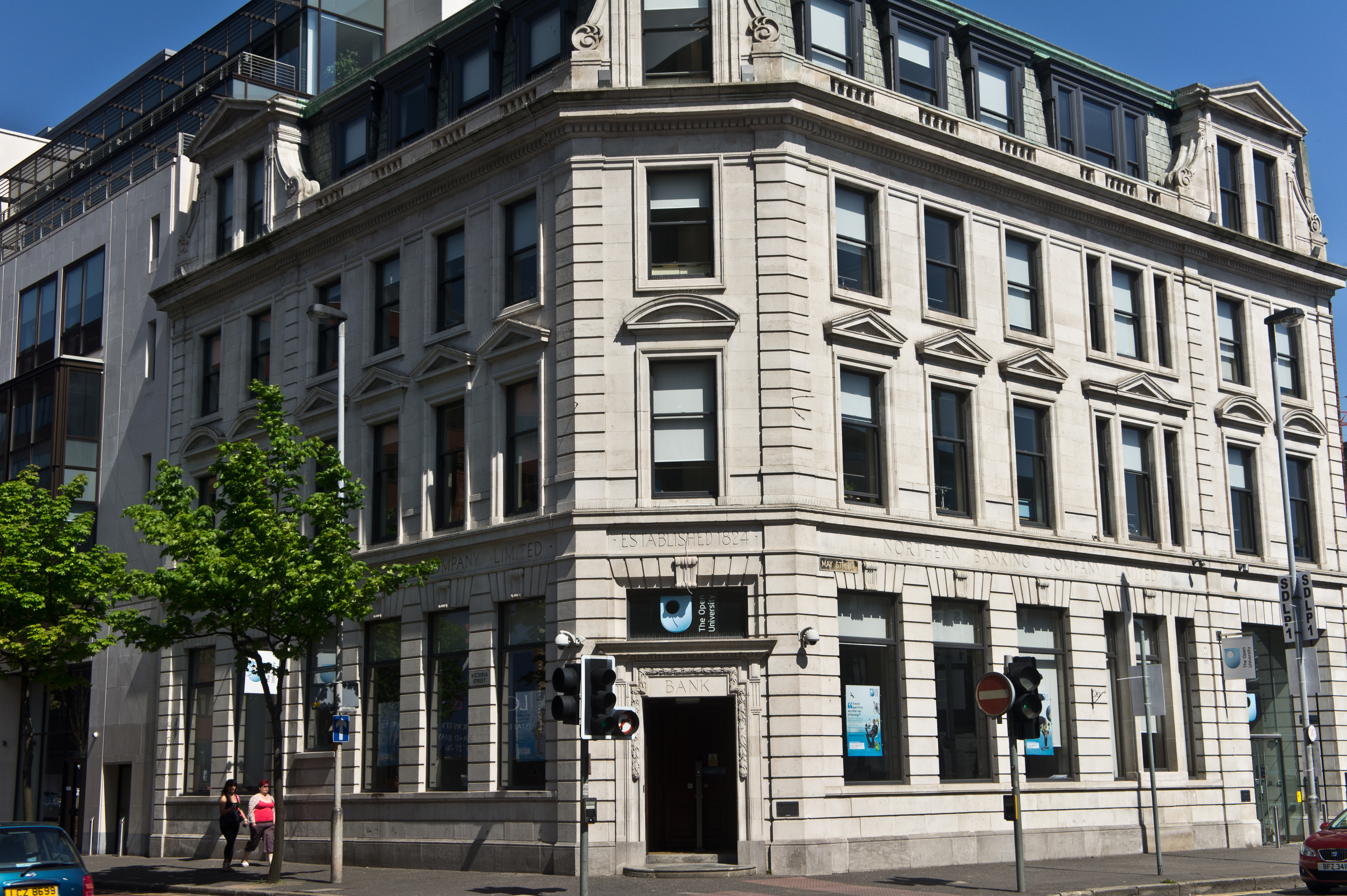
The Open University in Belfast

The OU has used a variety of methods for teaching, including written and audio materials, the Internet, disc-based software and television programmes on DVD. Course-based television broadcasts by the BBC, which started on 3 January 1971, ceased on 15 December 2006. Materials comprise originally authored work by in-house and external academic contributors, and from third-party materials licensed for use by OU students. For most modules, students are supported by tutors ("associate lecturers") who provide feedback on their work and are generally available to them at face-to-face tutorials, by telephone, and/or on the internet. A number of short courses worth ten credits are now available that do not have an assigned tutor but offer an online conferencing service (Internet forum) where help and advice are offered through conferencing "moderators".

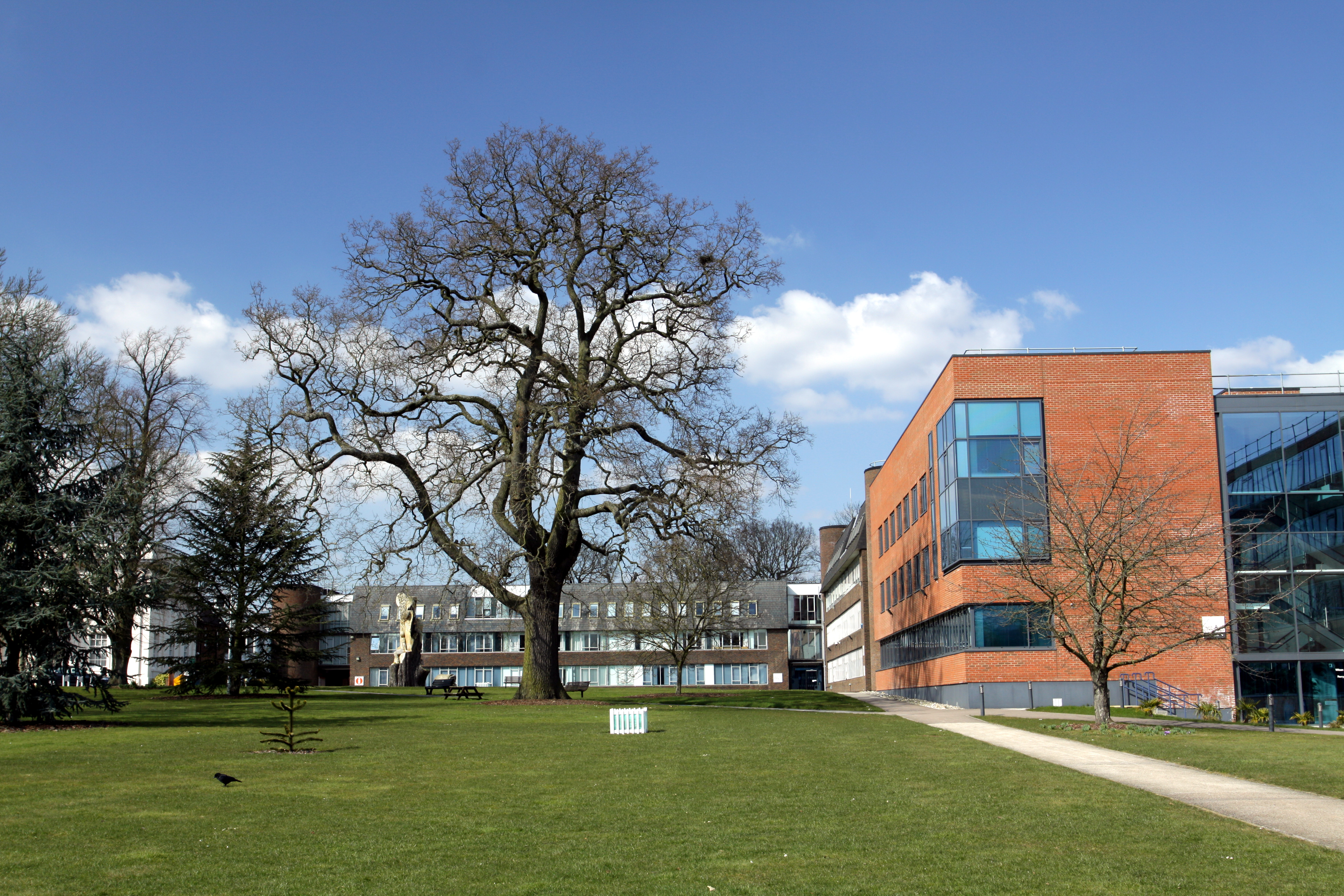
Perry C building in Open University Campus in Milton Keynes

Prior to the COVID-19 pandemic, some modules have mandatory day schools. Nevertheless, it used to be possible to be excused on the basis of ill health (or other extenuating circumstances) and many courses have no mandatory face-to-face component. Similarly, some modules used to run week-long summer schools offering an opportunity for students to remove themselves from the general distractions of their life and focus on their studies for a short time.

The university no longer offers any in-person tutorials - all teaching is done online.

For many years the OU produced television and radio programmes aimed at bringing learning to a wider audience. In its early years, most of these were in the form of documentaries or filmed lectures. Latterly, most OU-associated programming was mainstream and broadcast in peak hours, including series such as Rough Science and "Battle of the Geeks", while older-style programming was carried in the BBC Learning Zone.

In 2004, the OU announced it was to stop its late-night programmes on BBC Two, and the last programme was broadcast at 5.30 am on 16 December 2006. The university shifted its focus to semi-academic television programmes, such as many now broadcast on BBC Four.

The Open University launched FutureLearn in December 2012 with a dozen UK university partners.

The Quality Assurance Agency for Higher Education review published in December 2015 found five areas of good practice and made three recommendations for improvement. The English national survey of student satisfaction has twice put the Open University in first place.

In October 2006, the OU joined the open educational resources movement with the launch of OpenLearn. A growing selection of current and past distance learning course materials will be released for free access, including downloadable versions for educators to modify (under the Creative Commons BY-NC-SA licence), plus free collaborative learning-support tools.

In the early 2000s, the OU researched the use of virtual worlds in teaching and learning, and had two main islands in Second Life. In May 2009, these regions formed the basis of a case study by Linden Lab, the company which owns Second Life.

In mid-2010, the university led the list of contributing universities in the number of downloads of its material from the educational resources site iTunes U, with downloads of over 20 million. Open University continues to adopt Moodle as the Virtual Learning Environment (VLE) with their own team deploying custom plugins.

In 2013, the OU began a massive open online course (MOOC) platform called FutureLearn, which is the UK's largest provider of free online courses.

=== Assessment methods ===
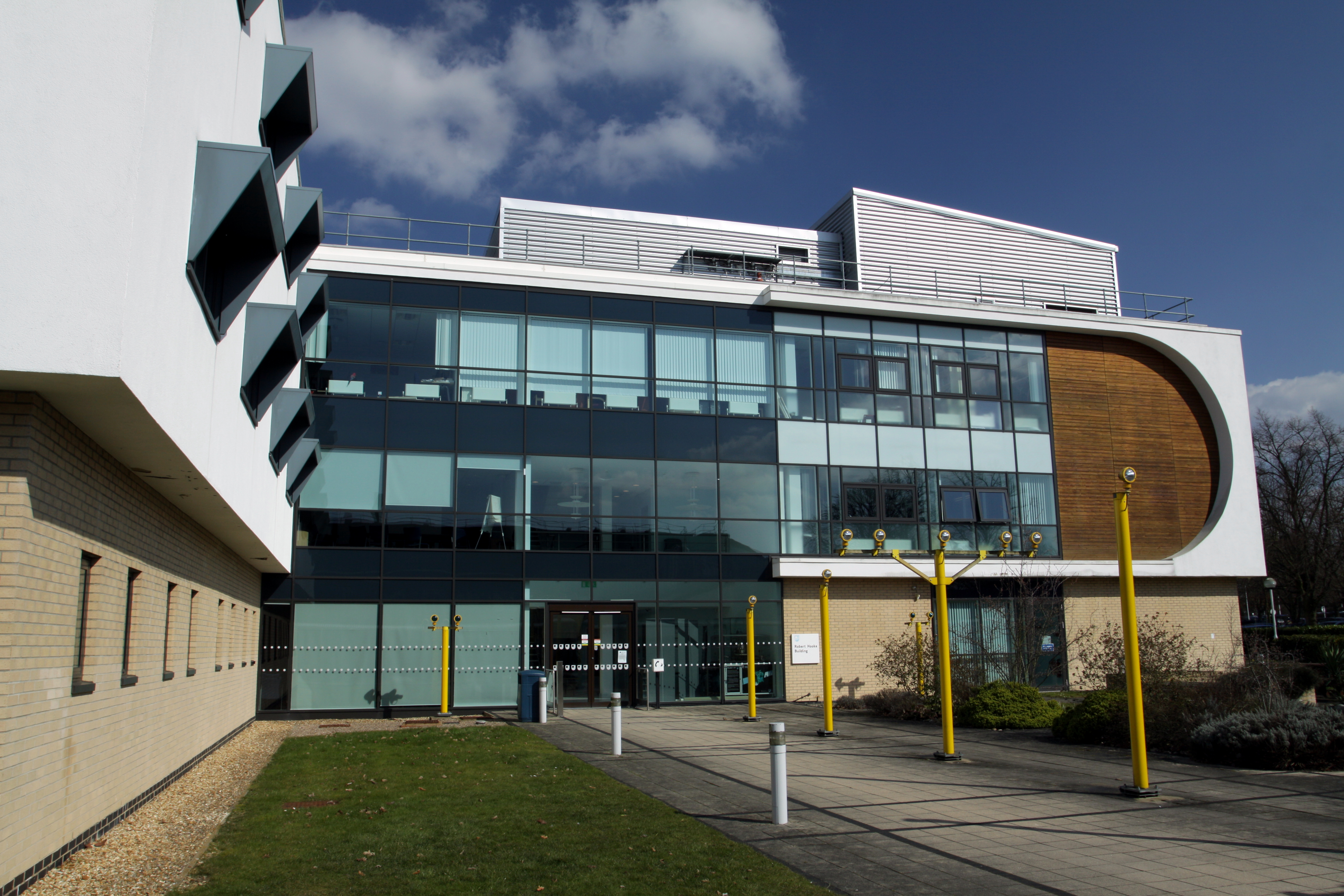
Robert Hooke building at Open University Campus in Milton Keynes

Open University modules are often assessed using an equal weighting of examinations and coursework. The coursework component normally takes the form of between two and seven tutor-marked assignments (TMAs), and may also include up to six multiple-choice or "missing word" 10-question interactive computer-marked assignments (iCMAs). The examinable component is usually an invigilated three-hour paper regardless of the size of the module (although on some modules it can be up to three three-hour papers), (Note: A 60-credit Accounting course has a three-hour paper halfway through the course, and two more three-hour papers at the end) but an increasing number of modules instead have an EMA (End of Module Assessment) which is similar to a TMA, in that it is completed at home, but is regarded as an exam for grading purposes.

Modules results are sometimes issued on a graded basis, consisting of pass grades 1 (threshold 85%, a distinction), 2 (70–84%), 3 (55–69%) & 4 (40–54%), and fail (below 40%). This grade is calculated as the lower of the overall continuous assessment score (OCAS) and overall examination score (OES).

These grades can be weighted according to their level, and combined to calculate the classification of a degree. An undergraduate degree will weigh level 3 modules twice as much as level 2, and in postgraduate programmes, all M-level modules are equally weighted.

=== Qualifications ===
==== Undergraduate ====
Open University modules have associated with them a number of Credit Accumulation and Transfer Scheme (CATS) credits – usually 30 or 60 – depending on the quantity of the material in the module and a level (1, 2, 3, or 4) corresponding to the complexity, with 120 credits roughly equating to the year of study for a full-time student.

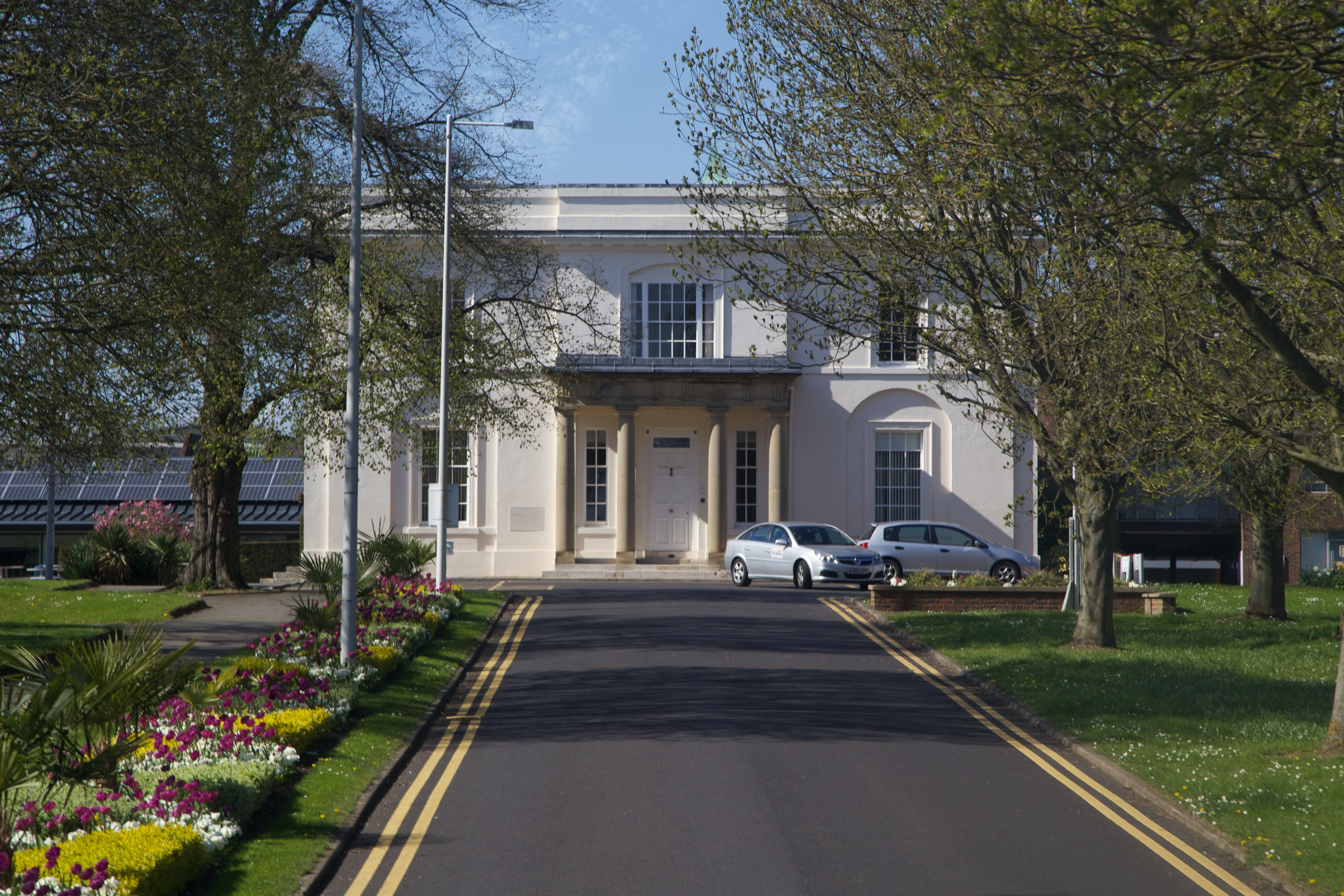
Walton Hall, Milton Keynes

The OU offers a large number of undergraduate qualifications, including certificates, diplomas, and bachelor's degrees, based on both level and quantity of study. An OU undergraduate degree requires 300 (or 360 for honours) CATS credits.

Students are generally advised not to undertake more than 60 credits per year, meaning that an undergraduate degree will take typically six years to complete. With the exception of some degrees in fast-moving areas (such as computing), there is generally no limit on the time that a student may take. Students need special permission to take more than 120 credits (equivalent to full-time study) at any time; such permission is not usually granted.

Originally the BA was the only undergraduate degree, and it was unnamed. The modern OU grants degrees of Bachelor of Arts (BA), Science (BSc), Laws (LLB) and Engineering (BEng); the BA and BSc may be named (following a specified syllabus) or unnamed (constructed of courses chosen by the student) degrees.

Many OU faculties have now introduced short modules worth ten credits. Most of these modules are taught online and start at regular intervals throughout the year. They typically provide an introduction to a broader subject over a period of ten weeks, these are generally timed during vacations at conventional universities in order to take advantage of their facilities. Some science modules, which require only home study, are complemented by residential courses, in order to allow the student to gain practical laboratory experience in that field; typically, an award of a degree or diploma will require completion of both.

Different modules are run at different times of the year, but, typically, a 30- or 60-credit undergraduate module will run from October to June, with some dual-presentation modules also running from February to October. Assessment is by both continual assessment (with, normally, between four and eight assignments during the year) and, for most, a major assignment or, on some modules, a final examination.

===== Open degree =====
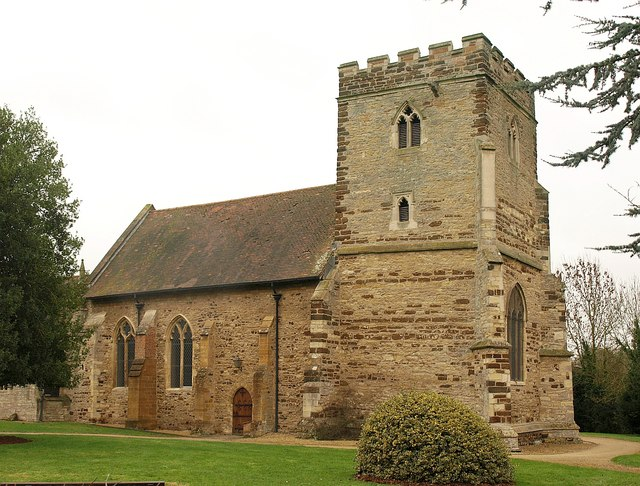
St Michael's Church at the Open University campus

As well as degrees in named subjects, the Open University also grants multidisciplinary "Open" degrees. Open degrees provide students with access to a wide variety of subjects to develop a personalised curriculum to meet their vocational needs and personal interests. The Open degree may be awarded as a Bachelor of Arts Open, a Bachelor of Science Open (either with or without honours), a Master of Arts Open or a Master of Science Open.

The Open degree is the most popular qualification at the university, followed by BSc (Hons) Psychology; Cert of HE in Psychology; Bachelor of Laws (Hons); and BA (Hons) Business Management. Around 20,000 students are enrolled on the Open degree, which makes the Open University the UK's largest multidisciplinary education provider. As of 2018, over 236,000 alumni have graduated with an Open degree, and in 2019, the Open University celebrated its 50th anniversary; as did its flagship Open Programme.

===== Other qualifications =====
The Open University grants undergraduate Certificates (abbreviated Cert) typically awarded after 120 completed credits at Level 1 (where each credit corresponds to roughly 10 hours of study, therefore 120 credits represent about 1200 hours of effort), Diplomas (abbreviated Dip) after 240 credits – typically 120 credits at Level 1, and 120 credits at Level 2. Open University also awards Foundation degrees (abbreviated FD).

OU also offers a limited number of CertHE (120 CATS) and DipHE (240 CATS).

==== Postgraduate ====
The Open University provides the opportunity to study for a PhD on a part-time distance, or a full-time basis (on-site for science subjects and most social sciences, off-site with some supervisions on-site for arts) in a wide range of disciplines as well as an EdD for professionals in education. Since 2019, the Open University has also offered a professional doctorate for healthcare workers. The university offers a range of Master's levels modules such as the MBA and MPA, MSc, MA and MEd, and MRes, and a number of postgraduate diplomas and certificates including innovative practice-based modules and postgraduate computing qualifications for professionals. Postgraduate certificates are awarded for 120 credits of study on specified modules; postgraduate diplomas are awarded for 240 credits of study on specified modules. The university offers "Advanced Diplomas" that involve 60 credits at the undergraduate level and 60 credits at the postgraduate level – these are designed as "bridges" between undergraduate and postgraduate study.

Its master's degrees in the field of engineering are accredited to support registration as a Chartered Engineer, the highest level of engineering professional registration in the United Kingdom.

=== Degree ceremonies ===
The Open University holds its annual degree ceremony at The Barbican Centre in London.

Unlike most United Kingdom universities, degree ceremonies at the Open University are not graduation ceremonies as such (the occasion on which degrees are formally conferred on those who have achieved substantive degrees)—although honours degrees are also normally conferred on these occasions. The Open University degree ceremony is officially known as a "Presentation of Graduates" at which those who have already had a degree bestowed on them are presented to the University Chancellor or his/her representative. Open University graduates normally graduate in absentia at a joint meeting of the university's council and senate ("congregation") which takes place at a meeting entirely separate from the degree ceremony.

The university's degree ceremonies occur throughout the year at various prestigious auditorium venues located throughout England, as well as in Scotland, Wales, Northern Ireland, and the Republic of Ireland, including London, Manchester, Birmingham, Ely, Glasgow, Cardiff, Belfast and Dublin. In the year 2018 the OU held 29 degree ceremonies in total. These ceremonies are presided over by a senior academic at the Pro-Vice-Chancellor level or higher, and have the normal formal rituals associated with a graduation ceremony, including academic dress, procession and university mace.

==== Academic dress ====
Academic dress for the Open University is based on the colours blue and gold (yellow). No headwear is worn at degree ceremonies.

Open University academic dress
Degree	Gown	Hood
Doctor of Education	Royal blue, 3-inch gold facings	Full shape, gold Panama, lined light blue
Doctor of Letters	Royal blue, 5-inch gold facings	Full shape, gold, lined royal blue
Doctor of Philosophy	Royal blue, 3-inch gold facings	Full shape, royal blue, lined gold, edged 1-inch gold
Doctor of Science	Royal blue, 5-inch gold facings	Full shape, gold, lined light blue
Master of Philosophy	Light blue	Full shape, light blue, edged gold
Master of Research	Light blue	Simple shape, royal blue, faced 3-inch golf
Master of Science	Light blue	Full shape, dark blue, lined gold, edged 1/2-inch gold
Master of Arts	Light blue	Full shape, dark blue, lined gold, edged 1/2-inch gold
Master of Business Administration	Light blue	Full shape, dark blue, lined gold with a blue edge, edged 1-inch gold
Master of Education	Light blue	Full shape, dark blue, lined gold with a 1-inch white edge on a cowl, edged 3/8-inch gold on cape
Master of Engineering Master of Mathematics	Light blue	Full shape, gold, faced 3-inch inside light blue
Bachelor of Arts Bachelor of Science Bachelor of Engineering Bachelor of Laws	Dark blue	Simple shape, light blue, faced 3-inch gold
Foundation degree	Dark blue	Simple shape, light blue, faced 3-inch dark blue

In 2000, the Open University was the first to host an online virtual graduation ceremony in the United Kingdom together with an audience at the OU's campus in Milton Keynes. Twenty-six students from eight countries were bestowed their master's degrees in an online graduation ceremony, including, from the Massachusetts Institute of Technology (MIT), Tim Berners-Lee, one of the founders of the World Wide Web, who was conferred an honorary doctorate.

University rankings

Global – Overall
- ARWU World: 901–1000 (2025)
- THE World: 801–1000 (2026)
- USNWR Global: 718 (2021)

Regional – Overall
- USNWR Europe: 308 (2022)

National – Overall
- ARWU National: 59-61 (2025)
- CWUR National: 51 (2022)
- USNWR National: 51 (2021)
- TEF England: Gold (2023)

=== Rankings ===
The university is included in major world university rankings such as Times Higher Education World University Rankings, U.S. News & World Report and Academic Ranking of World Universities.

The OU ranked in the top third of UK universities in the Research Excellence Framework (REF) 2014 using the Times Higher Education Power Score.

The Open University ranked third in National Student Survey 2021 achieving 88.24% for overall student satisfaction.

=== Research ===
Like other UK universities, the OU actively engages in research. The OU's Planetary and Space Sciences Research Institute has become particularly well known to the public through its involvement in space missions. In October 2006, the Cassini-Huygens mission including 15 people from the OU received the 2006 "Laurels for Team Achievement Award" from the International Academy of Astronautics (IAA). Cassini-Huygens' successful completion of its seven-year, two billion-mile journey in January 2005 to Saturn ended with Huygens landing farther away from Earth than any previous probe or craft in the history of space exploration. The first instrument to touch Saturn's moon Titan was the Surface Science Package containing nine sensors to investigate the physical properties of Titan's surface. It was built by a team at the OU led by Professor John Zarnecki.

The OU employs over 500 people engaged in research in over 25 areas, and there are over 1,200 research students. It spends approximately £20 million each year on research, around £6 million from the Higher Education Funding Council for England, and the remainder from external funders.

The Open University also runs the Open Research Online (ORO) website. ORO is a collection of over 40,000 open-access research outputs across a broad range of research areas.

The Open University produced in collaboration with Springer Nature the Computer Science Ontology, which is a large-scale automatically generated taxonomy of research topics in the field of computer science.

=== OpenScience Observatories ===
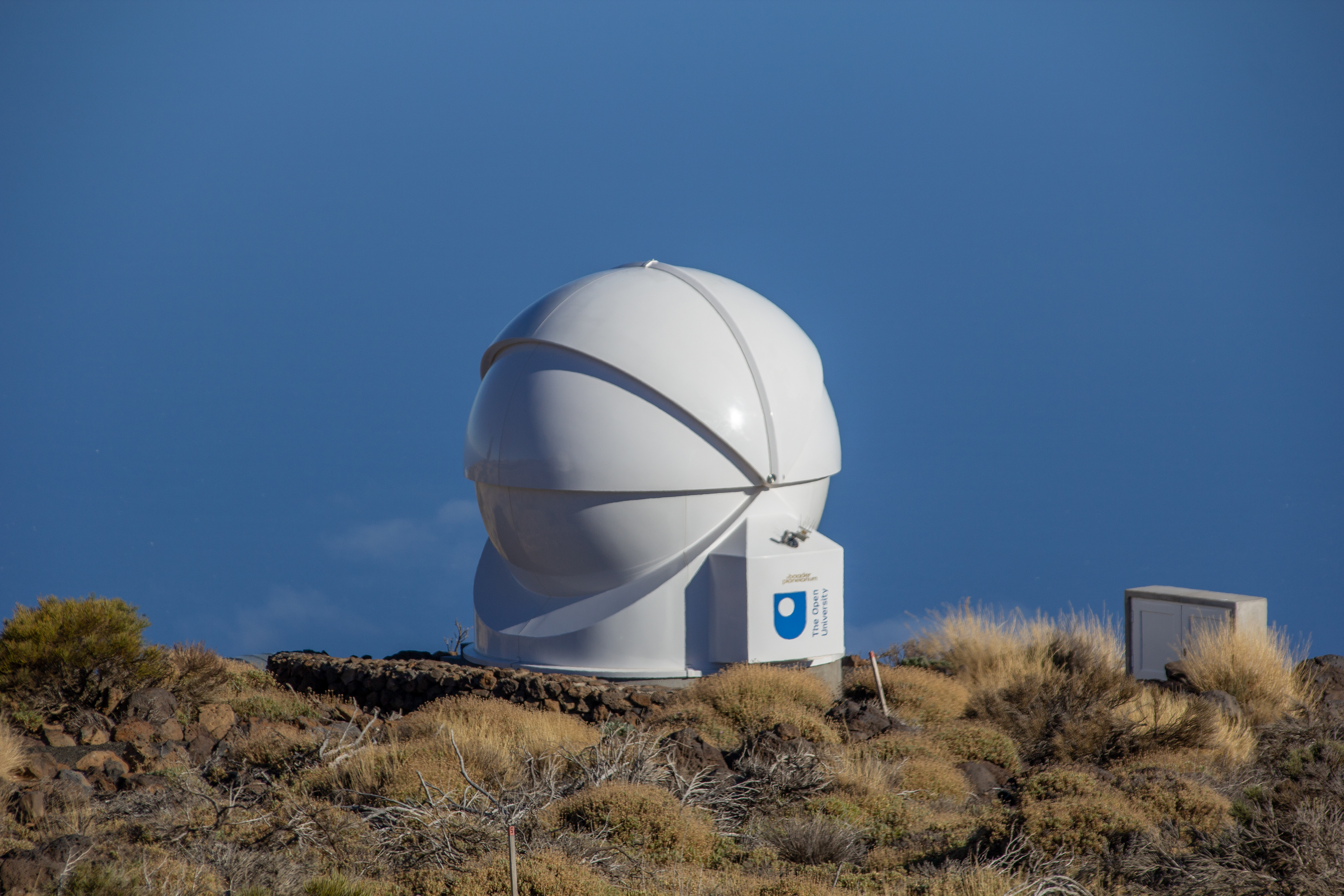
The Open University operates a collection of telescopes and other instruments at the Observatorio del Teide, Tenerife, Spain.

The university operates a collection of telescopes and other instruments at the Observatorio del Teide, Tenerife. Its facilities comprise the COmpletely Autonomous Service Telescope (COAST), the Physics Innovations Robotic Telescope Explorer (PIRATE) and an associated weather station.

== Students ==
In the 2022/23 academic year, there were 199,391 enrolled students.

=== Demographics ===
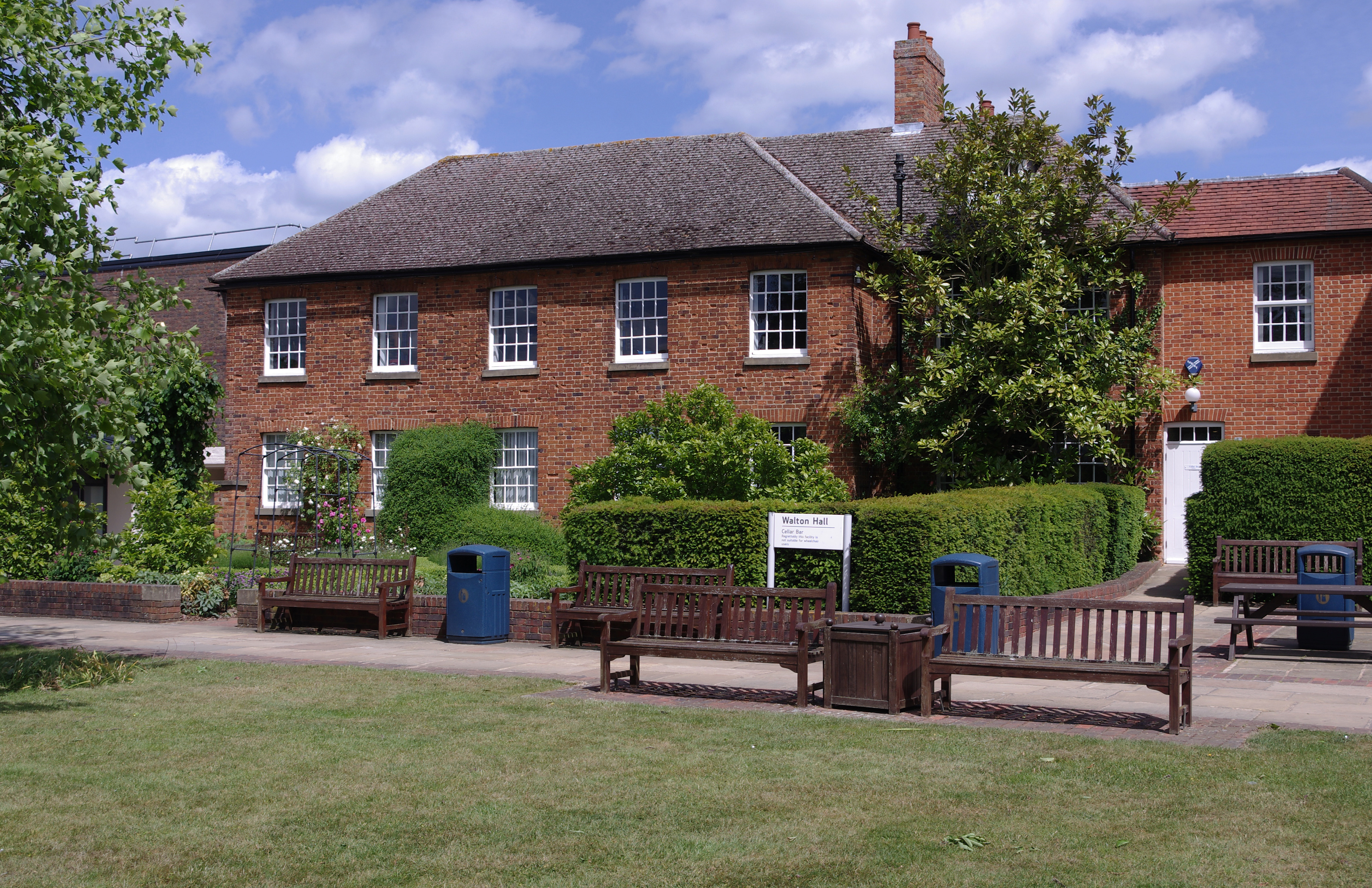
The Open University's Milton Keynes campus

In 2022/23, 99,815 students were from England, 19,715 were from Scotland, 14,998 from Wales, 7,204 from Northern Ireland and 5,657 from the European Union, with others elsewhere. 56% of undergraduates were female, with 25% of those taking postgraduate modules being male.

According to The Guardian, a cross-sector fall in the number of part-time students was accelerated in 2012 when tuition fees rose and there was limited financial support for part-time students. The Open University saw a 30% drop in part-time students between 2010/11 and 2015/16. Enrollment numbers show a tremendous difference from 2009/10 to 2016/17.

While most of those studying are mature students, an increasingly large proportion of new undergraduates are aged between 17 and 25, to the extent that in 2010/11 the OU had more students in this age range than any other UK university. In the 2003/04 academic year around 20% of new undergraduates were under 25, up from 12.5% in 1996/97 (the year before top-up fees were announced). In 2010, approximately 55% of those under 25 were in full-time employment. and 29,000 undergraduates were in this age range. By 2011, 32,000 undergraduates were under 25 years old, representing around 25% of all new students. The majority of students in the 2022/23 academic year were aged between 25 and 34 years old, with the median age of new undergraduates being 29.

As of 2014, the OU's youngest graduate was a fifteen-year-old boy from Wales who gained a BSc with First Class Honours in 2014.

The OU works with some schools to introduce A-Level students to OU study and in 2009/10 3% of undergraduates were under 18 years old.

=== Courses ===
Unlike other universities, where students register for a programme, OU students register separately for individual modules (which may be 30 or 60 CATS credits (and formerly available in 10, 15, or 20 credits), equivalent to 15 or 30 ECTS credits). These modules may then be linked to degree programmes.

During the 2022/23 academic year, biological and physical sciences was the most popular study area (with 18,967 full-time equivalent students), followed by social studies (13,830) and mathematical sciences, computer sciences and engineering & technology studies (13,687). The most popular module during 2022/23 was DE100 - Investigating psychology 1 (8,048 students), followed by DD102 - Introducing the social sciences, E102 - Introduction to childhood studies and child psychology, TM111 - Introduction to computing and information technology 1 and B100 - An introduction to business and management.

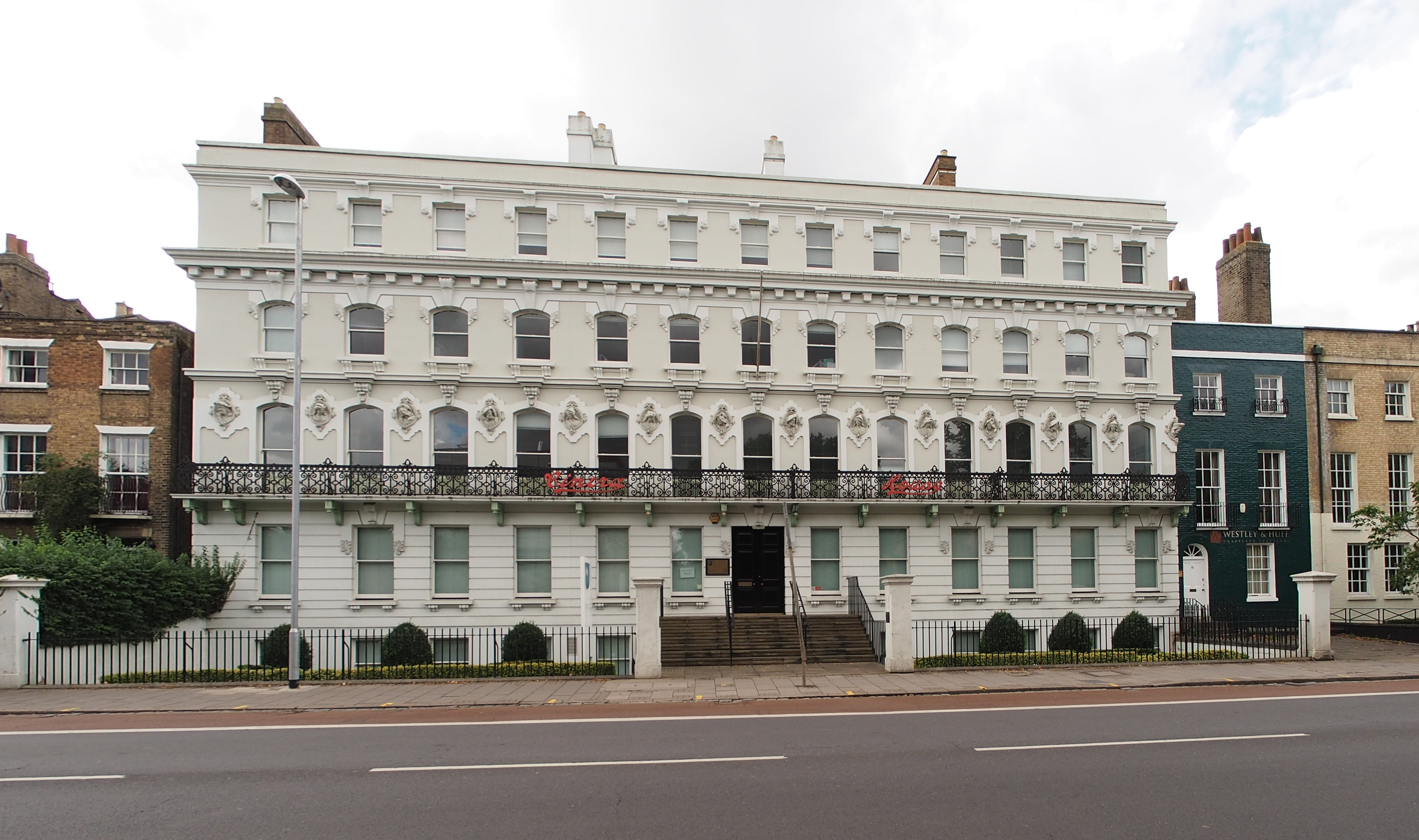
Cintra House, Cambridge, the university's former base in the East of England

=== Fees and financial assistance ===
13,014 students received financial assistance for their studies in 2022/23. The typical cost for United Kingdom-based students of a Bachelor's honours degree at the OU was between £3,780 and £5,130 in 2009/10. From September 2012, the Government reduced its funding for all students residing in England and fees went up to compensate. English students pay higher fees than those living in the rest of the United Kingdom. The average cost of one full-time year or 120 credits rose to £6,336 in 2021, bringing the cost of an average Bachelor's honours degree for an English student to £19,008. (European Union and international students pay more as the university does not receive government funding for them). The most important revenue stream to the Open University is now academic fees paid by the students, which totalled about £157 million in 2009/10 and £397.2 million in 2022/23.

=== Qualifications awarded ===
The university enrolled fewer than 50,000 students in the 1970/71 academic year, but it quickly exceeded that number by 1974/75. By 1987/88, yearly enrolment had doubled to 100,000 students, passing 200,000 by 2001/02 and 250,000 in 2009/10. Numbers fell when the fee regime changed.

Cumulatively, by the end of 2009/10, the OU had educated more than 1.5 million students and awarded 819,564 qualifications after successful assessment.

In addition, the Open University provides certification for qualifications at Ruskin College in Oxford and Richmond, the American International University in London, a private liberal arts institution. (Until 2008, it provided the same service for the University of the Highlands and Islands in Scotland).

=== Students' Union ===
Whilst the governance bye-laws gives its name as the "Open University Students Association", the Students' Union recently rebranded itself as Open SU.

As a union, it represents the students at the Open University and is a registered charity wholly funded by the university. The Students' Union is governed by a Board of Trustees, made up of internal students and external members, and a Student Leadership Team who are elected on a bi-yearly basis. The current team runs from 2026 to 2028. Each student registered with the OU automatically becomes part of the Students' Union unless they elect to formally opt out. It offers opportunities to meet up, volunteer, find information and access services to support learning along with a range of student clubs and societies typical of those found in other UK Universities.

As of 2024, the current President was Natalie Baker and the Deputy President was Andrew Wilson.

The newly elected President for 2026-28 period is Scarlet James and Deputy President is Kirsten Munro

== Notable current and former academics ==
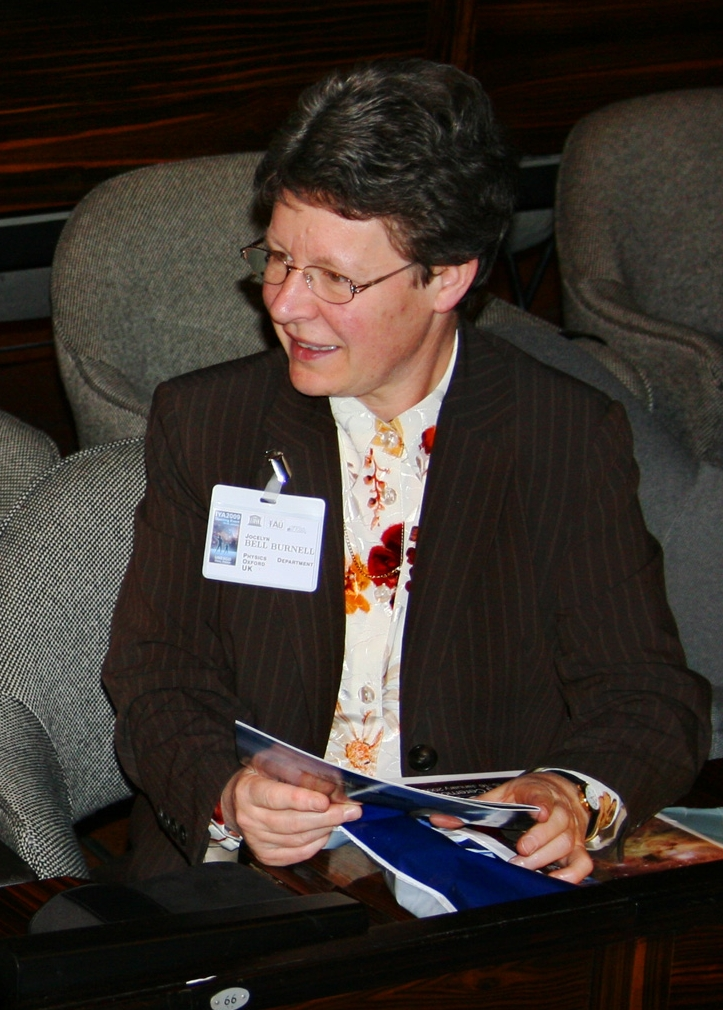
Jocelyn Bell Burnell led the physics department at the OU for 10 years.

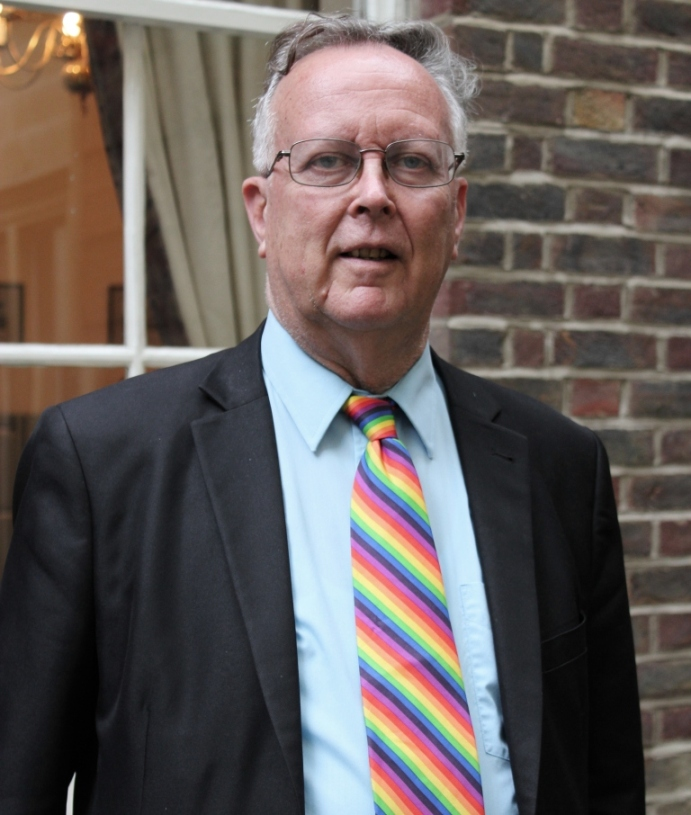
Robin Wilson is an emeritus professor in the Department of Mathematics.

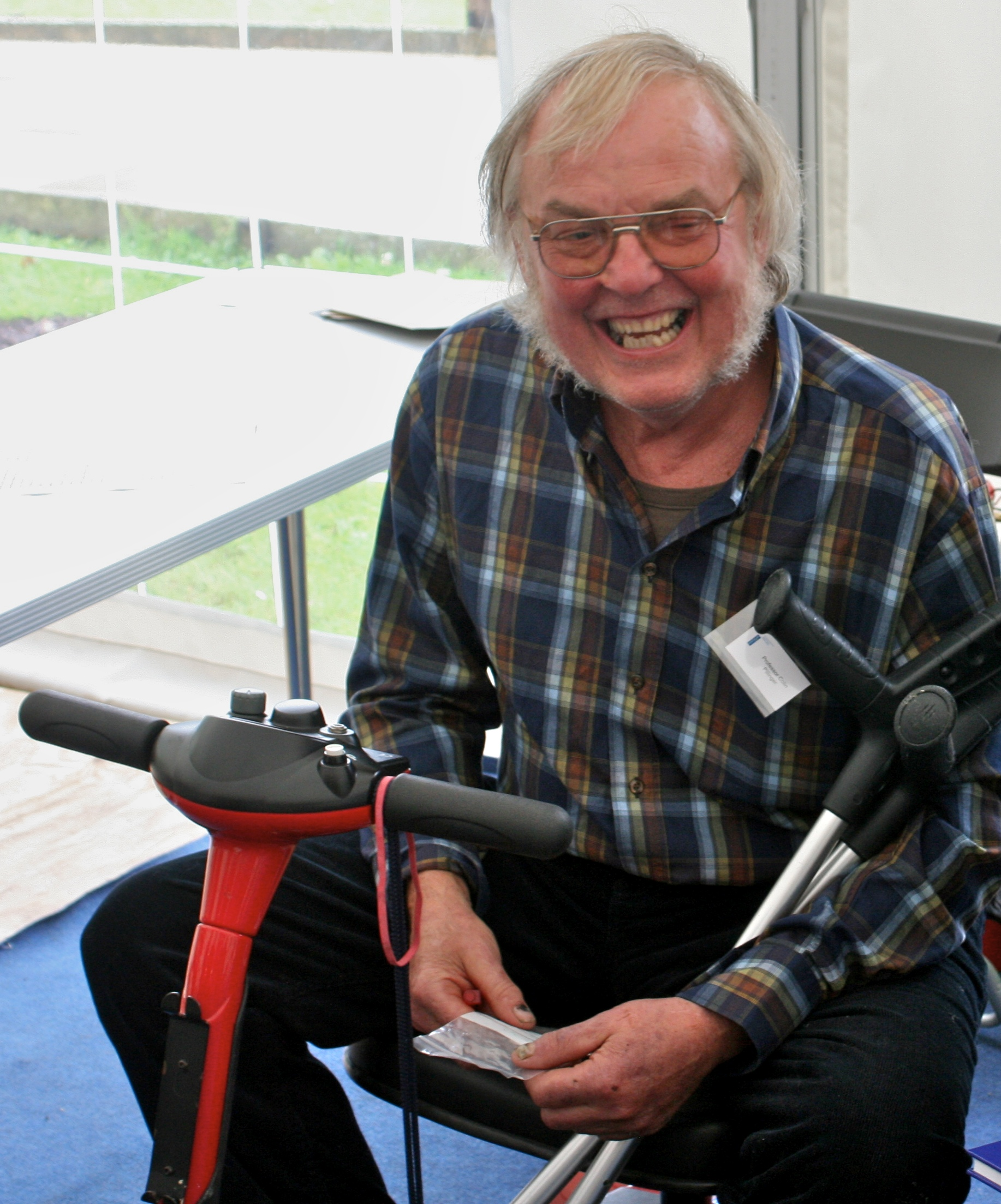
Colin Pillinger was a founding member of the Planetary and Space Sciences Research Institute at OU.

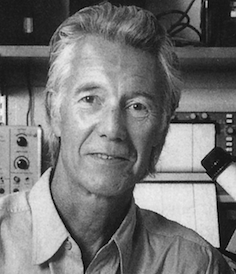
Brian Goodwin worked as a professor of biology at the OU until his retirement in 1992.

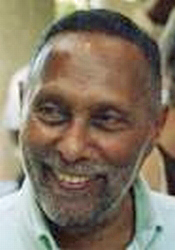
Stuart Hall was a professor of sociology at the OU for 18 years until his retirement in 1997.
- Jocelyn Bell Burnell – astronomer
- Tim Benton – art historian
- Andrew Blowers – geographer
- Neil Chalmers – zoologist
- Catherine Cooke – architectural historian
- Nigel Cross – design researcher
- Katharine Ellis – music historian
- Dimitra Fimi – Tolkien scholar
- Monica Grady – meteoricist
- Brian Goodwin – biologist
- David Gow – composer
- Norman Gowar – mathematician
- Oswald Hanfling – philosopher
- Stuart Hall – social scientist
- Christopher Hill – historian
- Arthur Marwick – historian
- Doreen Massey – geographer
- Bob Moon – educationist
- John Naughton – technologist
- Oliver Penrose – mathematician
- Mike Pentz – physicist
- Colin Pillinger – planetary scientist
- Steven Rose – biologist
- David Gordon Scott - criminologist
- Russell Stannard – physicist
- Hilary Wainwright – sociologist
- Nigel Warburton – philosopher
- Clare Warren – geologist
- Margaret Wetherell – social psychologist
- Glenn White – astronomer
- Robin Wilson – mathematician
- John Zarnecki – space scientist

== Notable alumni and honorees ==
=== Alumni ===
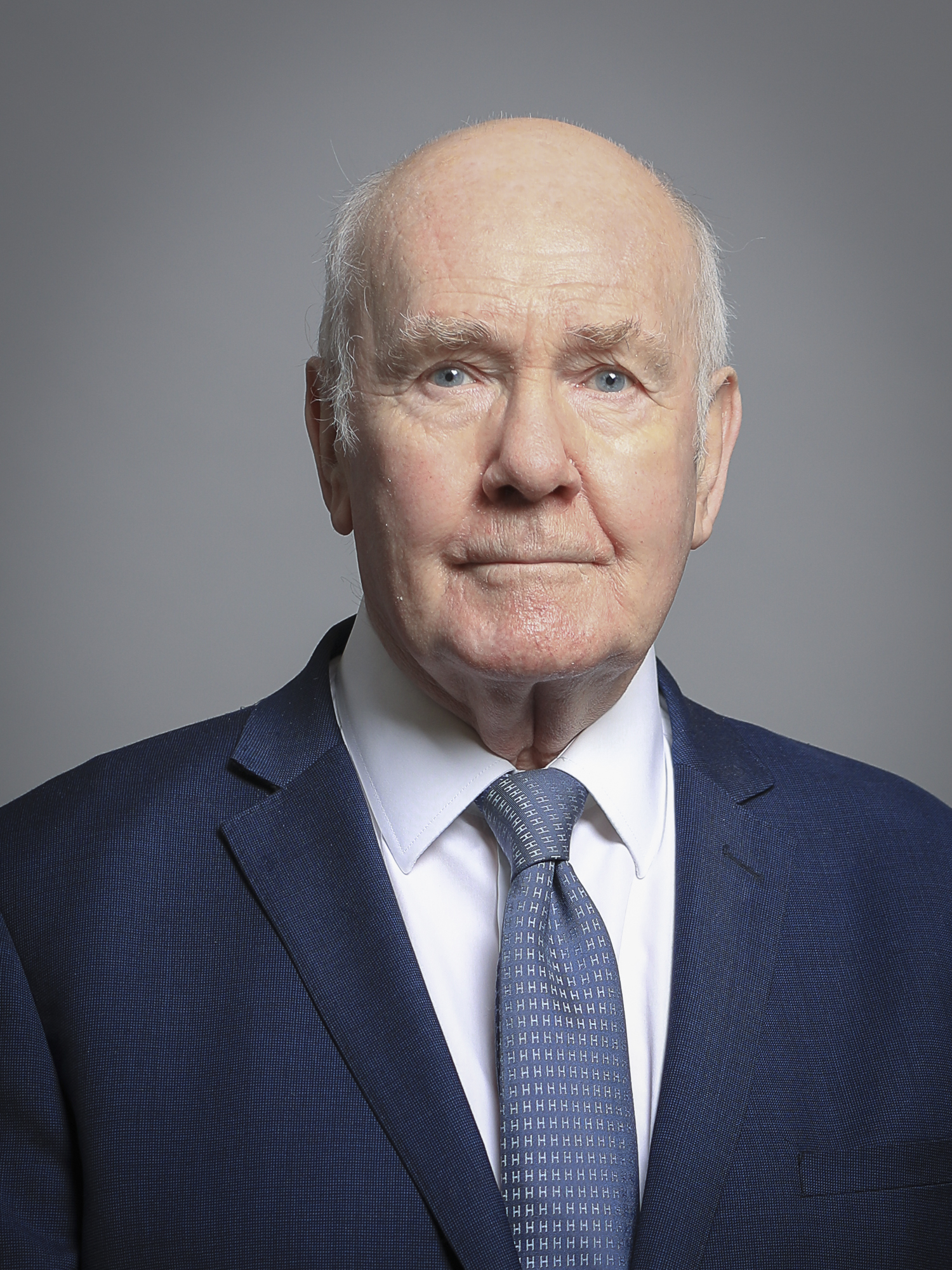
Lord Reid, former Home Secretary and Minister

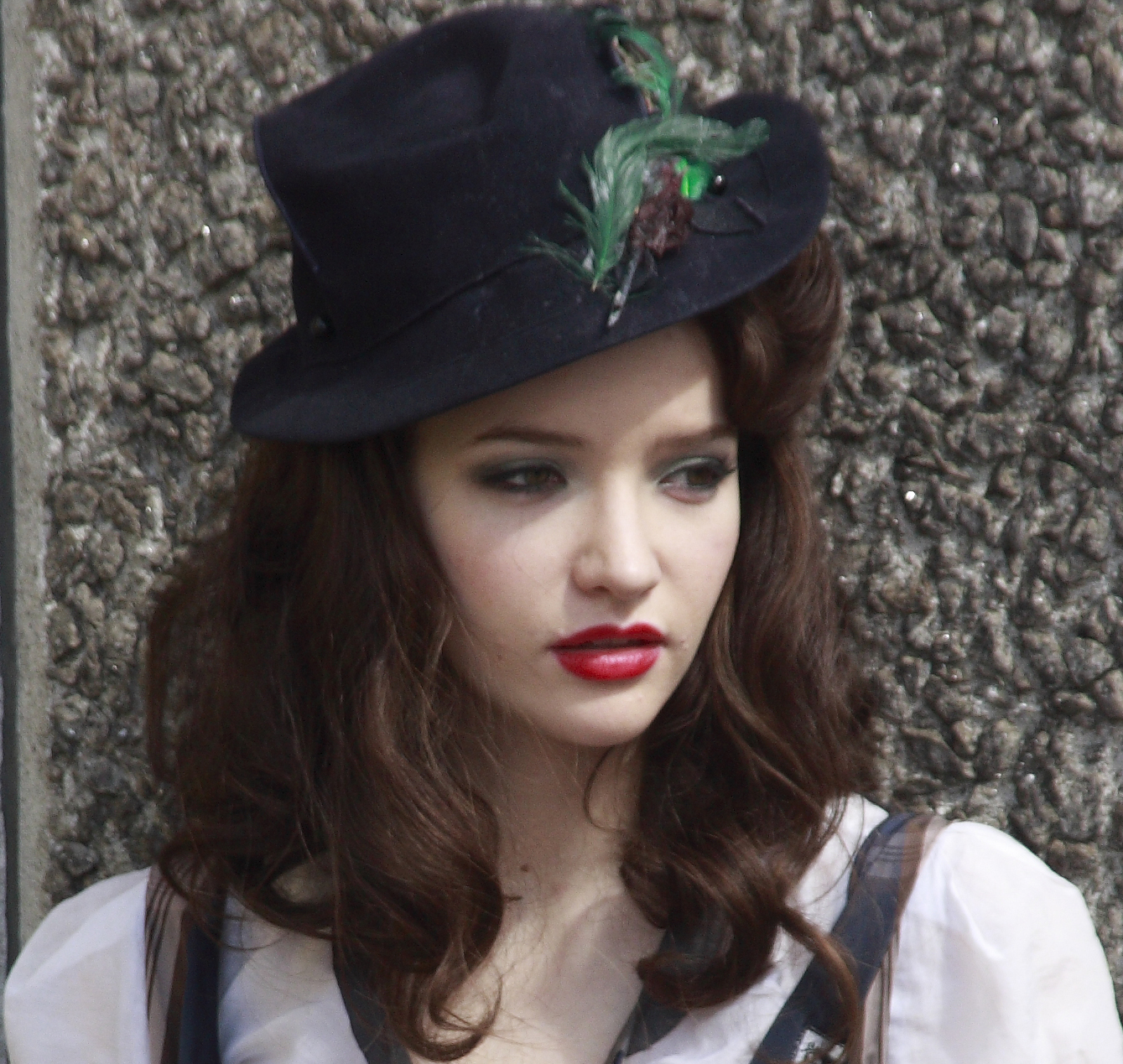
Actress Talulah Riley received a degree in Natural Sciences

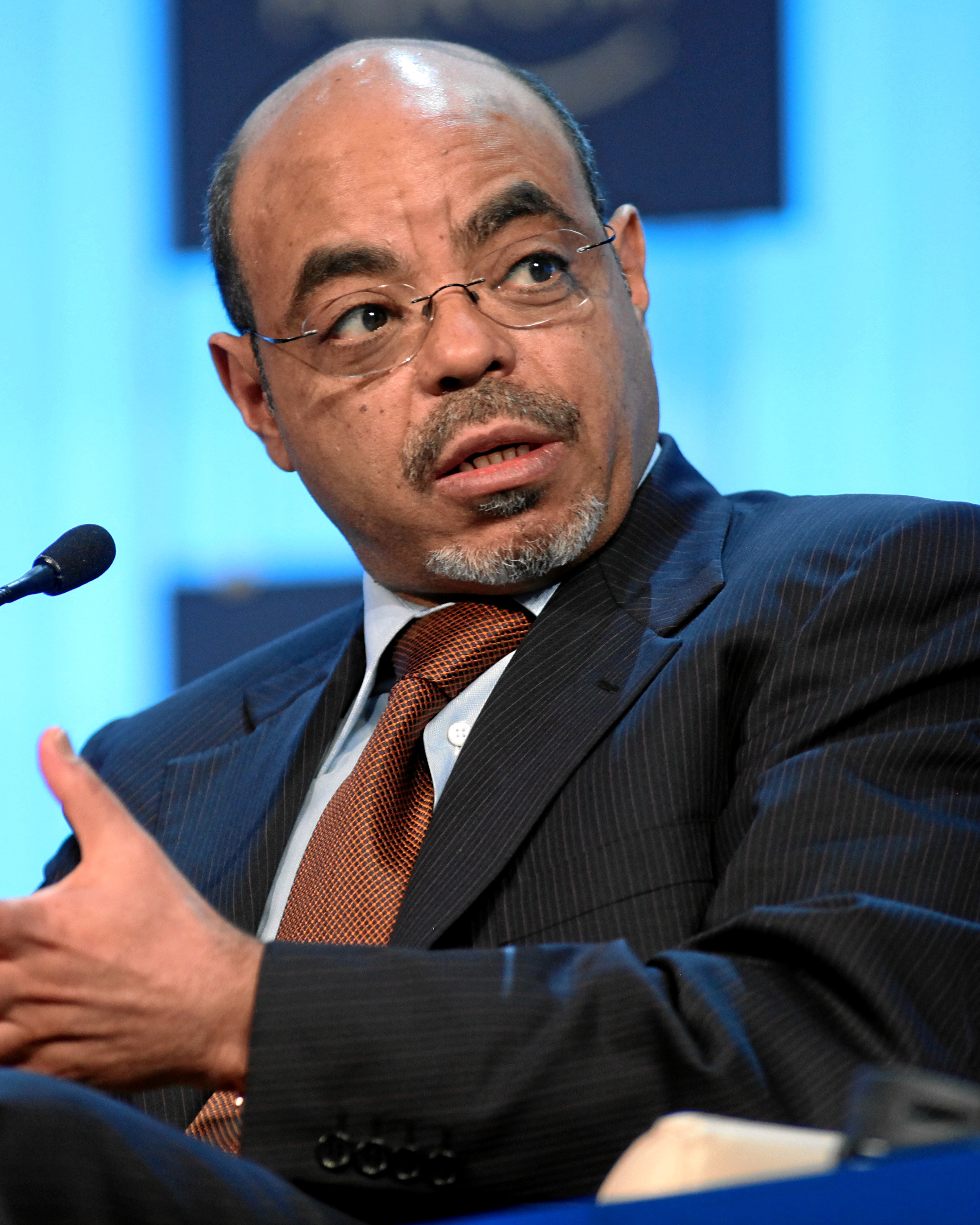
Meles Zenawi – former President and Prime Minister of Ethiopia (MBA 1995)

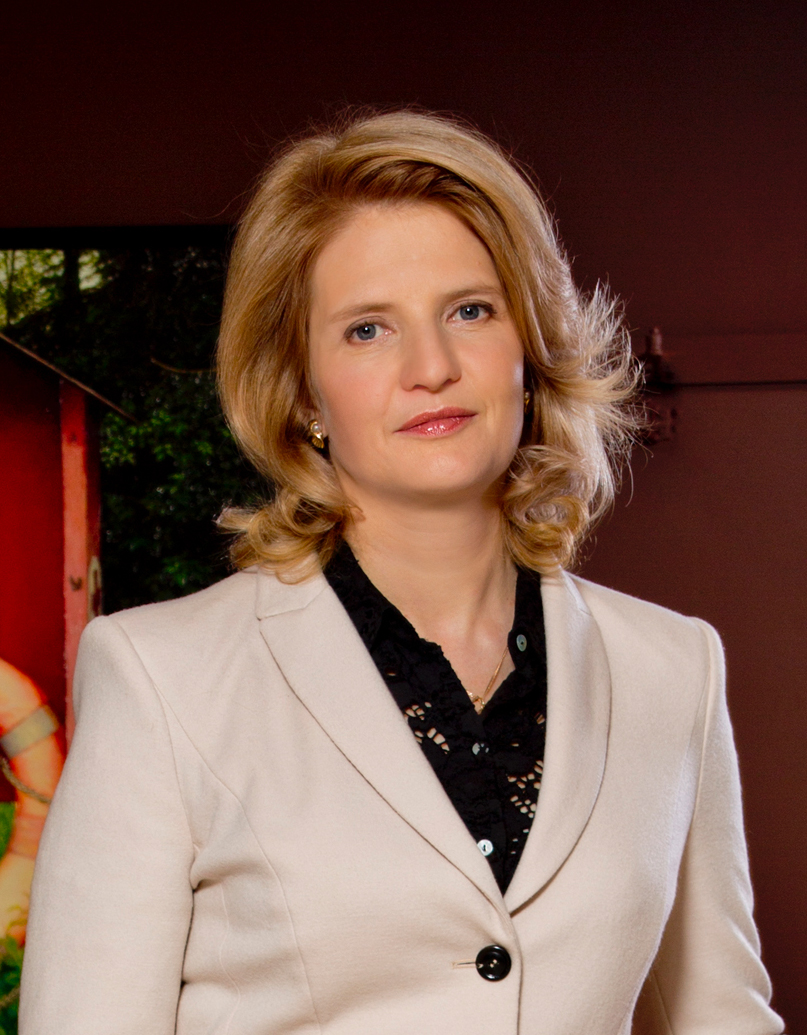
Natalya Kaspersky, Russian entrepreneur and co-founder of software company Kaspersky Lab (BA)

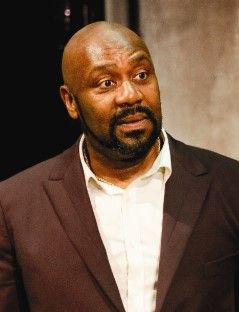
Sir Lenny Henry – comedian and actor (BA Hons in English Literature)

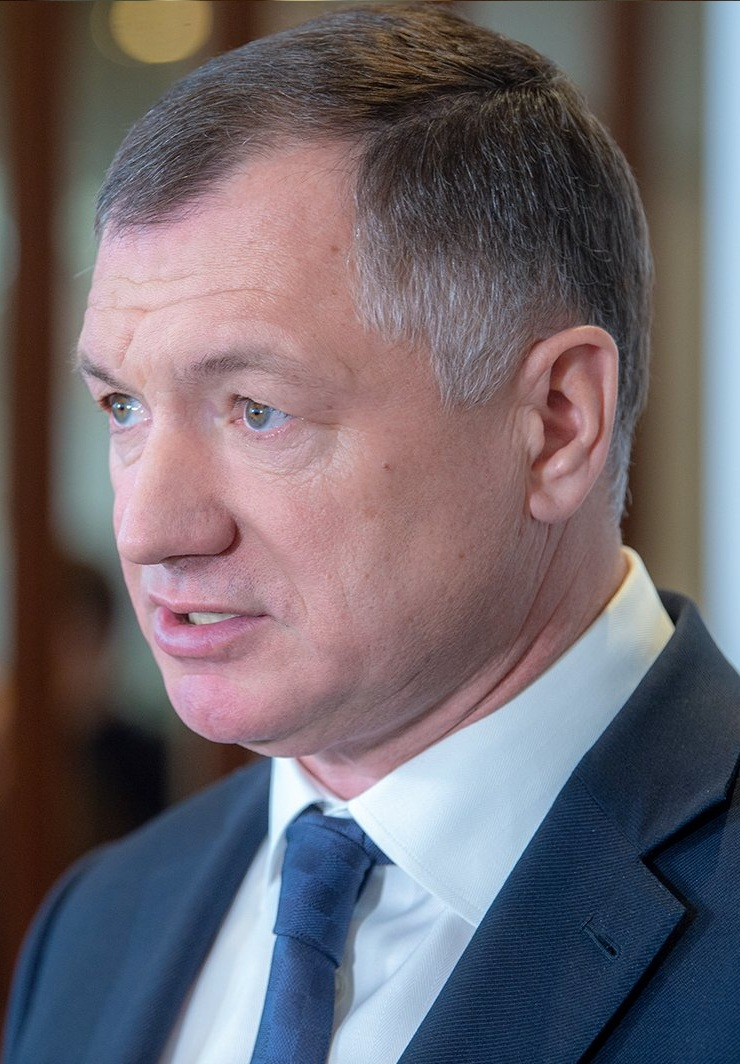
Marat Khusnullin – Deputy Prime Minister of Russia graduated with a degree in management

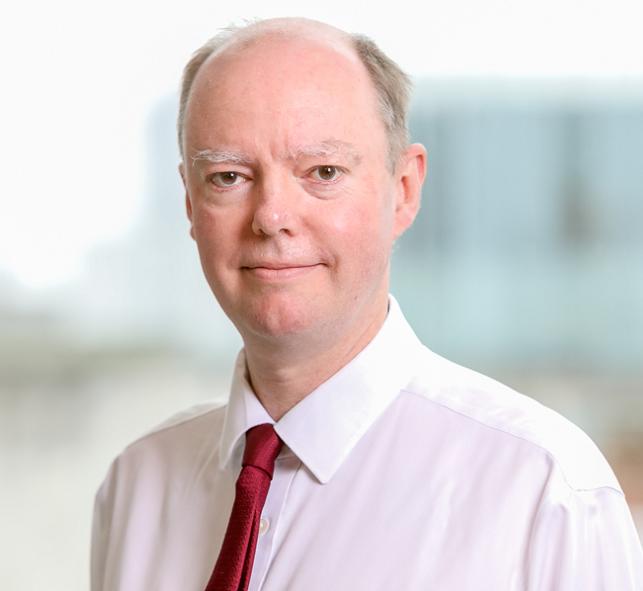
Chris Whitty, Chief Medical Officer for England (GrDip in economics)

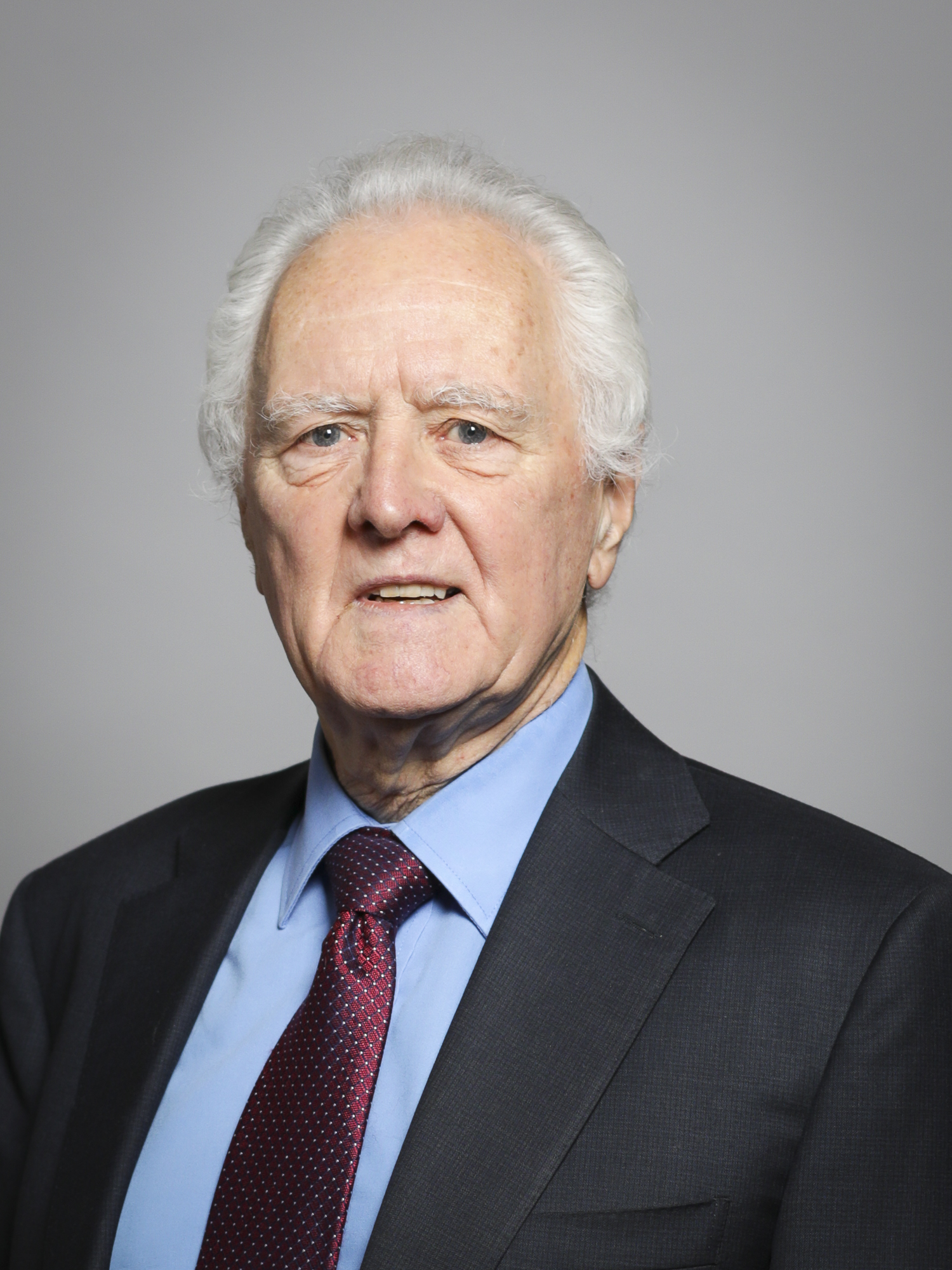
Lord McFall, Scottish politician and Lord Speaker (BA Education and Philosophy)

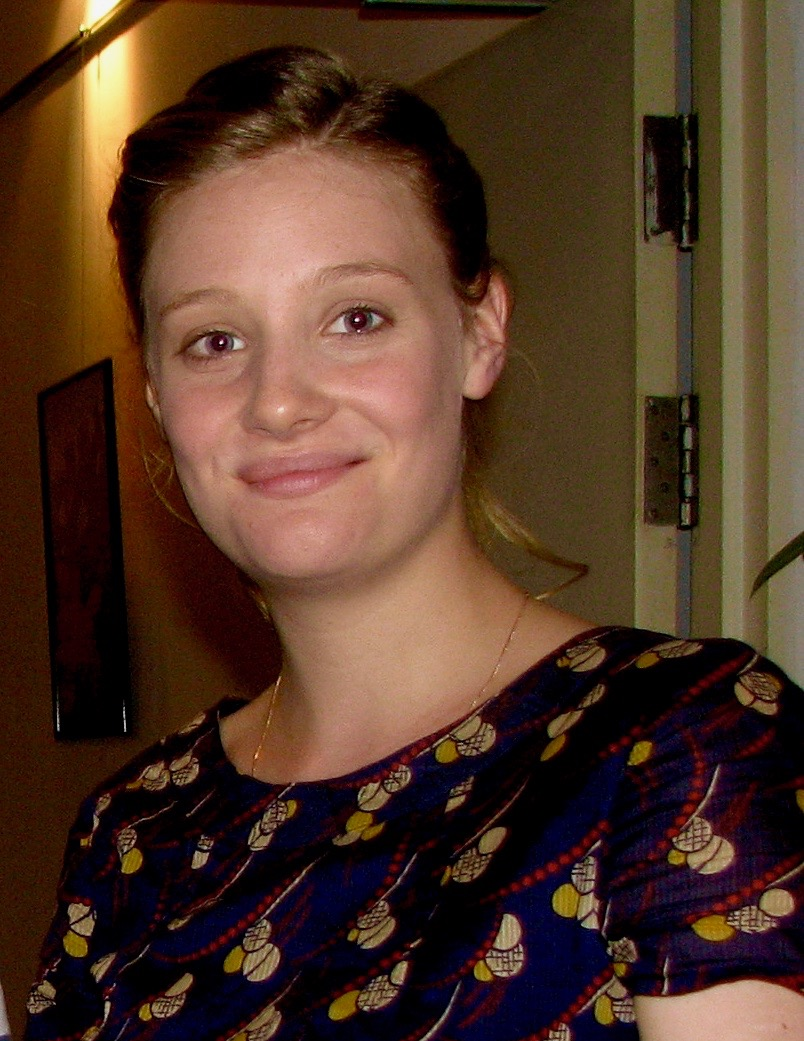
Romola Garai, British actress and film director (BA English literature)

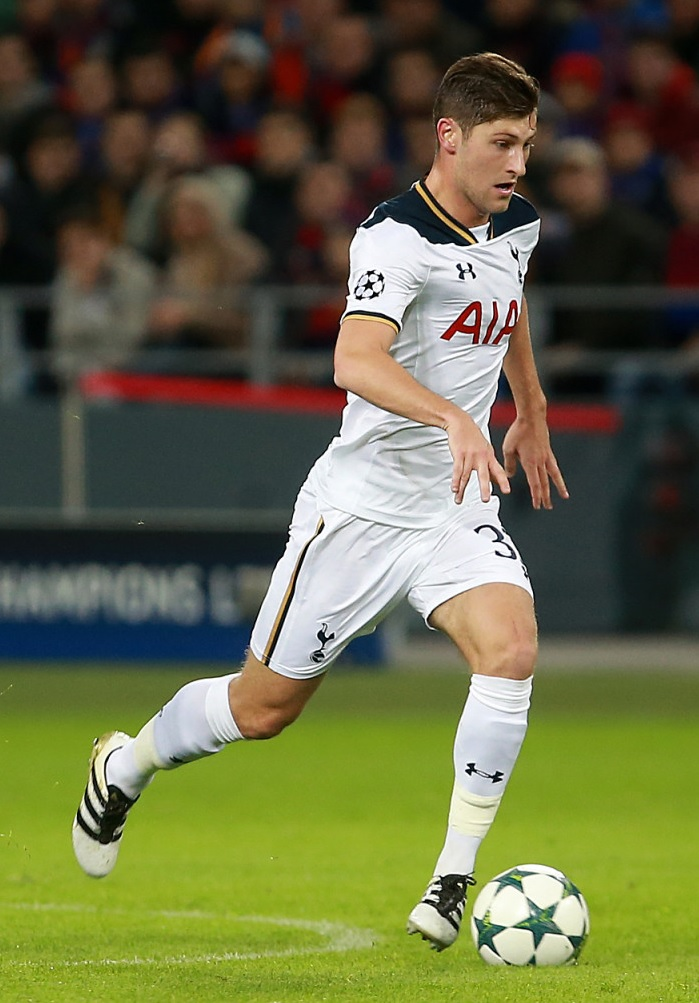
Ben Davies, Welsh Footballer (2:1 degree in Economics and Business)

=== Honorary graduates ===
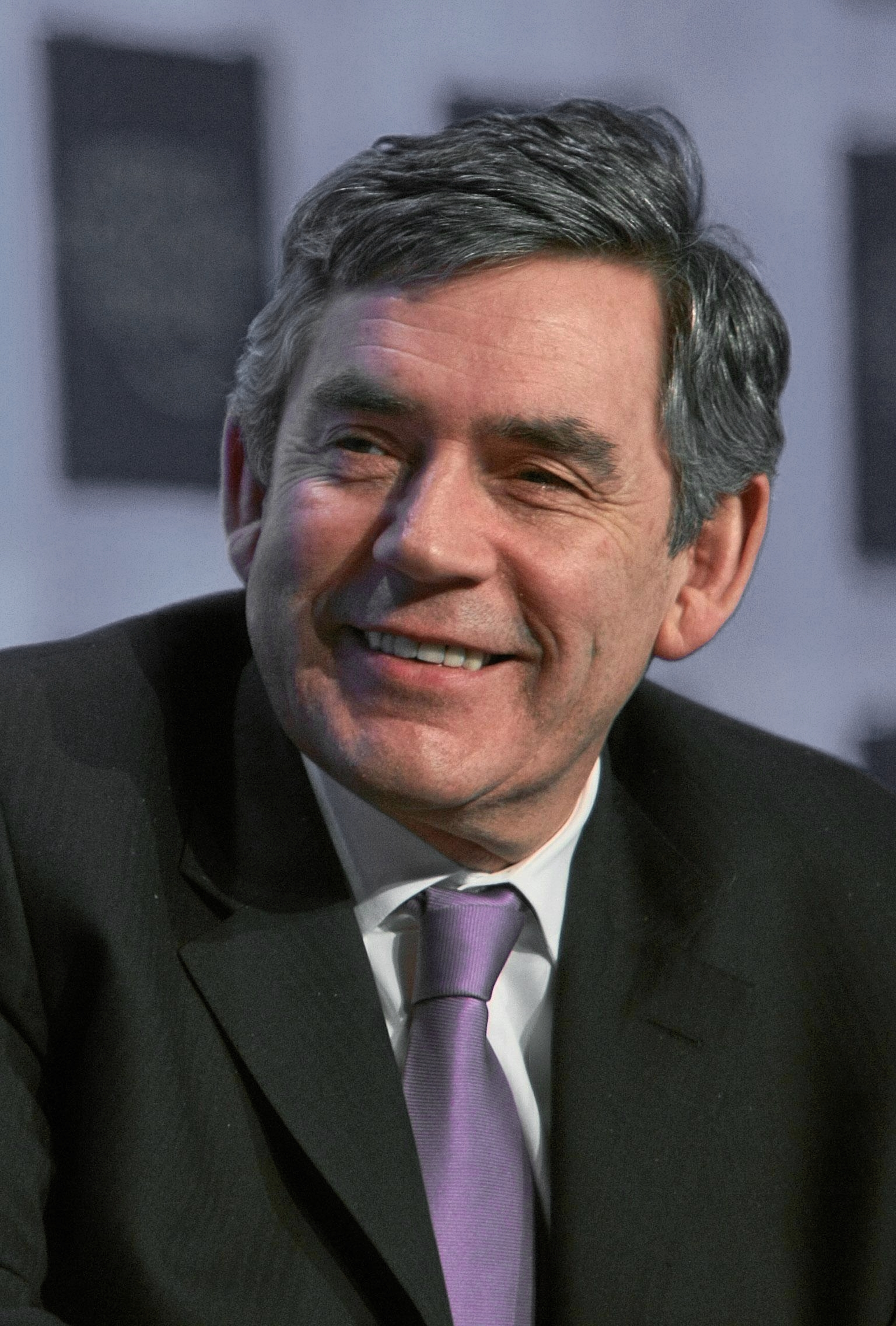
Gordon Brown, former UK Prime Minister and OU tutor, received an honorary doctorate from the Open University.

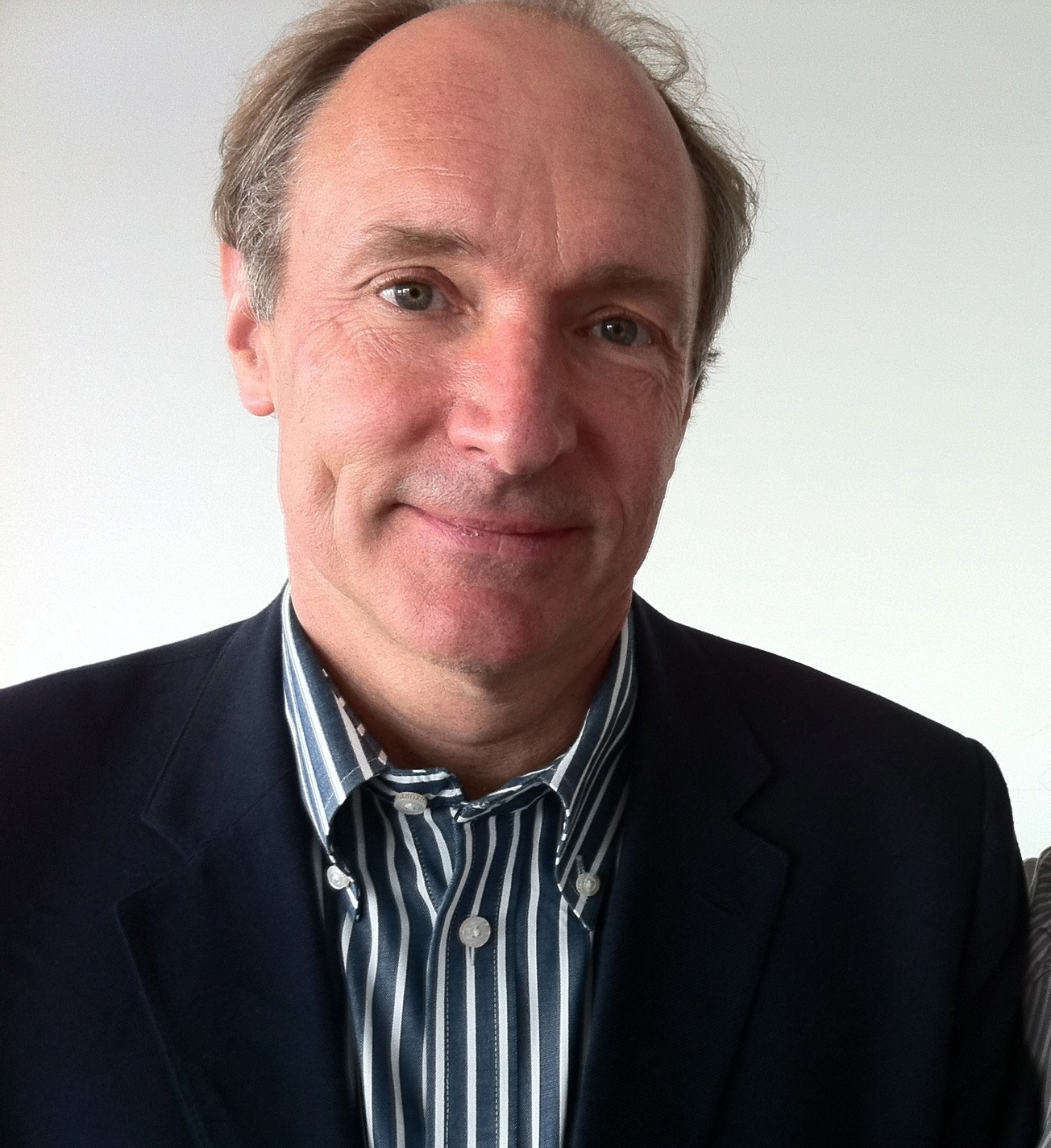
Tim Berners-Lee – inventor of the World Wide Web and recipient of OU honorary doctorate.

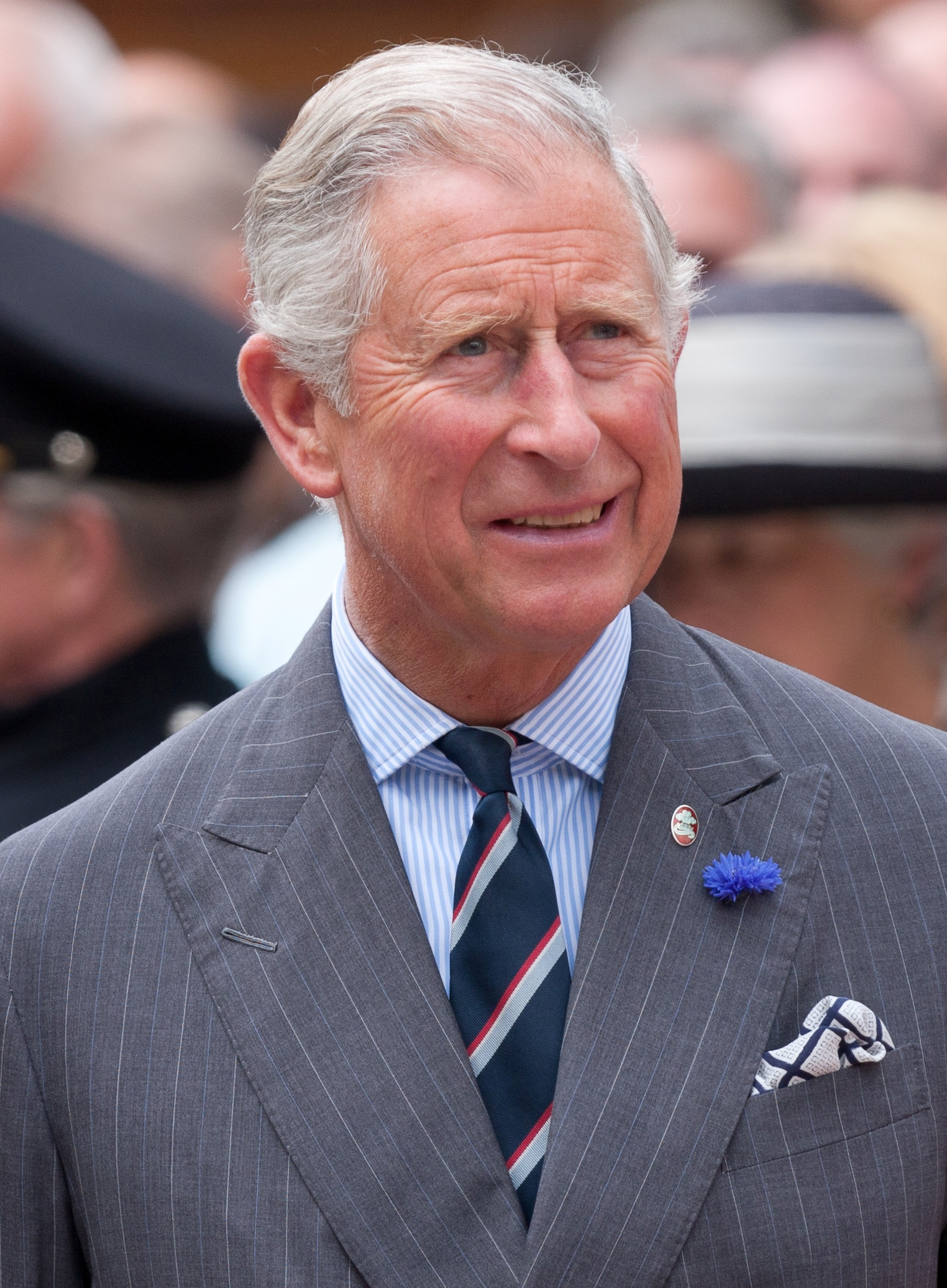
King Charles III (then Prince Charles) received an Honorary Degree from the OU in 1982.

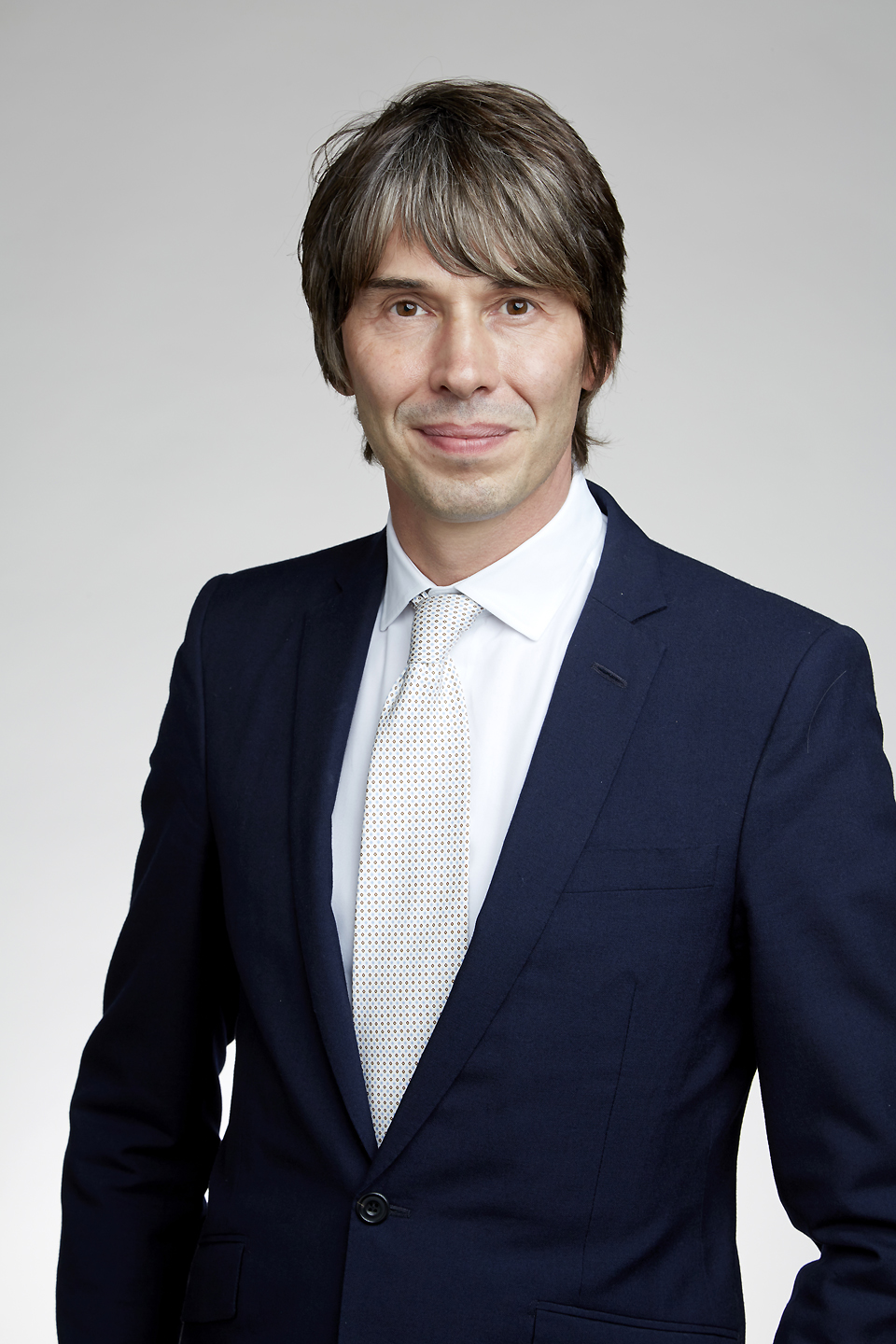
Brian Cox, physicist and presenter, was awarded an honorary doctorate by the OU.

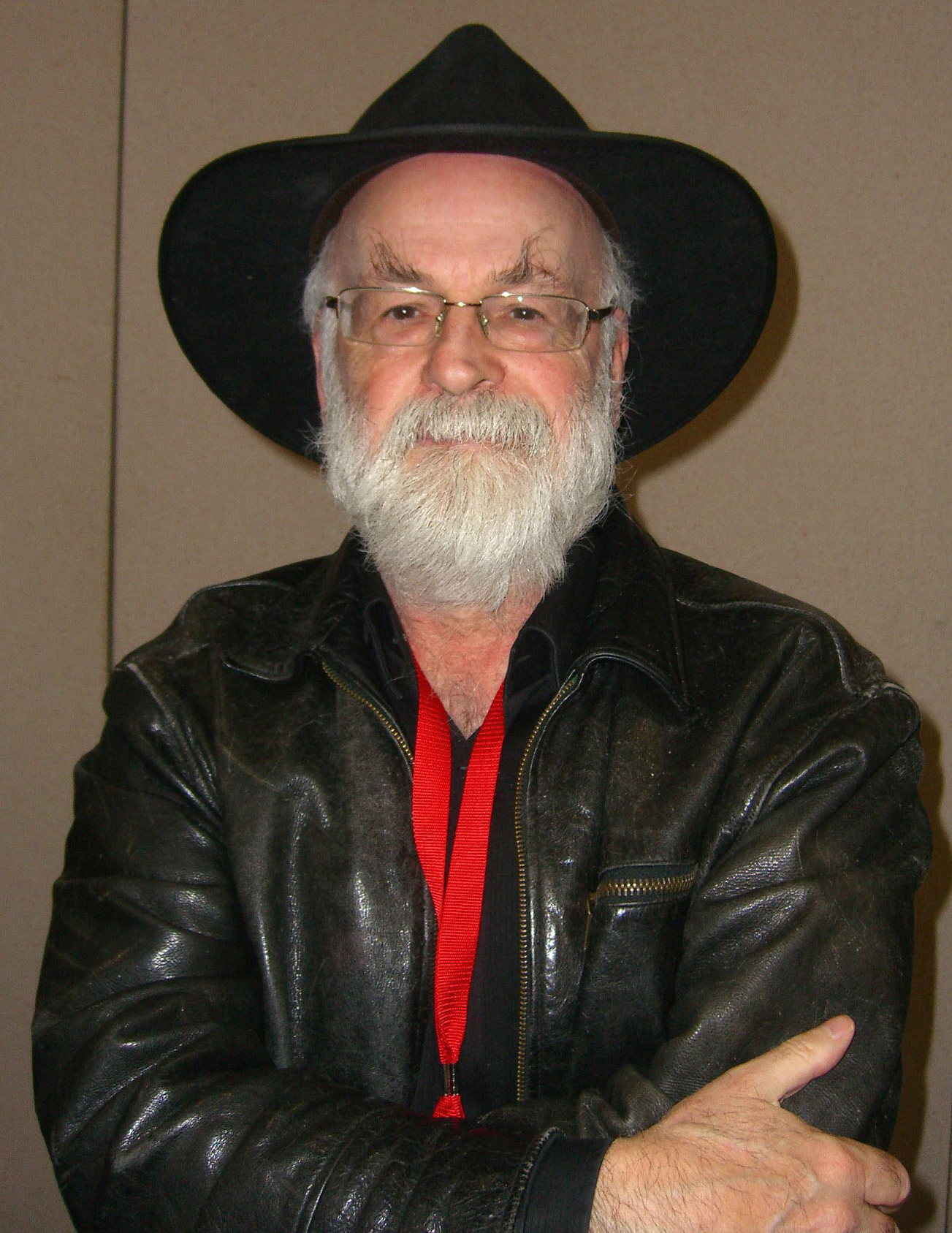
Author Terry Pratchett was awarded an honorary doctorate in 2013.

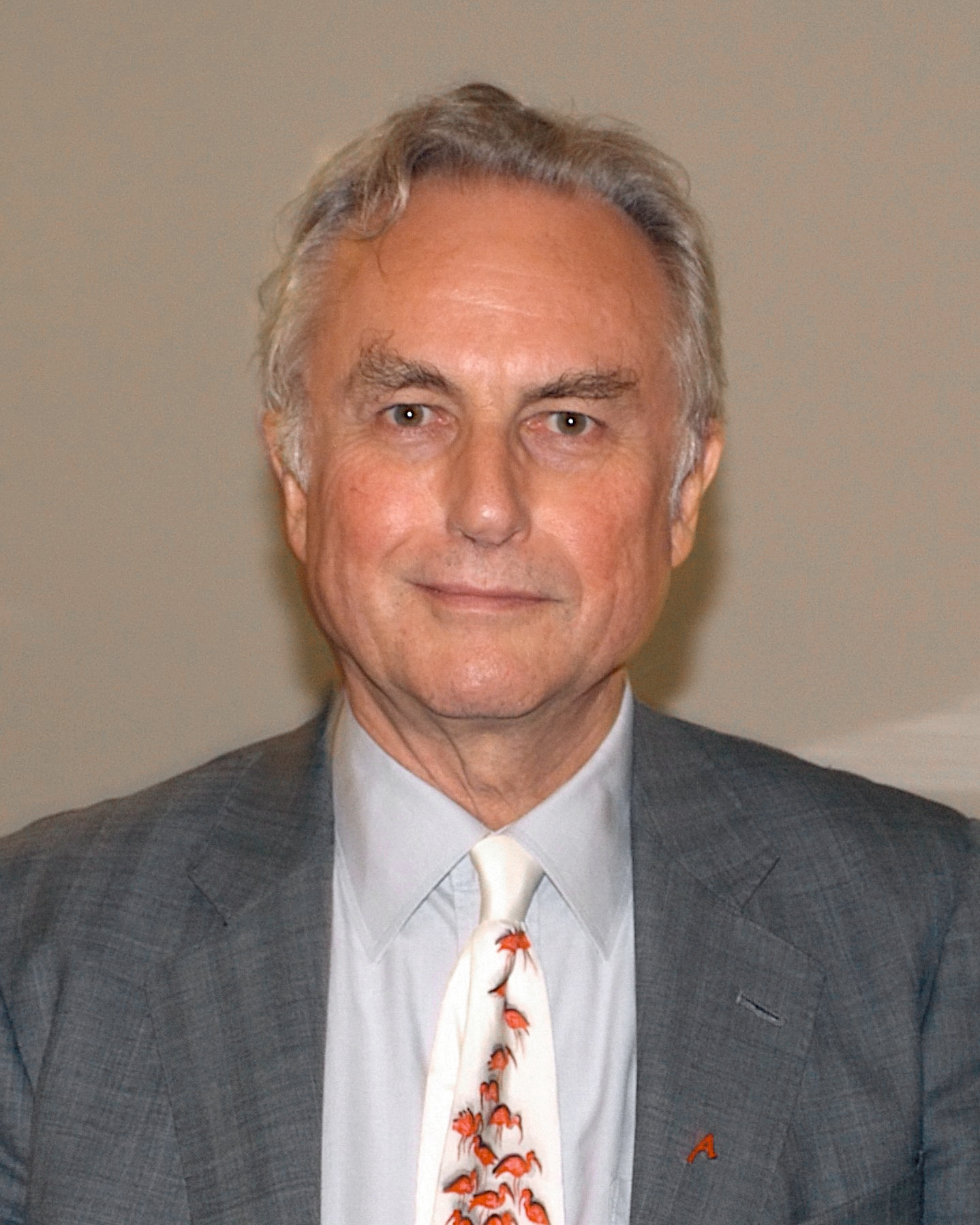
Richard Dawkins holds an honorary doctorate from the Open University.

== Honours and awards ==
As of 2023, the Open University has twice won the BBC's University Challenge quiz, in 1984 and 1999.

== In fiction ==
The Open University has been featured in many films and television programmes. The plot of Educating Rita surrounds the working-class titular character aiming to "improve" herself by studying English literature. She attends private tutorials run by alcoholic lecturer Frank.

Television characters have also followed OU courses. These include Anne Bryce in the BBC sit-com Ever Decreasing Circles, Yvonne Sparrow in Goodnight Sweetheart, and George Bulman in Bulman, the ITV spin-off from the series Strangers. Sheila Grant (Sue Johnston) was accused of having an affair with her tutor in Brookside. Onslow, a character from Keeping up Appearances, watches Open University programming on television from time to time.

In autumn 2006, Lenny Henry was a star in Slings and Arrows, a one-off BBC television drama which he also wrote, about someone who falls in love while on an OU English Literature course. (Henry has himself completed an OU degree in English.)

In the 2006/07 TV series Life on Mars, Sam Tyler received messages from the real world via Open University programmes late at night.

Dorian Green from Birds of a Feather announced she had been accepted by the Open University to do a degree in psychology and began studying with the university in series 3.

In the 2014 Booker Prize long-listed novel The Bone Clocks by David Mitchell (author), the protagonist Holly Sykes is referenced studying psychology at the Open University.

In the 2016 novel Swing Time by Zadie Smith, the narrator's mother is a student at the Open University.

In the TV series Bottom, specifically the episode Accident, Eddie, Spudgun, and Dave Hedgehog watch TV while playing hide-and-seek with Ritchie. They fall asleep, leaving Ritchie in a cupboard until they finally awaken to an OU lecture on 'Medieval population distribution patterns in Lower Saxony'.

== Partnerships ==
=== Armed Forces ===
Through an agreement between the Ministry of Defence and the OU going back to the early 1970s, a wide range of courses is available to members of the British armed forces, with course materials supplied via the student's BFPO address. OU study centres have been established in Cyprus and Germany. Many have studied while on active service, even in conflict situations.

=== Partner institutions ===
The Open University has a diverse network of partners across the globe. Once approved, partner institutions offer Open University validated awards, granted under the university's royal charter. As of October 2021, the Open University has over 40 international partners, including for example Union School of Theology, Regent's University London, York College, Belfast Metropolitan College, American College of Greece, Leeds City College and Ruskin College Oxford.

=== Doctoral training partnerships ===
==== The Grand Union ====
The Grand Union is an ESRC Doctoral Training Partnership uniting The Open University, the University of Oxford and Brunel University London. The partnership is committed to a student-centred approach to training researchers, increasing access to postgraduate study, and advancing disciplinary and interdisciplinary research.

==== Open-Oxford-Cambridge AHRC Doctoral Training ====
Open-Oxford-Cambridge AHRC Doctoral Training Partnership is a consortium of the Open University, University of Oxford and University of Cambridge providing funding and training for doctoral students in the arts and humanities.

==== Imperial-Cambridge-Open Centre for Doctoral Training ====
From 2014 to 2022, the Open University is working with Imperial College London and the University of Cambridge to establish a new EPSRC-funded Centre for Doctoral Training (CDT) to develop skills in civil nuclear energy for global markets.

== Coat of Arms ==
Coat of arms of Open University
Crest On a Wreath Or and Azure, between two branches of laurel Or the leaves fimbriated Gules a round based escutcheon Azure round pierced in the Canton. Escutcheon Azure, an open book Proper bound Gules and irradiated Or and on a Chief also Or two wreaths of laurel fructed Proper. Supporters On either side a lion rampant Or supporting a sapling leaved and fructed Proper. Motto 'Learn and Live'

== See also ==
- Armorial of UK universities – Universities' Coats of Arms
- List of Open University Alumni
- List of universities in the United Kingdom
- Open University Press – McGraw Hill brand by acquisition
- University of Hagen – German university
