= Christine Grosart =

Cave diver and involved in marine conservation

- Occupation: Offshore Dive Medic / Paramedic / Caving Instructor
- Known for: cave diving and exploring

Christine Grosart is a cave diver and explorer. She holds the British women’s cave diving depth record. For 8 years she was a trustee and team leader of the award winning marine conservation charity, Ghost Fishing UK.

== Career ==
Following her family's interests, Grosart learnt scuba diving as a child. After leaving school at 16, she has had a diverse career. She initially worked in horse-racing for 10 years and rode in steeplechases. During this time she studied Geosciences with the Open University. In 2004 she changed career to train within the ambulance service, becoming qualified as a paramedic in 2010 with a degree from the University of the West of England.

She started cave diving with the Cave Diving Group in 2005 and has subsequently explored caves in the UK, France, Croatia and dived in caves in Mexico and also the USA. She is an examiner for the Cave Diving Group. Grosart achieved a women’s solo cave diving depth record at Wookey Hole Caves, UK in 2009.

By 2016 she had qualified as an offshore dive medic.

Between 2010 and 2020 she was a professional caving instructor with her own company and now works full time as a dive medic on saturation dive vessels in the North Sea.

Grosart, for 8 years was a trustee for the charity Ghost Fishing UK that was founded around 2015. She was the charity's secretary, a trustee and also a team diver and underwater photographer. She has led removal of abandoned, lost or discarded fishing gear from the sea around the British Isles that would otherwise cause a hazard to humans and animals in the sea. She wrote the first ever Ghost Fishing diving course.

More recently, she featured in Louise Minchin's award winning book Fearless about women making great achievements in sport.

== Awards ==
In 2020 she was awarded fellowship of the Royal Geographical Society, owing to her cave exploration and marine conservation work. In November 2020 she was included in the BBC Radio 4 Woman's Hour Power list 2020 due to her cave diving exploration and her extensive work as a volunteer diver, trustee and instructor for Ghost Fishing UK and organising beach cleans around the south coast of England.
