= Battle of Cadoret =

- Part of the Breton War of Succession
Date	17 June 1345
Location	Les Forges, Duchy of Brittany France 48.019°N 2.646°W
Result	Charles of Blois retreat

Belligerents
House of Montfort, Brittany; Kingdom of England	House of Blois, Brittany; Kingdom of France

Commanders and leaders
Sir Thomas Dagworth	Charles of Blois

Strength
About 500	About 300

Casualties and losses
Unknown	Unknown

The Battle of Cadoret took place on the moorland of Cadoret near Lanouée (commune of Les Forges) in 1345 as part of the War of Succession of Brittany (1341–1365).

== Context ==
The battle occurred after the victorious siege of the city of Quimper by Charles of Blois in 1344.

== Development ==
Thomas Dagworth, was en route to Ploërmel through Oust à Cadoret. Opposite, Charles of Blois and his army arrived by the Landes de Cadoret. The two forces engaged and the fight lasted the entire afternoon. Caught under a rain of arrows from Welsh archers, the army of Charles suffered many losses.

== Aftermath ==
The French captains Galois de la Heuse and Péan of Fontenay were made prisoners and Charles abandoned the field.
