= John I of Lorraine =

Duke of Lorraine from 1346 to 1390

John I
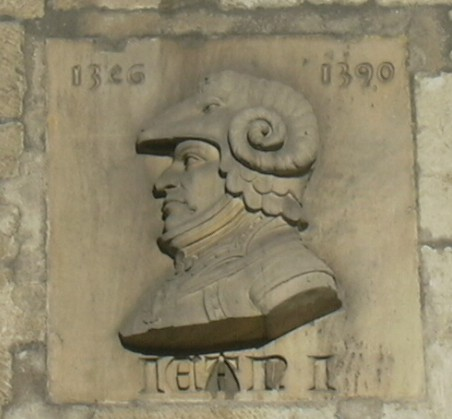
- Effigy of John I (Iean I) in Nancy

Duke of Lorraine
- Reign: 26 August 1346 - 27 September 1390
- Predecessor: Rudolph
- Successor: Charles II
- Born: February 1346
- Died: 23 September 1390 (aged 44); Paris
- Spouse: Sophie of Württemberg (m. 1361)
- Issue: Charles II; Frederick, Count of Vaudémont; Isabelle
- House: House of Metz
- Father: Rudolph, Duke of Lorraine
- Mother: Marie of Blois

John I (February 1346 – 23 September 1390) was the Duke of Lorraine from 1346 to his death. As an infant of six months, he succeeded his father, Rudolph, who was killed in the Battle of Crécy. His mother was Marie of Blois.

== Life ==
During John's long minority, the regency was in the hands of his mother and Eberhard III of Württemberg. In December 1353, he did homage for the duchy to Charles IV, Holy Roman Emperor, who made him lieutenant-general of the Empire in the Moselle country. In 1354, John II of France granted John a dispensation which allowed him to govern the duchy despite not yet being of age.

John participated in the Lithuanian Crusade at the sides of the Teutonic Knights against Lithuania in 1356 and again in 1365.

On 19 September 1356, John fought in the Battle of Poitiers, where thousands of French soldiers were mowed down by English longbowmen. He survived, however, unlike his father, to fight again, although he was taken prisoner by the English. John later fought on the side of the Dauphin Charles in putting down the Parisian rebellion of Étienne Marcel. He attended Charles' coronation on 19 May 1364 in Rheims, strengthening the ties to France which had steadily been building in Lorraine for the past century.

John entered the War of the Breton Succession to aid his uncle Charles of Blois against John of Montfort. At the Battle of Auray on 29 September 1364 with Montfort as undisputed duke and Charles dead on the field, he was taken prisoner.

John continued to aid Charles V and Charles VI to reconquer the provinces lost by the Treaty of Brétigny, but in his latter years, he distanced himself from the French court. This was due, in part, to the free companies ravaging his lands and the royal officials who tried to litigate the relationship between John (an Imperial vassal) and his vassals. In the end, he entered into rapprochement with Philip II, Duke of Burgundy. Nonetheless, John died in Paris on 22 September 1390, defending himself against a charge of abuse of power by the people of Neufchâteau.

== Family ==
John married Sophie of Württemberg (1343–1369), daughter of Eberhard II, Count of Württemberg and Elizabeth von Henneberg-Schleusingen, in 1361.They had issue:

- Charles II, Duke of Lorraine (1365–1431)
- Frederick of Lorraine, Count of Vaudémont (1369–1415)
- Isabelle of Lorraine (d.1423), married Enguerrand VII, Lord of Coucy.

John later married Marguerite de Chini (d. 1372), who is interred at Orval Abbey.

== Sources ==
- Bogdan, Henry (2007). La Lorraine des Ducs (in French). Perrin.
- Chattaway, Carol (2006). The Order of the Golden Tree: The Gift-Giving Objectives of Duke Philip the Bold of Burgundy. Brepols.

== See also ==
- Dukes of Lorraine family tree

John I of Lorraine House of Metz Born: February 1346 Died: 23 September 1390
Preceded by Rudolph	Duke of Lorraine; 1346-1390	Succeeded by Charles II
