= Fontenelle Abbey (Nord) =

Cistercian nunnery in Nord, France

Coordinates: 50.321544°N 3.491383°E

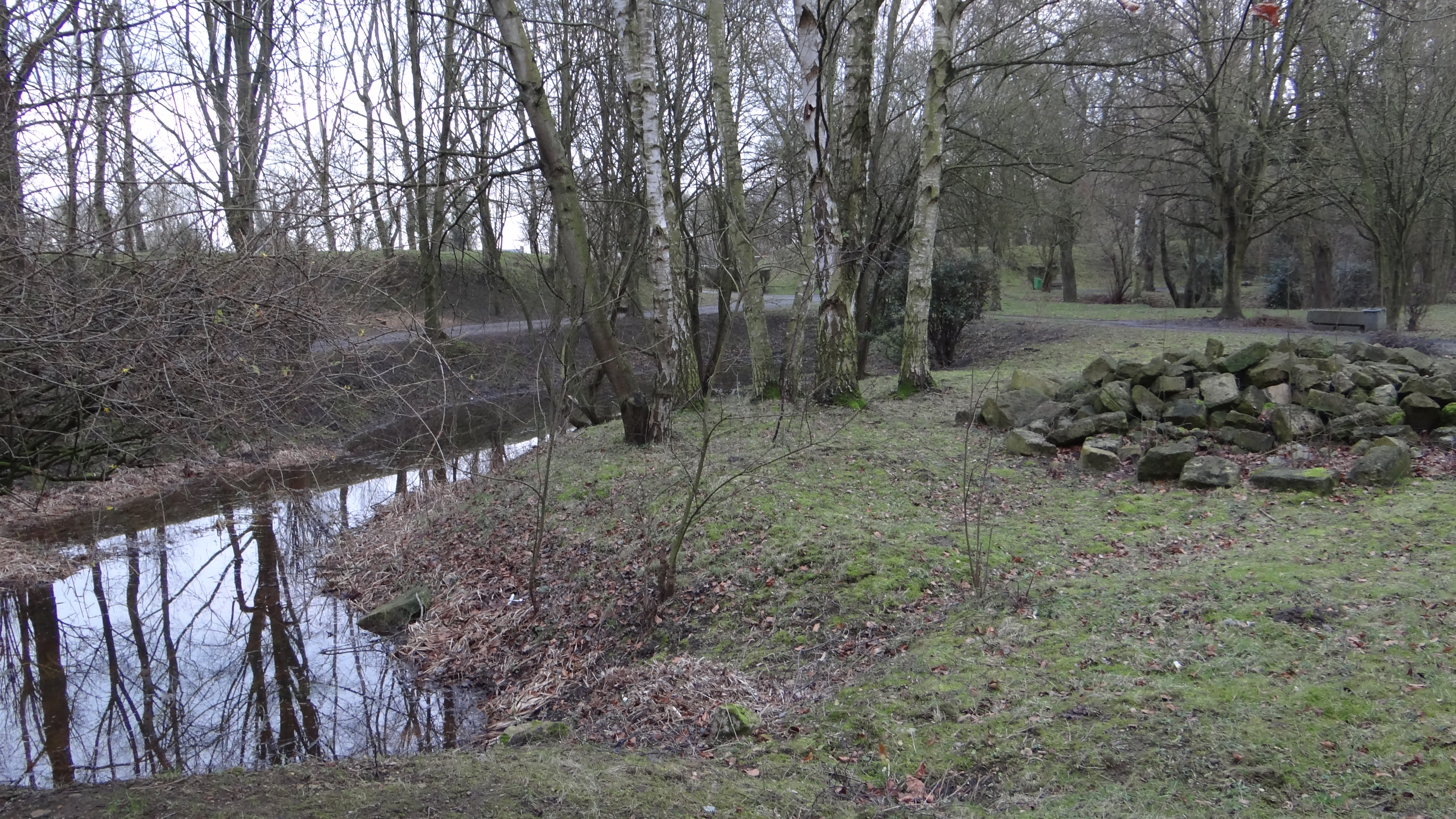
Archaeological park on the site of the abbey

Fontenelle Abbey (French: Abbaye de Fontenelle) was a Cistercian nunnery in Maing, Nord, France, extant from 1212 to 1793.

== History ==
The abbey was founded in 1212 to the south of Valenciennes on the banks of the Scheldt as a small oratory by two sisters Agnes and Jeanne, daughters of Hélin, seigneur d'Aulnoy. It became a Cistercian abbey in 1218. The convent was under the protection of the Counts of Hainaut and were endowed with considerable riches and land. Many noble ladies joined or chose to retire at Fontenelle.

It grew famous in the 14th century after Joan of Valois, Countess of Hainaut (1294–1352; daughter of Charles of Valois, sister of King Philip VI of France, widow of William I, Count of Hainaut, and mother-in-law of Emperor Louis IV), entered the community in 1337 At Fontenelle she maintained her own chancellery and personal staff, received guests from court and was kept up to day in political affairs. Joan of Valois died at Fontenelle and was buried there. Her sister-in-law, Joan, also became a nun at Fontenelle.

After several destructions and reconstructions during the course of the centuries, the nunnery was dissolved in 1793 in the French Revolution and demolished. It was then sold to a building contractor who made it a stone quarry. It lay forgotten until 1977, when during building works on the Scheldt canal, remains came to light. These were archaeologically investigated and in part put on display in the museum in Valenciennes. The site itself was made into a park and is accessible to visitors.

== See also ==
- Abbey of Saint Wandrille (also known as Fontenelle Abbey)
- Fontenelles Abbey

== Sources ==
- Cistercian Sites in Europe. Charte Européenne des Abbayes et Sites Cisterciens 2012, p. 66
- Bernard Peugniez, 2001: Routier cistercien, Editions Gaud, Moisenay, p. 235 ISBN 2-84080-044-6
