= Joan of Valois, Countess of Hainaut =

Countess consort of Hainaut, Holland, and Zeeland (c. 1294 – 1352)

Joan of Valois
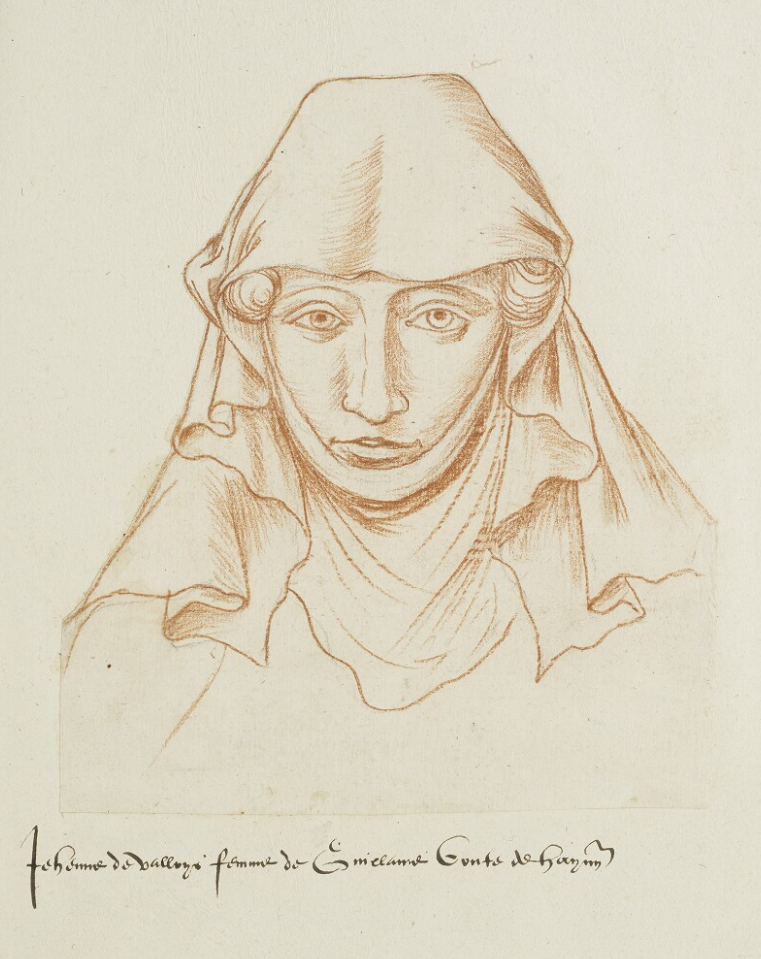
- Copy of a contemporary portrait in the Recueil d'Arras (about 1560)

Countess consort of Hainaut, Holland, and Zeeland
- Tenure: 1305–1337
- Born: 1294; Longpont, Aisne, France
- Died: 1352 (aged 57–58); Fontenelle Abbey, Maing, France
- Burial: Fontenelle Abbey, Maing, France
- Spouse: William I, Count of Hainaut
- Issue Detail: William II, Count of Hainaut; Margaret, Holy Roman Empress; Philippa, Queen of England; Joanna, Duchess of Jülich; Isabella of Hainaut
- House: Valois
- Father: Charles, Count of Valois
- Mother: Margaret, Countess of Anjou

Joan of Valois (c. 1294 – 1352) was a Countess consort of Hainaut, Holland, and Zeeland, by marriage to William I, Count of Hainaut. She acted as regent of Hainaut and Holland several times during the absence of her husband, and she also acted as a political mediator.

She was the second-eldest daughter of the French prince Charles, Count of Valois, and Margaret, Countess of Anjou. As the sister of King Philip VI of France and the mother-in-law of King Edward III of England, she was ideally placed to act as mediator between them.

== Early life ==
Joan was the second daughter of Count Charles of Valois and his first wife Margaret. In 1299, Joan's mother died, probably in childbirth, and her father married his second wife, Catherine I of Courtenay, Titular Empress of Constantinople, by whom he had four more children. By her father's third marriage with Mahaut of Châtillon, Joan became the half sister of Isabella of Valois and the Empress Blanche of Valois, who married Charles IV, Holy Roman Emperor.

== Countess of Hainaut and Holland ==
Joan married William I, Count of Hainaut, on 23 May 1305. They had been engaged in 1302, and the marriage took place to ensure William's loyalty toward France.

The chronicle Van den derden Eduwaert by Jan van Boendale describe Joan as a good and pious woman who wisely fulfilled the traditional task of mediator. She fulfilled the traditional role to supervise the household and court and act as a benefactor of artists, but also kept herself updated on political affairs and maintained contact with her family in both France and England, which kept her well informed of political matters. During the many absences of her spouse, Joan was left to handle the economy and political affairs of the realms, receive diplomats and travel between Hainaut and Holland to maintain control.

She was a supporter of her cousin, Isabella of France, Queen of England, in her struggle against her husband, King Edward II of England. In December 1325, Joan traveled to France to attend the funeral of her father and had talks with Queen Isabella and her brother, King Charles IV of France. This brought about an alliance between Hainaut, the Queen of England, and the English exiles, who were in opposition to the English king and his favorite, Hugh Despenser the Younger. Isabella's son, Edward of Windsor, became engaged to Joan's daughter, Philippa of Hainault, and Isabella raised an army in their lands. It was also from there that Isabella and her lover, Roger Mortimer, 1st Earl of March, began their invasion of England.

In 1332, after Joan's daughter Philippa had become queen, Joan arranged a wedding between Isabella's daughter Eleanor of Woodstock and Reginald II, Duke of Guelders, and she visited her daughter Philippa in England.

== Later life: mediator ==
After her husband William I died in 1337, Joan took the veil and entered into Fontenelle Abbey in Maing. The fact that she took the veil did not mean that she retired from the world: she maintained her own chancellery and personal staff, received guests from court and was kept up to day in political affairs.

In 1340, her son-in-law King Edward III dealt her brother King Philip VI a heavy blow by defeating him at sea near Sluys. Edward III then went on to besiege Tournai, but was beset by financial problems. Pope Benedict XII thus asked Joan to mediate. She first went to her brother, whom she had begged for peace. Then she went to her son-in-law, in his tent, and begged him for peace as well. The pleas of their relative Joan, sent by the pope, allowed the two kings to sign a truce without loss of face.

In 1345, she also acted as a mediator in a conflict in the city of Tournai. Joan died on 7 March 1352 at the abbey of Fontenelle.

== Issue ==
Joan and William had:

- William II, Count of Hainaut (1307–1345)
- John (died 1316)
- Margaret II of Avesnes, Holy Roman Empress (1311–1356), Countess of Hainaut and Holland, married Louis IV, Holy Roman Emperor
- Philippa of Hainault, Queen of England (24 June 1314 – 1369), married king Edward III of England
- Agnes (died 1327)
- Joanna of Hainaut, Duchess of Jülich (1315–1374), married William V, Duke of Jülich.
- Isabella of Hainaut (1323–1361), married Robert of Namur, the son of John I, Count of Namur. There was no issue.
- Louis (1325–1328)

== Sources ==
- Courtenay, William J. (2020). "King's Hall and Michaelhouse in the Context of Fourteenth-Century Cambridge". In Marenbon, John (ed.). King's Hall, Cambridge and the Fourteenth-Century Universities: New Perspectives. Brill.
- Mortimer, Ian (2008). The Perfect King The Life of Edward III, Father of the English Nation. Vintage. pp. 179–180.
- Sumption, Jonathan (1990). The Hundred Years War:Trial by Battle. Vol. I. Faber & Faber.
- Warner, Katheryn (2017). Isabella of France, The Rebel Queen. Amberley Publishing.
- Warner, Kathryn (2020). Philippa of Hainault: Mother of the English Nation. Amberley Publishing.
