= Margaret, Countess of Anjou =

Countess of Anjou and Maine from 1290 to 1299

Margaret
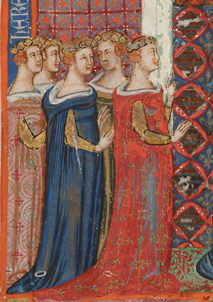
- Margaret with her sisters in the Bible of Naples

Countess of Anjou and Maine
- Reign: 1290–1299
- Predecessor: Charles II
- Successor: Philip I
- Born: 1272
- Died: 31 December 1299 (aged 27)
- Burial: Église des Jacobins, Paris
- Spouse: Charles, Count of Valois (m. 1290)
- Issue among others...: Philip VI, King of France; Joan, Countess of Hainaut; Margaret, Countess of Blois; Charles II, Count of Alençon
- House: Capetian House of Anjou
- Father: Charles II of Naples
- Mother: Mary of Hungary

Margaret (French: Marguerite d'Anjou; 1272 – 31 December 1299) was the Countess of Anjou and Maine in her own right and Countess of Valois, Alençon and Perche by marriage.

Born in 1272, Margaret was a daughter of King Charles II of Naples and Mary of Hungary. Her father ceded to her husband, Charles of Valois, the counties of Anjou and Maine as her dowry. Margaret married the Count of Valois, a son of King Philip III of France, at Corbeil in August 1290. Their children included:

- Isabella (1292–1309); married John III of Brittany.
- Philip VI of France (1293 – 22 August 1350), first king of the Valois dynasty.
- Joan (1294 – 7 March 1342); married Count William I of Hainaut and had issue.
- Margaret (1295 – July 1342); married Count Guy I of Blois, and had issue.
- Charles II of Alençon (1297 – 26 August 1346 at the Battle of Crécy), Count of Alençon, Perche, Chartres and Joigny.
- Catherine (born 1299, died young)

Margaret was succeeded by her eldest son.

== Sources ==
- Commire, Anne; Klezmer, Deborah, eds. (1999). Women in World History: Maa-Mei. Yorkin Publications.
- Wood, Charles T. (1966). The French Apanages and the Capetian Monarchy: 1224-1328. Harvard University Press.

Margaret, Countess of Anjou Capetian House of Anjou Cadet branch of the Capetian dynasty Born: 1273 Died: 31 December 1299
Regnal titles
Preceded by Charles the Lame	Countess of Anjou and Maine; 1290–1299 with Charles of Valois	Succeeded by Philip the Fortunate
