= Rudolph, Duke of Lorraine =

Duke of Lorraine from 1328 to 1346

Rudolph
- Duke of Lorraine
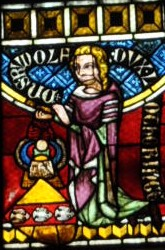
- Rudolph, Duke of Lorraine
- Born: 1320; Lorraine, France
- Died: 26 August 1346 (aged about 26); Crécy-en-Ponthieu
- Spouse: Eleanor of Bar; Marie of Blois
- Issue: John I, Duke of Lorraine
- House: House of Lorraine
- Father: Frederick IV, Duke of Lorraine
- Mother: Elisabeth of Austria

Rudolph (1320 – 26 August 1346), called the Valiant (le Vaillant), was the Duke of Lorraine from 1328 to his death. He was the son and successor of Frederick IV, Duke of Lorraine and Elisabeth of Austria, the daughter of King Albert I of Germany of the House of Habsburg. Though he was but nine years of age when his father died and he succeeded to the duchy under the regency of his mother (until 1334), he was a warrior prince, taking part in four separate wars in Lorraine, France, Brittany, and Iberia. He was killed at the Battle of Crécy.

== Life ==
In 1337, Count Henry IV of Bar refused to do homage for a few seignories he held of the duke. Rudolph was forced to devastate Pont-à-Mousson and its environs. In a series of reprisals, Henry ravaged the west of Lorraine and Rudolph attacked the Barrois. Only by the intervention of King Philip VI of France was the war ended. By that time, the ties of Lorraine to France had become very strong. They were to become stronger under the half-Habsburg Rudolph for his second marriage was to the daughter of a French lord, Guy I of Châtillon, Count of Blois and Margaret of Valois (a sister of the king of France), thus making his wife the niece of the king. He also assisted King Philip VI with troops to lift King Edward III of England's Siege of Tournai (1340) in the opening phase of the Hundred Years' War.

During a brief Anglo-French peace, he journeyed to the Iberian Peninsula to aid King Alfonso XI of Castile in the Reconquista. He battled the Moors of Granada and shone in the Battle of Gibraltar on 3 November 1340.

On his return to France, he came to the aid of his French brother-in-law, Charles, Duke of Brittany, in the War of the Breton Succession. He returned to King Philip's side at the Battle of Crécy and was killed there, along with many illustrious French cavaliers on 26 August 1346.

== Family ==
His first wife was Eleanor (Aliénor), daughter of Edward I, Count of Bar and Mary of Burgundy. Their marriage took place at Pont-à-Mousson in 1329, but they had no children before Eleanor's death in 1332. He then remarried to Marie of Blois (1323–1380), the daughter of the aforementioned Guy of Blois and Margaret of Valois, sister of King Philip VI. They had three children:

- twins (died before 31 July 1343)
- John I, Duke of Lorraine (1346–1390), his successor

== See also ==
- House of Lorraine

== Sources ==
- Bogdan, Henry (2007). La Lorraine des Ducs (in French). Perrin.
- Scott-Stokes, Charity; Given-Wilson, Chris, eds. (2008). Chronicon Anonymi Cantuariensis: The Chronicle of Anonymous of Canterbury, 1346-1365. Oxford University Press.

Rudolph, Duke of Lorraine House of Metz Born: 1320 Died: 26 August 1346
Preceded by Frederick IV	Duke of Lorraine; 1328–1346	Succeeded by John I
