= Saint Remigius (disambiguation) =

Saint Remigius may refer to:

- Saint Remigius of Reims (born c. 437 – 533), bishop of Reims and Apostle of the Franks,
- Saint Remigius of Rouen (born c. 727 – 772), archbishop of Rouen,
- Saint Remigius of Strasbourg (died 20 March 783), bishop of Strasbourg,
- Saint Remigius of Lyon (died 28 October 875), archbishop of Lyon,
- Saint Remigius de Fécamp of Lincoln (died 7 May 1092), bishop of Lincoln,
- Saint Remigius Isoré (1852- 1900), priest and martyr during Boxer Rebellion.
