= Rémy Isoré =

French missionary (1852-1900

Saint Rémy Isoré SJ
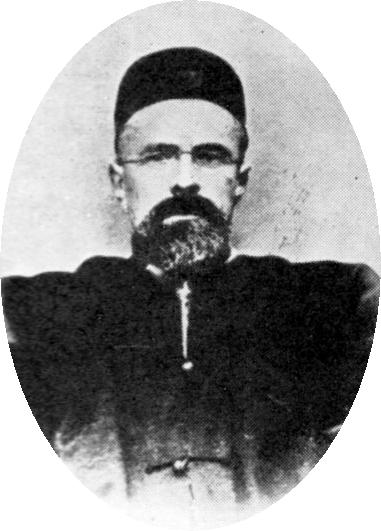

Martyr
- Born: 22 January 1852; Bambecque, France
- Died: 19 June 1900 (aged 48); Wuyi, Hebei, China
- Venerated in: Roman Catholic Church
- Beatified: 17 April 1956, Saint Peter's Square by Pope Pius XII
- Canonized: 1 October 2000, Saint Peter's Square by Pope John Paul II
- Feast: 19 June

Rémy Isoré (22 January 1852 – 19 June 1900) was a French Jesuit priest who was killed during the Boxer Rebellion in China. He was declared a saint by Pope John Paul II in 2000.

== Early life and education ==
Isoré was born in Bambecque, France on 22 January 1852. He studied to become a priest for his own diocese in the diocesan seminary at Cambrai. He decided to join the Society of Jesus and so joined the Jesuit seminary at Saint-Acheul. He taught in the secondary school and also studied Theology in Jersey.

== Mission in China ==
Remy had asked his superiors to send him to Zambia, but he was sent to China to evangelize. He arrived in China in 1882. On 31 July 1886, Isoré was ordained a priest. After ordination he worked in many different roles in China.

== Death ==
Isoré was stationed at Weixian, in Zhili, Tianjin at the time of rise of the Boxer Rebellion. After hearing news of the rebels heading to his parish, he went to the nearby Jesuit mission in Wuyi. Modeste Andlauer was in charge of this mission. Next afternoon, on 19 July 1900, Andlaeur and Isoré were beheaded by the rebels while kneeling and praying. Their heads were displayed at the village entrance gate as a warning message for other Christians.

== Canonization ==
Isoré was beatified by Pius XII on 17 April 1956 and canonized by Pope John Paul II on 1 Oct 2000 along with other Chinese Martyrs.
