= Jardin botanique du Val d'Yser =

Non-profit botanical garden in Nord-Pas-de-Calais, France

Coordinates: 50°54′05″N 2°32′55″E

The Jardin botanique du Val d'Yser (2.5 hectares) is a non-profit botanical garden located at 1, rue du Perroquet Vert, Bambecque, Nord, Nord-Pas-de-Calais, France. It is open on the first weekend of June and by appointment; an admission fee is charged.

The garden was established in 2000 on an agricultural field, and organized into four asymmetric sections. By 2006 it contained over 830 identified plant taxa, which increased to more than 900 taxa by 2007.

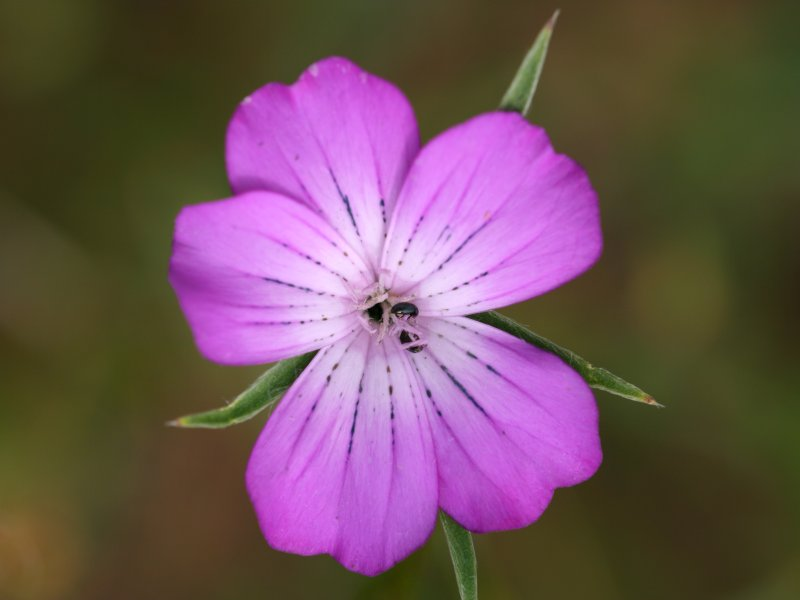
Jardin botanique du Val d'Yser

== See also ==
- List of botanical gardens in France
