= Forges de Lanouée =

Commune in Brittany, France

- Commune
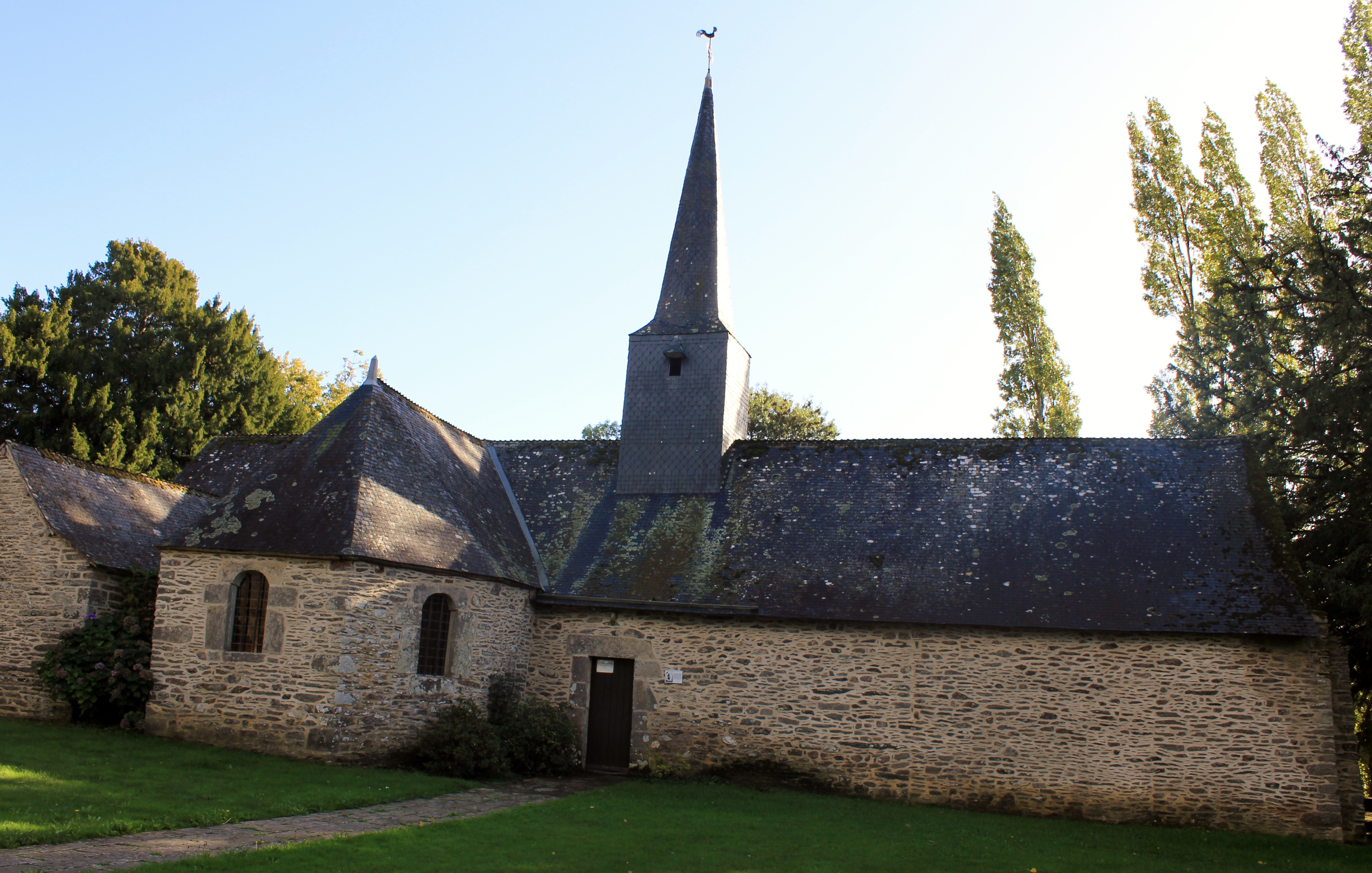
- The chapel of Saint-Mélec
- Location of Forges de Lanouée
- Location within France Location within Brittany
- Coordinates: 48°00′10″N 2°34′50″W
- Country: France
- Region: Brittany
- Department: Morbihan
- Arrondissement: Pontivy
- Canton: Ploërmel
- Intercommunality: Ploërmel Communauté

Government
  - Mayor (2026–32): André Briend
- Area^{1}: 96.29 km^{2} (37.18 sq mi)
- Highest elevation: 123 m (404 ft)
- Lowest elevation: 32 m (105 ft)
- Population (2023): 2,253
  - Density: 23.40/km^{2} (60.60/sq mi)
- Time zone: UTC+01:00 (CET)
  - Summer (DST): UTC+02:00 (CEST)
- INSEE/Postal code: 56102 /56120
- ^{1} French Land Register data, which excludes lakes, ponds, glaciers > 1 km^{2} (0.386 sq mi or 247 acres) and river estuaries.

Forges de Lanouée (French pronunciation: [fɔʁʒ də lanwe]; Breton: Govelioù-Lannoez) is a commune in the Morbihan department in Brittany, north-western France. It was established on 1 January 2019 by merger of the former communes of Lanouée (the seat) and Les Forges.

== Population ==
Population data refer to the area corresponding with the commune as of January 2025.

Historical population
Year	Pop.	±% p.a.
1968	2,465	—
1975	2,336	−0.76%
1982	2,284	−0.32%
1990	2,203	−0.45%
1999	2,123	−0.41%
2007	2,105	−0.11%
2012	2,141	+0.34%
2017	2,223	+0.75%
2023	2,253	+0.22%
Source: INSEE

== See also ==
- Communes of the Morbihan department
