= Marie de Châtillon (1323–1363) =

Duchess and co-regent of Lorraine

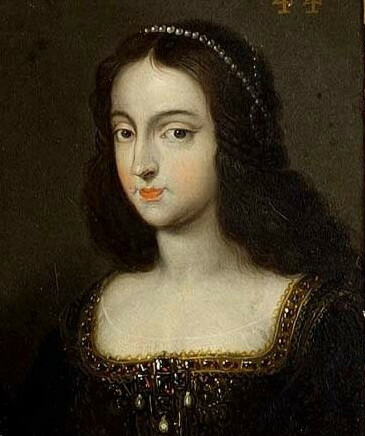
Marie de Châtillon

Marie de Châtillon (1323–1363) was the Duchess consort of Lorraine by marriage to Rudolph, Duke of Lorraine. She was the daughter of Guy I of Châtillon, Count of Blois and Margaret of Valois, sister of Philip VI of France.

She was Regent of Lorraine during the minority of her son John I, Duke of Lorraine from 1346 until 1354, when John II of France granted John a dispensation which allowed him to govern the duchy despite not yet being of age. She managed the regency as co-regent with Eberhard III of Württemberg.
