= Killem =

- Commune
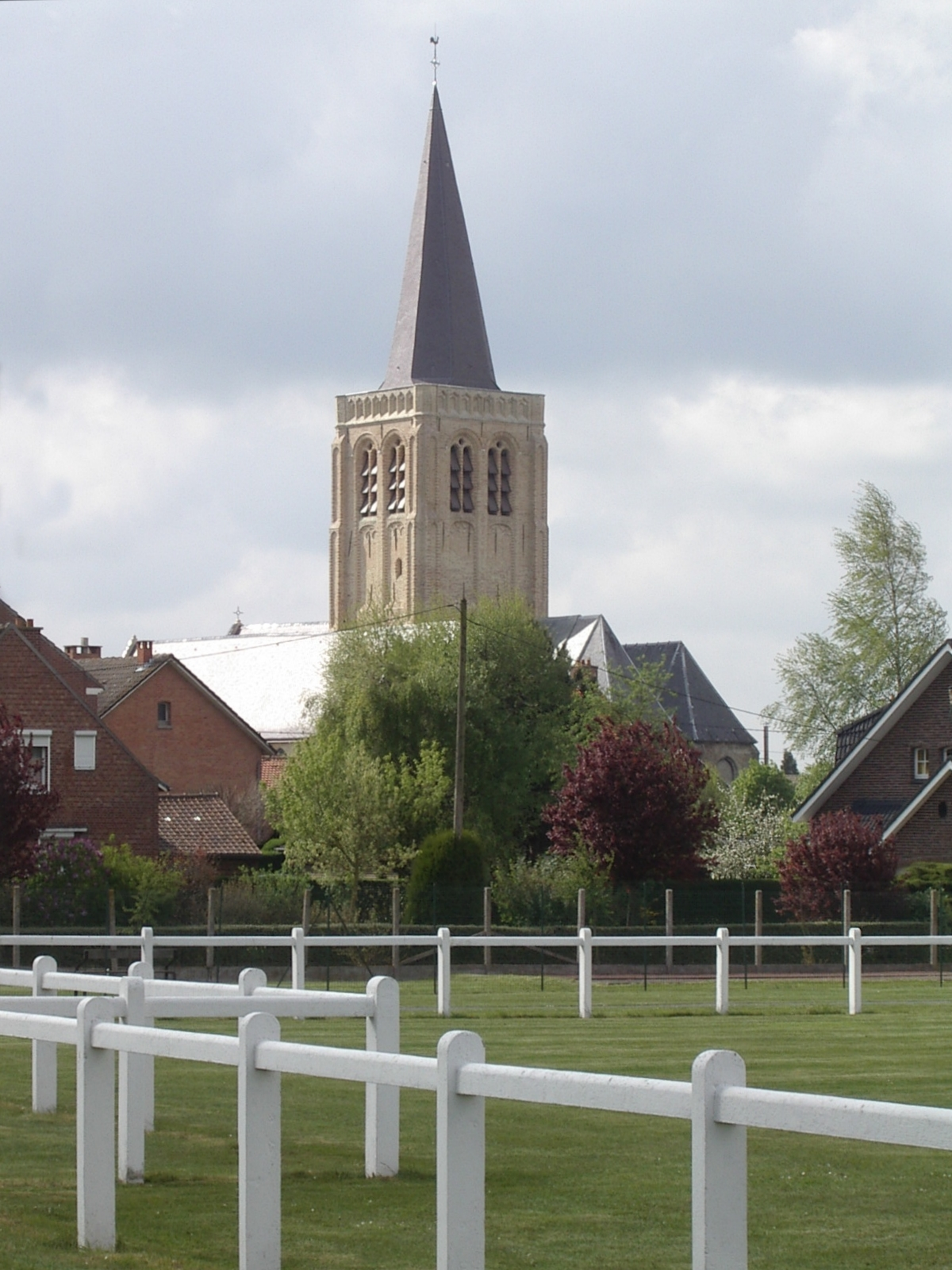
- The church in Killem

- Coat of arms
- Location of Killem
- Location within France Location within Hauts-de-France
- Coordinates: 50°58′00″N 2°34′00″E
- Country: France
- Region: Hauts-de-France
- Department: Nord
- Arrondissement: Dunkerque
- Canton: Wormhout
- Intercommunality: Hauts de Flandre

Government
  - Mayor (2020–2026): Jean-Luc Vanbaelinghem
- Area^{1}: 11.99 km^{2} (4.63 sq mi)
- Elevation: 7 m (23 ft)
- Highest elevation: 19 m (62 ft)
- Lowest elevation: 1 m (3.3 ft)
- Population (2023): 1,164
  - Density: 97.08/km^{2} (251.4/sq mi)
- Demonym: Killemois
- Time zone: UTC+01:00 (CET)
  - Summer (DST): UTC+02:00 (CEST)
- INSEE/Postal code: 59326 /59122
- ^{1} French Land Register data, which excludes lakes, ponds, glaciers > 1 km^{2} (0.386 sq mi or 247 acres) and river estuaries.

Killem (French pronunciation: [kilɛm]) is a commune in the Nord department in northern France.

== Heraldry ==
Arms of Killem	The arms of Killem are blazoned : Argent, a lion sable, langued gules. (The arms of Bambecque, Killem and Maing are essentially the same)

== See also ==
- Communes of the Nord department
