= Margaret of Valois, Countess of Blois =

French noblewoman

Margaret of Valois
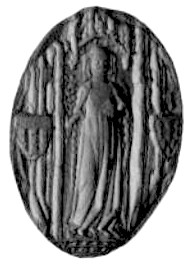
- Born: 1295
- Died: 1342 (aged 46–47)
- Noble family: Valois
- Spouse: Guy I, Count of Blois
- Issue: Louis I of Châtillon; Charles of Blois; Marie of Blois
- Father: Charles, Count of Valois
- Mother: Margaret, Countess of Anjou

Margaret of Valois (1295–1342) was a French noblewoman. She was a daughter of Charles, Count of Valois, and his first wife, Margaret, Countess of Anjou. She was also a sister of King Philip VI of France.

In 1310, she married Count Guy I of Blois. They had three children together:

- Louis II (d. 1346), count of Blois and lord of Avesnes, married Joan of Beaumont.
- Charles (d. 1364), married Joan of Penthièvre.
- Marie, married:

1. in 1334 to Rudolph, Duke of Lorraine (d. 1346)
2. Frederick VII, Count of Leiningen-Dagsburg.

== Sources ==
- Collins, James (2017). "Dynastic Instability, the Emergence of the French Monarchical Commonwealth and the Coming of the Rhetoric of "L'etat", 1360s to 1650s". In von Friedeburg, Robert; Morrill, John (eds.). Monarchy Transformed: Princes and their Elites in Early Modern Western Europe. Cambridge University Press.
- Jones, Michael (2000). "Politics, Sanctity and the Breton State: The Case of the Blessed Charles de Blois, Duke of Brittany (d.1364)". In Maddicott, John Robert; Palliser, David Michael (eds.). The Medieval State: Essays Presented to James Campbell. Hambledon Press.
- Prestwich, Michael (1993). The Three Edwards: War and State in England, 1272-1377. Routledge.
