= Lanouée =

Commune in Morbihan, France

Lanouée Lannoez
- Part of Forges de Lanouée
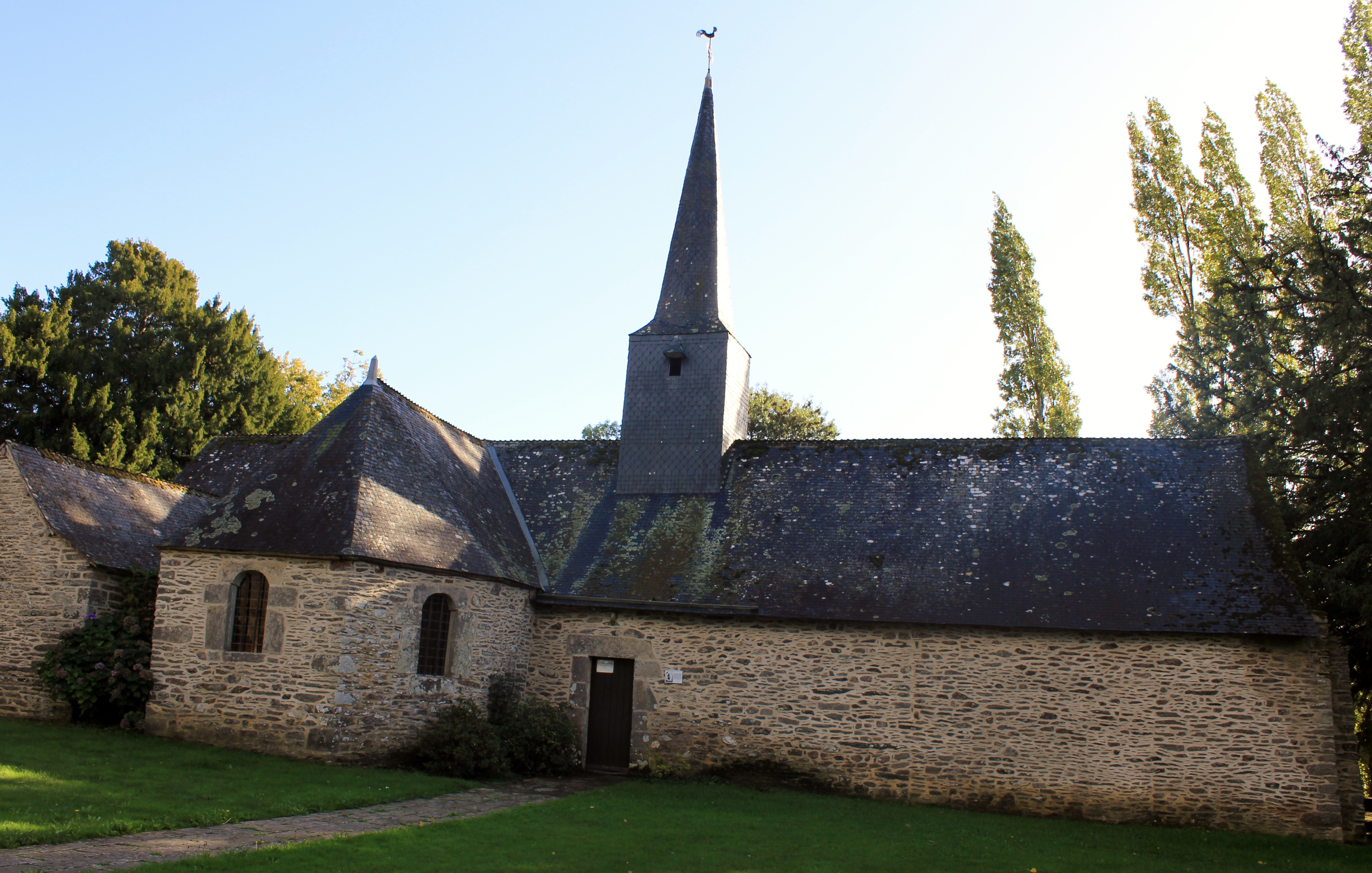
- The chapel of Saint-Mélec
- Location of Lanouée
- Location within France Location within Brittany
- Coordinates: 48°00′10″N 2°34′50″W
- Country: France
- Region: Brittany
- Department: Morbihan
- Arrondissement: Pontivy
- Canton: Ploërmel
- Commune: Forges de Lanouée
- Area^{1}: 43.76 km^{2} (16.90 sq mi)
- Highest elevation: 117 m (384 ft)
- Lowest elevation: 32 m (105 ft)
- Population (2022): 1,756
  - Density: 40.13/km^{2} (103.9/sq mi)
- Time zone: UTC+01:00 (CET)
  - Summer (DST): UTC+02:00 (CEST)
- Postal code: 56120
- ^{1} French Land Register data, which excludes lakes, ponds, glaciers > 1 km^{2} (0.386 sq mi or 247 acres) and river estuaries.

Lanouée (French pronunciation: [lanwe]; Breton: Lannoez) is a former commune in the Morbihan department of Brittany in north-western France. On 1 January 2019, it was merged into the new commune Forges de Lanouée. Inhabitants of Lanouée are called in French Lanouéens.

== See also ==
- Communes of the Morbihan department
