= Battle of Auray =

Part of the War of the Breton Succession (1364)

Coordinates: 47.6686°N 2.9814°W

- Part of the War of the Breton Succession (Hundred Years' War)
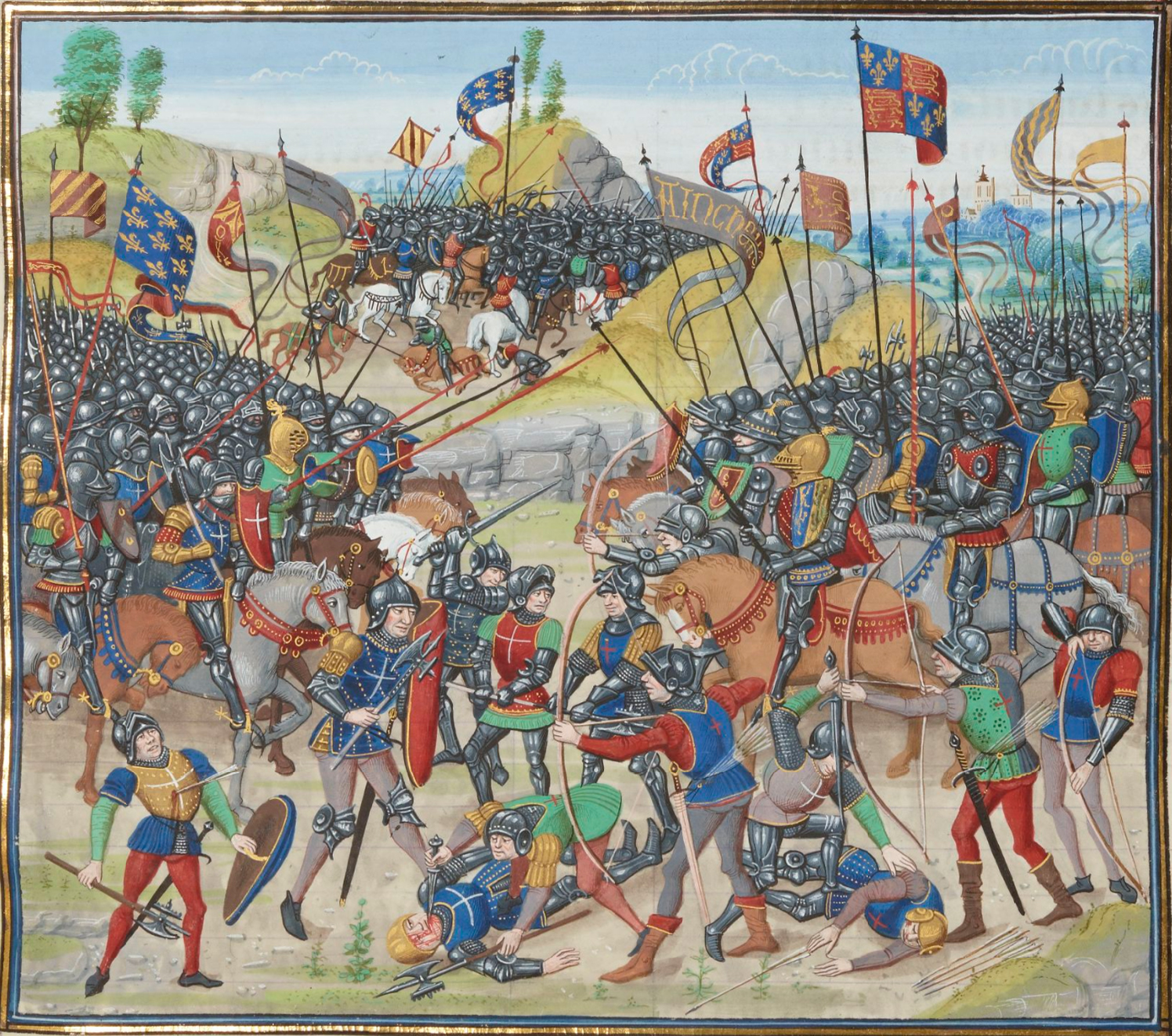
Date	29 September 1364
Location	Auray, France
Result	Anglo-Breton victory

Belligerents
House of Montfort, Brittany; Kingdom of England	House of Blois, Brittany; Kingdom of France

Commanders and leaders
John de Montfort; John Chandos	Charles of Blois †; Bertrand du Guesclin (POW)

Strength
6,000 men	4,000 men

Casualties and losses
Unknown but comparatively lighter	1,000+

The Battle of Auray (29 September 1364) at the Breton-French town of Auray was the decisive confrontation of the Breton War of Succession, a part of the Hundred Years' War.

In the battle, which began as a siege, a Breton army, led by Duke John de Montfort, assisted by English forces commanded by John Chandos, opposed a Breton army led by his rival Charles of Blois and assisted by French forces led by Bertrand du Guesclin.

== Prelude ==
At the beginning of 1364, after the failure of the negotiations of Évran, Montfort, with the assistance of John Chandos, came to attack Auray, which had been in the hands of Franco-Bretons since 1342. He entered the town of Auray and besieged the castle, which was blockaded by sea by the ships of Nicolas Bouchart coming from Le Croisic.

Without food supplies, the besieged agreed to surrender the place, if help did not arrive before Michaelmas (29 September). Two days before, Charles of Blois had arrived east of the abbey of Lanvaux. Bertrand du Guesclin, who commanded the vanguard of the French troops, was in nearby Brandivy.

On 28 September, du Guesclin landed on the left bank of the river and took up position before the castle. To avoid being caught between the castle and the French Army, Montfort evacuated Auray and took up a position facing the enemy, on the slope of the right bank of the river.

On 29 September, attempts at agreement having failed, Charles of Blois prepared for the attack. His army crossed the river and lined up facing south, considered a bad position by some of his commanders because it was on a marshy plain north of the town and castle. Montfort followed the movement and lined up facing north, in a more dominating position. Rejecting the advice of du Guesclin, Charles of Blois then ordered the attack against Montfort's forces.

== Involved forces ==
=== Franco-Breton army of Charles of Blois ===
On the left the Count of Auxerre, on the right Du Guesclin, in the center Charles of Blois. A reserve was not used. Each division had roughly 1,000 men.

=== Anglo-Breton army of John of Montfort ===
On the right Olivier de Clisson, on the left Robert Knolles, in the centre John de Montfort and John Chandos. A significant reserve, under Hugh Calveley, was also on hand ready to intervene.

== Battle ==
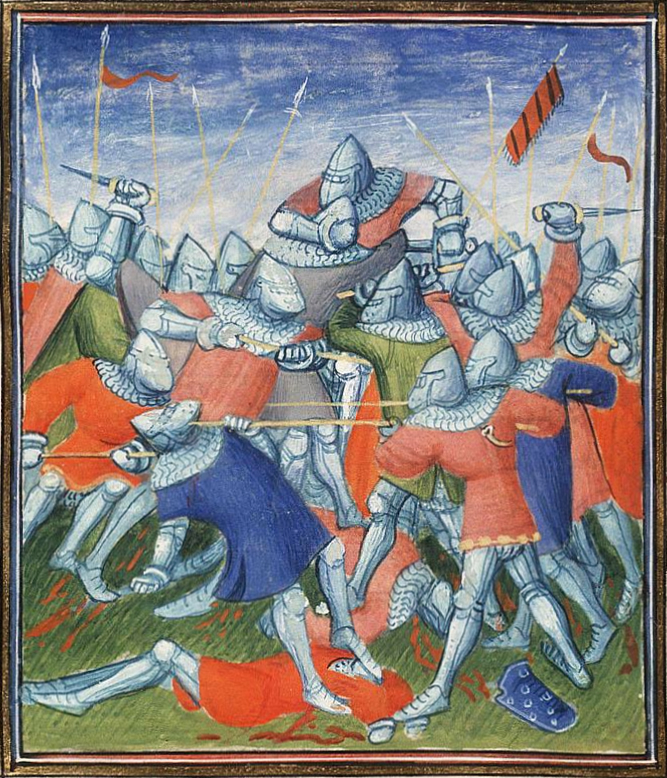
The Battle of Auray

The battle began with a short skirmish between the French arbalesters and the English longbowmen. The men-at-arms then engaged directly without seeking to maneuver. It was a bloody combat because all wanted the battle to be decisive to put an end to the long and cruel war. Moreover, orders were given on both sides not to give quarter to captives.

Each Anglo-Breton corps was attacked head on, one after the other, but the reserves restored the situation. The right wing of the Franco-Breton position was then counterattacked and driven back and since it was not being supported by its own reserves, it was folded up towards the centre. The left wing then folded in turn, the Count of Auxerre was captured, and the troops of Charles of Blois broke and fled. Charles, having been struck down by a lance, was finished off by an English soldier, obeying orders to show no quarter. Du Guesclin, having broken all his weapons, was obliged to surrender to the English commander Chandos. Du Guesclin was taken into custody and ransomed by Charles V for 100,000 francs.

== Consequences ==
This victory put an end to the war of succession. One year later, in 1365, under the first Treaty of Guérande, the king of France recognized John IV, the son of John of Montfort as duke of Brittany. (Note: Joanna, the widow of Charles of Blois, was permitted to retain the title Duchess of Brittany for the remainder of her life without power or the right to reign; she also retained her title as well as rights and properties as Countess of Penthievre suo jure.) However, John IV (Note: John of Montfort, John IV's father, had died early in the Breton War of Succession. The numbering of Breton Dukes differs between the British (English) and the French treatment because of the question of French recognition of John IV's father, John of Montfort as recognized Duke.) then paid homage to Charles V of France, rather than to his patron, Edward III of England. (Note: In 1360, Edward III of England had withdrawn his claim to be king of France, only to renew it in 1369.) The Anglo-Breton military victory appeared to result in a diplomatic coup for the King of France.
