= Bambecque =

Bambecque Bambeke
- Commune
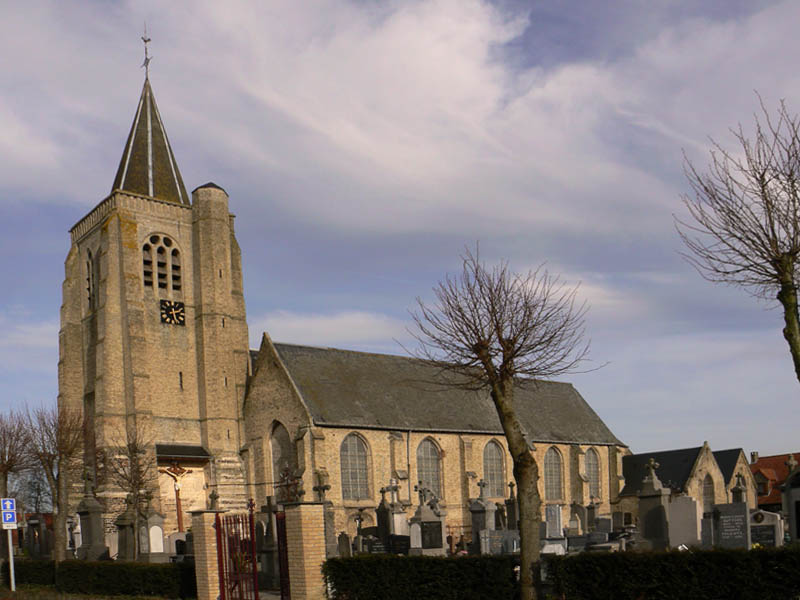
- The church in Bambecque

- Coat of arms
- Location of Bambecque
- Location within France Location within Hauts-de-France
- Coordinates: 50°54′05″N 2°32′55″E
- Country: France
- Region: Hauts-de-France
- Department: Nord
- Arrondissement: Dunkerque
- Canton: Wormhout
- Intercommunality: Hauts de Flandre

Government
  - Mayor (2020–2026): Grégoire Francke
- Area^{1}: 11.81 km^{2} (4.56 sq mi)
- Elevation: 8 m (26 ft)
- Highest elevation: 24 m (79 ft)
- Lowest elevation: 2 m (6.6 ft)
- Population (2023): 845
  - Density: 71.5/km^{2} (185/sq mi)
- Time zone: UTC+01:00 (CET)
  - Summer (DST): UTC+02:00 (CEST)
- INSEE/Postal code: 59046 /59470
- ^{1} French Land Register data, which excludes lakes, ponds, glaciers > 1 km^{2} (0.386 sq mi or 247 acres) and river estuaries.

Bambecque (French pronunciation: [bɑ̃bɛk]; Dutch: Bambeke) is a commune in the Nord department in northern France.

== Etymology ==
Bambecque has historically been attested as Banbeca in 1164. The toponym Bambecque is of Germanic origin, deriving from a Low German dialect, ultimately from Proto-West-Germanic *ban. Within the Nord and Pas-de-Calais departments, the Germanic hydronym *-bak(i) entered the French language via Low German, and took on two forms: the Germanic form -beek and Romance -becque (also -bec, -becques).

== Population ==
Historical population
Year	Pop.	±% p.a.
1968	642	—
1975	614	−0.64%
1982	614	+0.00%
1990	589	−0.52%
1999	655	+1.19%
2007	711	+1.03%
2012	747	+0.99%
2017	770	+0.61%
2023	845	+1.56%
Source: INSEE

== Heraldry ==
Arms of Bambecque	The arms of Bambecque are blazoned : Argent, a lion sable, armed and langued gules. (The arms of Bambecque, Crochte, Killem and Maing are essentially the same)

== Points of interest ==
- Jardin botanique du Val d'Yser

== See also ==
- Communes of the Nord department
