= Guy I of Blois =

French noble

Guy I of Châtillon
- Count of Blois
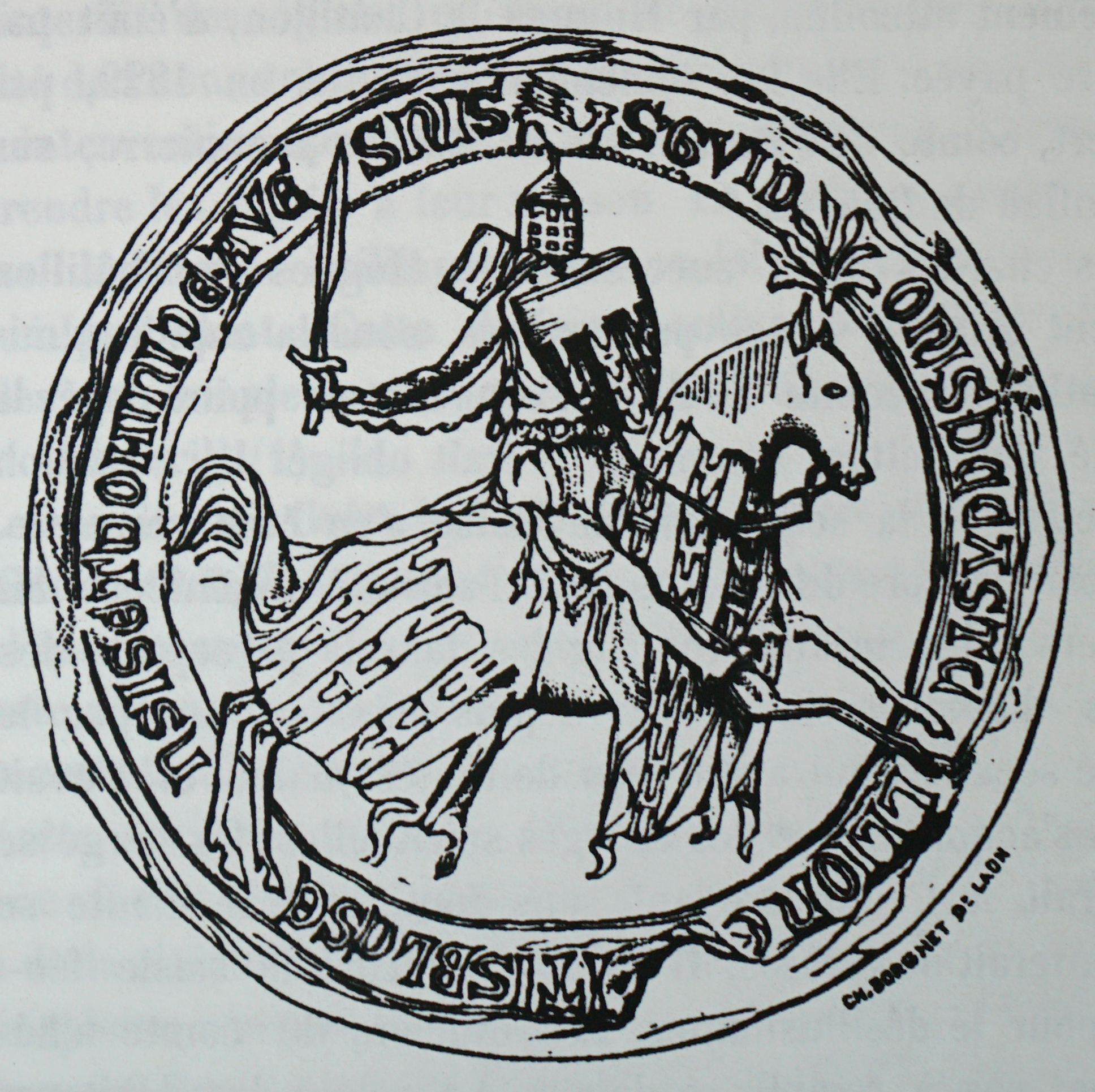
- Seal of Guy I of Châtillon, Count of Blois and Lord of Avesnes, 1327

Count of Blois and Dunois
- Reign: 1307 – 12 August 1342
- Predecessor: Hugh II of Châtillon
- Successor: Louis II
- Died: 12 August 1342
- Buried: Abbaye de la Guiche
- Noble family: House of Châtillon
- Spouse: Margaret of Valois
- Issue: Louis II, Count of Blois; Charles, Duke of Brittany; Marie of Blois
- Father: Hugh II of Châtillon
- Mother: Beatrix of Dampierre

Guy I of Châtillon, Count of Blois (died 12 August 1342), son of Hugh II of Châtillon and Beatrix of Dampierre, was Count of Blois and Lord of Avesnes 1307–1342.

== Marriage and issue ==
In 1310, he married Margaret of Valois, daughter of Charles of Valois and sister of Philip VI of France. They had:

- Louis II, Count of Blois (d. 1346)
- Charles of Blois (d. 1364) - would marry Joanna, Duchess of Brittany; Charles and the French would engage in the Breton War of Succession against the House of Montfort and the English
- Marie of Blois, married in 1334 Rudolph, Duke of Lorraine (d. 1346), married secondly Frederick VII, Count of Leiningen-Dagsburg.

Guy took part in the expedition of Louis X of France against Robert III of Flanders in 1315. During the early stages of the Hundred Years' War, he supported the Valois monarchy, to which he was closely connected through his wife, Margaret of Valois.

== Sources ==
- Bogdan, Henry (2007). La Lorraine des Ducs (in French). Perrin.
- Lalou, Elisabeth; Bautier, Robert Henri; Maillard, François (2007). Itinéraire de Philippe IV le Bel (1285-1314): Introduction (in French). Académie des inscriptions et belles lettres.
- de Venette, Jean (1953). Newhall, Richard A. (ed.). The Chronicle of Jean de Venette. Translated by Birdsall, Jean. Columbia University Press.
- Wagner, John A., ed. (2006). "Charles of Blois, Duke of Brittany". Encyclopedia of the Hundred Years War. Greenwood Press.

French nobility
Preceded by Hugh II	Count of Blois and Dunois; 1307–1342	Succeeded by Louis II
