= Charles, Count of Valois =

French prince and nobleman (1270–1325)

Charles
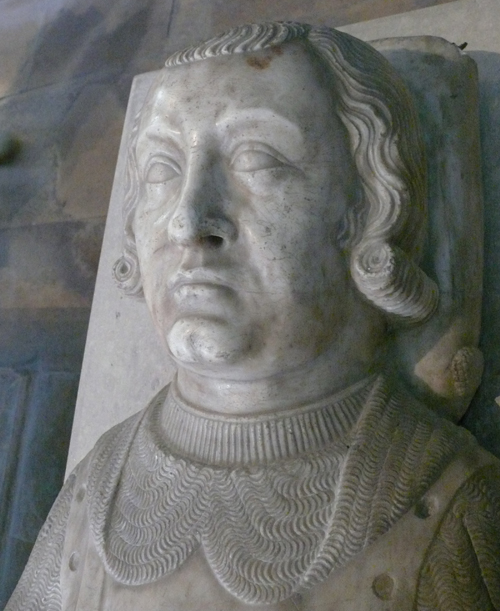
- Effigy of Charles of Valois, Basilica of Saint-Denis

Count of Valois
- Reign: 1284–1325
- Successor: Philip the Fortunate

Count of Anjou
- Reign: 1290–1325
- Predecessor: Charles II
- Successor: Philip I
- Co-ruler: Margaret (1290–1299)

Latin Emperor of Constantinople
- Reign: 1301–1307
- Predecessor: Catherine I (as sole ruler)
- Successor: Catherine II
- Co-ruler: Catherine I
- Born: 12 March 1270
- Died: 16 December 1325 (aged 55); Nogent-le-Roi
- Burial: St. Denis
- Spouses: Margaret, Countess of Anjou (m. 1290; died 1299) Catherine I, Latin Empress (m. 1301; died 1307) Mahaut of Châtillon (m. 1308)
- Issue Among others...: Philip VI, King of France; Joan, Countess of Hainaut; Margaret, Countess of Blois; Charles II, Count of Alençon; Catherine II, Latin Empress; Joanna, Countess of Artois; Maria, Duchess of Calabria; Isabella, Duchess of Bourbon; Blanche, Queen of Germany and Bohemia
- House: Capet; Valois (founder)
- Father: Philip III of France
- Mother: Isabella of Aragon

Charles (12 March 1270 – 16 December 1325), count of Valois, was a member of the House of Capet and founder of the House of Valois, which ruled over France from 1328 to 1589. He was the fourth son of King Philip III of France and Isabella of Aragon.

Charles ruled several principalities. He held in appanage the counties of Valois, Alençon (1285), and Perche. He became Count of Anjou and Maine through his first marriage to Margaret, Countess of Anjou. Through his second marriage to Catherine I, Latin Empress of Constantinople, he was titular Latin Emperor of Constantinople from 1301 to 1307, although he ruled from exile and only had authority over Crusader States in Greece.

As the grandson of King Louis IX of France, Charles of Valois was a son, brother, brother-in-law and son-in-law of kings or queens (of France, Navarre, England and Naples), and was the heir presumptive to the throne of France from 1322 to 1324 and then again from 1324 until his death in 1325. His descendants, the House of Valois, would become the royal house of France three years after his death, beginning with his eldest son King Philip VI of France.

== Life ==
Besides holding in appanage the counties of Valois, Alençon and Perche, Charles became in 1290 the Count of Anjou and of Maine by his first marriage with Margaret of Anjou, the eldest daughter of King Charles II of Naples, titular King of Sicily; by a second marriage that he contracted with the heiress of Emperor Baldwin II of Constantinople, last Latin emperor of Constantinople, he also had pretensions to the throne of Constantinople.

From his early years, Charles of Valois dreamed of more and sought all his life for a crown he never obtained. Starting in 1284, Pope Martin IV recognized him as King of Aragon (under the vassalage of the Holy See), as the son of his mother, Isabella of Aragon, in opposition to King Peter III of Aragon, who after the conquest of the island of Sicily was an enemy of the Papacy. Charles hence married Margaret, the daughter of the Neapolitan king, in order to re-enforce his position in Sicily which was supported by the Pope. Thanks to this Aragonese Crusade undertaken by his father King Philip III against the advice of his elder brother Philip IV, he believed he would win a kingdom and however won nothing but the ridicule of having been crowned with a cardinal's hat in 1285, which gave him the alias of the "King of the Cap." He would never dare to use the royal seal which was made on this occasion and had to renounce the title.

Amid the Gascon and Franco-Flemish Wars, Charles commanded effectively in Flanders in 1297.

=== Campaign in Italy and Invasion of Sicily ===
Dreaming of an imperial crown, in 1301 Charles married the titular empress of Constantinople, Catherine of Courtenay. The marriage drew Charles closer to the papacy, as his new marriage needed the connivance of Pope Boniface VIII. Boniface saw Charles as a potential ally and tool to further papal influence; the pope desired to re-install a Catholic ruler on the throne of the Byzantine Empire and thus revive the Latin Empire, which Charles now had a claim to. Boniface was also eager to end the nearly 20-year long war between the papacy, Angevin Naples, and Sicily, and so hoped to have Charles' army invade Sicily.

Named papal vicar, Charles of Valois led a private French army into Italy. However, he soon lost himself in the complexity of Italian politics, namely the generational feud between the Guelphs and Ghibellines. Local nobles and church officials used his army as a tool against their political rivals, and men under his command massacred a crowd in Florence. When his army landed on the shores of Sicily in May 1302, it faced heavy resistance from the Sicilian population. Charles' army pushed inland, but became mired in attritional warfare in the hot Sicilian summer; after a disastrous attempt to besiege Sciacca, Charles' army found itself out of supplies and surrounded on the southern coast of Sicily. Rather than see his army destroyed, Charles negotiated the Peace of Caltabellotta with the Sicilian leadership, thus ending the war of the Vespers. The Sicilian campaign had been a disaster; Charles' battered army had been forced to evacuate the island without having fought a major battle, and the treaty ended Angevin and papal attempts to re-conquer Sicily.

==== Charles of Valois and Byzantium ====
After his marriage to Catherine, Charles decided to reclaim his wife's empire. To fulfil this eastern ambition he had to secure the support of all those influential political figures of the time. The first and foremost was his brother, Philip IV of France.

Indeed, Philip promised to help his brother and gave assurances that he would do so by offering him some money, but in reality, he was too enmeshed in the war with Flanders which was at a critical point as the French had suffered a major disaster at the battle of Courtrai in 1302 to seriously consider a crusader expedition to Byzantium, not least his conflict with pope Boniface VIII which erupted in 1302. Boniface VIII's publication of the bull Unam Sanctam in November 1302 which asserted the papal supremacy precipitated the crisis with the king of France. Following the publication of the bull Philip IV went on to publish a series of forged letters dated on 5 December to induce the national feeling of the French clergy and people. To be sure, the French king and his officials Guillame de Nogaret and Guillame de Plaisians condemned the pope in two assemblies that took place in March and June 1303 in Paris in front of the French the prelature and nobility. On his behalf Charles of Valois tried to mediate the situation between his brother and the pope but to no avail. The "outrage of Anagni" followed and the death of pope Boniface VIII thereon.

While in Sicily, where he negotiated the Peace of Caltabellotta, Charles of Valois confirmed and renewed an anti-Byzantine treaty with Charles II, king of Naples in Viterbo, on 11 March 1302. Charles then turned to the Robert II, Duke of Burgundy who, after having inherited from his father Hugh IV the rights to the kingdom of Thessalonica, conferred on the latter in 1266 by Baldwin II, the Latin emperor, had started showing interest on the matter by 1303. The son of Robert II, Hugh in the meantime swore allegiance to the titular empress Catherine of Courtenay, wife of Charles of Valois and on March 24, 1303 he became affianced to their daughter Catherine of Valois. Necessary precondition for this marriage alliance to take place was the young man to promise the recovery of his prospective wife inheritance and his future "kingdom". Some two years later in January 1305 the couple, Charles of Valois and Catherine of Courtenay confirmed Hugh V, Duke of Burgundy as in possession of the kingdom of Thessalonica. Insofar as Charles of Valois might really recover Constantinople the marriage of the issue of Valois-Courtenay and the confirmation of Hugh were of significance to the House of Burgundy because that would eventually make Hugh an emperor. That potential relationship to work, however, needed first the investment in material support with men and money from the House of Burgundy.

As any other crusader expedition such a plan needed papal endorsement and a plan for the conquest of Constantinople was no less a crusade since the Greeks were heretics and schismatics, thus the project was a very desirable enterprise and the pope was more favourable than not to such a possibility. On the other hand, the fall of Acre in 1291 to the Mamluks had reinvigorated crusader zeal in Western Europe and countless theoretic crusading projects were published and presented to successive popes for that matter from 1291 up to 1330. A profound discrepancy of objectives surfaces here which meant that the pope had to be convinces for such a crucial shift to take the stead of the primary enterprise, the recapture of Jerusalem. Thus, Charles of Valois requested the aid of the new pope, Benedict XI. His shortlived papacy did not amount to anything more than the grant of a tithe. The situation took a decisive turn in January 1305 with the election of Pope Clement V, who, as a French himself, was well disposed towards the royal house of France and eager to restore good relations with Philip IV and his family. With a rather positive climate of peace and cooperation with Philip IV, Clement V and Charles of Valois expedited things in approximately two years time and the crusade now seemed more than merely plausible. Suffice here to note that the stance of emperor Andronikos II Palaiologos who repudiated the Union of the churches that had been proclaimed at the Second Council of Lyons in 1274, offered the necessary justification to set in motion the papal propaganda machinery. That reason along with the faltered policies of the emperor in Asia Minor established the meaningful link that saw the recapture of Jerusalem as the afterthought of an elevated morale. Significantly, however, it had translated the wishful expedition of Charles of Valois to a crusade project which he eventually proclaimed.

The papal support aside, Charles of Valois had to win the maritime powers of Venice and Genoa since the insurmountable problem of his project was the logistics. Clement V mediated to Venice by writing to Doge Pietro Gradenigo, exhorting him to help Charles and tried to lure him into the latter's project by offering the privileges of the crusaders should they participate. By the same token he also wrote to Genoa advising them that the time had come for the Greeks to be brought back to the true faith. On his behalf Charles of Valois sent his emissaries to Genoa to appeal for assistance and to get a quote for the shipping costs of his prospective campaign and whether the commune was interested in allowing Charles to hire those ships. Genoa's interest by this time and on the face of its imperiled position in the East by the Catalan Company had been inseparable from those of the empire of Constantinople, so the decline of Charles' request in 1306 was the only possible stance. On the contrary, Venice, being hostile to the empire and Genoa alike, accepted Charles of Valois's proposals which culminated in a treaty on 19 December 1306. To further aid the cause, the pope on 3 June 1307 excommunicated Andronikos II and warned the rest of the Catholic powers that they too were facing excommunication should they help the emperor, not least forfeit their property to the church.

The European alliances notwithstanding, Charles of Valois tried to secure backing for his plans from various powers in the East, that is the Catalan Company which was a redoubtable army to be reckoned with as time and again it had proved. The Company's frivolous allegiance to Frederick III allowed for its opportunism as did the lack of competent leadership. Indeed, under their new leader at the time, Berengar de Rocafort, the Catalan Company became a vassal of Charles of Valois in summer of 1307. This development conditioned the attitude of the Serbs, who under their king Stephen Uroš II Milutin established connections with Charles of Valois that culminated in the treaty of Lys on 27 March 1308. Last in this broader scheme of allies to enter were the malcontents in the empire of Constantinople, genuine unionists, enemies of Andronikos II and men who feared more the Turks than they did the French. The documented negotiations with these Byzantine supporters lasted from summer 1307 to spring 1310 and some of their names are known: John and Constantine Monomachos, siblings of whom the former was the commander of the armed forces of Thessaloniki, a certain Constantine Limpidaris identifiable with the megas stratopedarches and protovestiarios Libadarios, and the monk Sophonias. Concurrently to these four, the archbishop of Andrianople Theoktistos was also of some import to the negotiations with Charles of Valois as he appears to have been in Paris for over five months for that matter. Understandably, the prime concern behind those figures' action was to find an able defender for the Asia Minor front against Turkish aggressiveness, and their best possible candidate at that particular time was apparently Charles of Valois. The conclusion of his eastern alliances came with the unionist fraction of the Armenian kingdom, that requested for Charles's help and made certain concessions to the Roman Catholic church by 1307.

Charles's expedition was to be launched between March 1307 and March 1308. However, after 1308 there was a diminution of diplomatic activity and gradual abandonment of his plans of conquest, which in part was owed to the candidature he was offered for the throne of the Holy Roman Empire after the German king's assassination in 1308. Besides, the death of wife Catherine of Courtenay in the same year played substantial role and along with a number of events that had occurred in the meantime weighted heavy towards the abort of the plan.

=== Claimant to German throne and the politics of the French court ===
Charles was back in shape to seek a new crown when the German King Albert I of Germany was murdered in 1308. Charles's brother King Philip IV, who did not wish to take the risk himself of a check and probably thought that a French puppet on the imperial throne would be a good thing for France, encouraged him. The candidacy was defeated with the election of Henry VII of Luxembourg as German king, for the electors did not want France to become even more powerful. Charles thus continued to dream of the eastern crown of the Courtenays.

He did benefit from the affection which his brother King Philip, who had suffered from the remarriage of their father, brought to his only full brother, and Charles thus found himself given responsibilities which largely exceeded his talent. Thus it was he who directed, in 1311, the royal embassy to the conferences of Tournai with the Flemish; he quarreled there with his brother's chamberlain Enguerrand de Marigny, who openly defied him. Charles did not pardon the affront and would continue the vendetta against Marigny after his brother King Philip's death.

In 1314, Charles of Valois was doggedly opposed to the torture of Jacques de Molay, grand master of the Templars.

The premature death of Charles's nephew, King Louis X of France, in 1316, gave Charles hopes for a political role. However, he could not prevent his nephew (Louis X's younger brother) Philip the Tall from taking the regency while awaiting the birth of Louis's posthumous child. Louis's son died a few days after his birth, and Philip took the throne as King Philip V. Charles was initially opposed to Philip's succession, for Philip's elder brother had left behind a daughter, Joan of France, his only surviving child. However, Charles later switched sides and eventually backed his nephew Philip, probably realizing that Philip's precedent would bring him and his line closer to the throne.

=== War against England ===
In 1324, Charles commanded with success the army of his nephew, King Charles IV of France (who succeeded his elder brother King Philip V in 1322), to take Guyenne and Flanders from King Edward II of England. He contributed, by the capture of several cities, to accelerate the peace, which was concluded between the King of France and his sister Isabella, the queen-consort of England as the wife of King Edward II.

The Count of Valois died on 16 December 1325 at Nogent-le-Roi, leaving a son who would take the throne of France under the name of Philip VI and commence the branch of the Valois. Had he survived for three more years and outlived his nephew King Charles IV, Charles might have become king of France. Charles was buried in the now-demolished church of the Couvent des Jacobins in Paris – his effigy is now in the Basilica of St Denis.

== Marriages and children ==
Charles was married three times.

His first marriage in August 1290, was to Margaret, Countess of Anjou and Maine (1272–1299), daughter of King Charles II of Naples. They had the following children:

- Isabella of Valois (1292–1309); married John, who would become Duke of Brittany.
- Philip VI of France (1293 – 22 August 1350), first king of the Valois Dynasty.
- Joan of Valois, Countess of Hainaut (1294 – 7 March 1342); married Count William I of Hainaut and had issue.
- Margaret of Valois, Countess of Blois (1295 – July 1342); married Count Guy I of Blois, and had issue.
- Charles II, Count of Alençon (1297 – 26 August 1346 at the Battle of Crécy), also Count of Perche, Chatres and Joigny. Married firstly Jeanne de Joigny, Countess of Joigny, and secondly Marie de la Cerda, the youngest daughter of Fernando de la Cerda, Lord of Lara.
- Catherine (1299 – died young).

In 1302 he married Catherine I of Courtenay (1274–1307), titular Latin Empress of Constantinople. She was the daughter of Philip I, Emperor of Constantinople. They had:

- John (1302–1308), Count of Chartres.
- Catherine II of Valois (1303 – October 1346), succeeded as titular Empress of Constantinople and Princess of Achaea. She married Prince Philip I of Taranto and had issue.
- Joan of Valois, Countess of Beaumont-le-Roger (1304 – 9 July 1363); married Robert III of Artois, Count of Beaumont-le-Roger and had issue.
- Isabelle of Valois (1305 – 11 November 1349), Abbess of Fontevrault.

Finally, in 1308, he married Mahaut of Châtillon (1293–1358), daughter of Guy IV of Châtillon, Count of Saint-Pol. They had:

- Marie of Valois, Duchess of Calabria (1309 – 28 October 1332); married Duke Charles of Calabria and had issue.
- Isabella of Valois, Duchess of Bourbon (1313 – 26 July 1383). She married Duke Peter I of Bourbon.
- Blanche of Valois, Queen of Germany and Bohemia (1317–1348); married King Charles IV of Germany and Bohemia who later became Holy Roman Emperor after her death. She was sometimes called "Marguerite".
- Louis (1318 – 2 November 1328), Count of Chartres and Lord of Châteauneuf-en-Thymerais.

Royal families involved in the Hundred Years' War (1337–1453)

Valois (Capet)	Plantagenet	Blois	Capet	Évreux (Capet)
Charles; Count of Valois	Edward I "Longshanks"; King of England r. 1272–1307	Joan I Queen of Navarre r. 1274–1305	Philip IV "the Fair"; King of France r. 1285–1314; Philip I King of Navarre r. 1284–1305	Louis; Count of Évreux
Edward II; King of England r. 1307–1327	Isabella "She-Wolf of France"	Louis X King of France r. 1314–1316; Louis I King of Navarre r. 1305–1316	Philip V "the Tall"; King of France; Philip II; King of Navarre r. 1316–1322	Charles IV "the Fair"; King of France; Charles I "the Bald"; King of Navarre r. 1322–1328	Joan of Évreux
Philip VI "the Fortunate" "of Valois"; King of France r. 1328–1350	Joan of Valois	John I "the Posthumous"; King of France; King of Navarre r. 1316	Joan II; Queen of Navarre r. 1328–1349	Philip III "the Noble" "the Wise"; King of Navarre jure uxoris r. 1328–1343
John II "the Good"; King of France r. 1350–1364	Philippa of Hainault	Edward III; King of England r. 1327–1377	Joan of the Tower	David II; King of Scotland r. 1329–1371	Charles II "the Bad"; King of Navarre r. 1349–1387
Charles V "the Wise"; King of France r. 1364–1380	Philip the Bold; Duke of Burgundy	Edward of Woodstock "The Black Prince"	John of Gaunt	Edmund of Langley; Duke of York
Luxembourg
Charles VI "the Beloved" "the Mad"; King of France r. 1380–1422	Louis I Duke of Orléans	Charles IV; Holy Roman Emperor r. 1355–1378	Henry IV; King of England r. 1399–1413
Charles VII "the Victorious"; King of France r. 1422–1461	Isabella of Valois	Richard II; King of England r. 1377–1399	Anne of Bohemia	Catherine of Valois	Henry V King of England r. 1413–1422	Thomas of Lancaster; Duke of Clarence †Battle of Baugé
Henry VI; King of England r. 1422–1461, r. 1470–1471

== In fiction ==
Charles is a major character in Les Rois maudits (The Accursed Kings), a series of French historical novels by Maurice Druon. He was portrayed by Jean Deschamps in the 1972 French miniseries adaptation of the series, and by Jacques Spiesser in the 2005 adaptation.

Daemon Targaryen from A Song of Ice and Fire draws significant inspiration from Charles. Both are the troublesome younger brother to a king who sets off to gain a crown of his own, only for his son to inherit the crown after his three nephews die off without male heirs. According to author George R. R. Martin, The Accursed Kings is a major influence on his own series.

== Sources ==
- Casteen, Elizabeth (2015). From She-Wolf to Martyr: The Reign and Disputed Reputation of Johanna I of Naples. Cornell University Press.
- Colomer Pérez, Guifré, «Rex Karolus sine regno»: la imposición de Carlos de Valois como rey de Aragón en 1285, según las crónicas, en El Camino del medievalista. Nuevos Trabajos en Estudios Medievales. ‘Renovatio ordinis’, 2024, p. 65-92. https://doi.org/10.15304/me.2024.1737
- Doubleday, Simon R. (2001). The Lara Family: Crown and Nobility in Medieval Spain. Harvard University Press.
- Hallam, Elizabeth (1980). Capetian France: 987–1328. Longman Group UK.
- Hand, Joni M. (2013). Women, Manuscripts and Identity in Northern Europe, 1350–1550. Ashgate Publishing.
- Housley, Norman (1992). The later Crusades, 1274–1580: from Lyons to Alcazar. Oxford University Press.
- Jackson-Laufer, Guida Myrl (1999). Women Rulers Throughout the Ages: An Illustrated Guide. ABC-CLIO.
- Lewis, P. S. (1965). "War, Propaganda and Historiography in Fifteenth-Century France and England". Transactions of the Royal Historical Society. 15. Cambridge University Press: 1–21. doi:10.2307/3678814. JSTOR 3678814. S2CID 162671794.
- Lock, Peter (2013). The Franks in the Aegean: 1204–1500. Routledge.
- Russell, Delbert W. (2013). "The Cultural Context of the French Prose "remaniement" of the Life of Edward the Confessor by a nun of Barking Abbey". In Wogan-Browne, Jocelyn (ed.). Language and Culture in Medieval Britain: The French of England, c. 1100–c. 1500. Boydell & Brewer.
- Small, Carola M. (2004). "Charles of Valois". In Kleinhenz, Christopher (ed.). Medieval Italy: An Encyclopedia. Routledge.
- Taylor, Craig, ed. (2006). Debating the Hundred Years War. Vol. 29. Cambridge University Press.
- Topping, Peter (1975). "The Morea, 1311–1364". In Setton, Kenneth M.; Hazard, Harry W. (eds.). A History of the Crusades, Volume III: The Fourteenth and Fifteenth Centuries. Vol. 3. Madison and London: University of Wisconsin Press. pp. 104–140. ISBN 0-299-06670-3.
- de Venette, Jean (1953). Newhall, Richard A. (ed.). The Chronicle of Jean de Venette. Translated by Birdsall, Jean. Columbia University Press.
- Wood, Charles T. (1966). The French Apanages and the Capetian Monarchy: 1224–1328. Harvard University Press.
- Laiou, Angeliki E. (1972). Constantinople and the Latins. The Foreign Policy of Andronicus II 1282-1328. Cambridge, Massachusetts, Harvard University Press.
- Petit, Joseph (1900). Charles of Valois, 1275-1325, Paris (Alphonse Picard et fils) ().

Titles in pretence
Preceded by Catherine I	— TITULAR — Latin Emperor; 1301–1307 with Catherine I	Succeeded by Catherine II
French nobility
Preceded by Charles II	Count of Maine; 1290–1314 with Margaret (1290–1299)	Succeeded by Philip
Preceded by Charles II	Count of Anjou; 1290–1325 with Margaret (1290–1299)	Succeeded by Philip
Vacant Title last held by John Tristan	Count of Valois; 1284–1325	Succeeded by Philip
Vacant Title last held by Peter	Count of Alençon; 1291–1325	Succeeded by Charles II
Vacant Title last held by Joan	Count of Chartres; 1293–1325	Succeeded by John II
