= Les Forges, Morbihan =

Les Forges Ar Govelioù
- Part of Forges de Lanouée
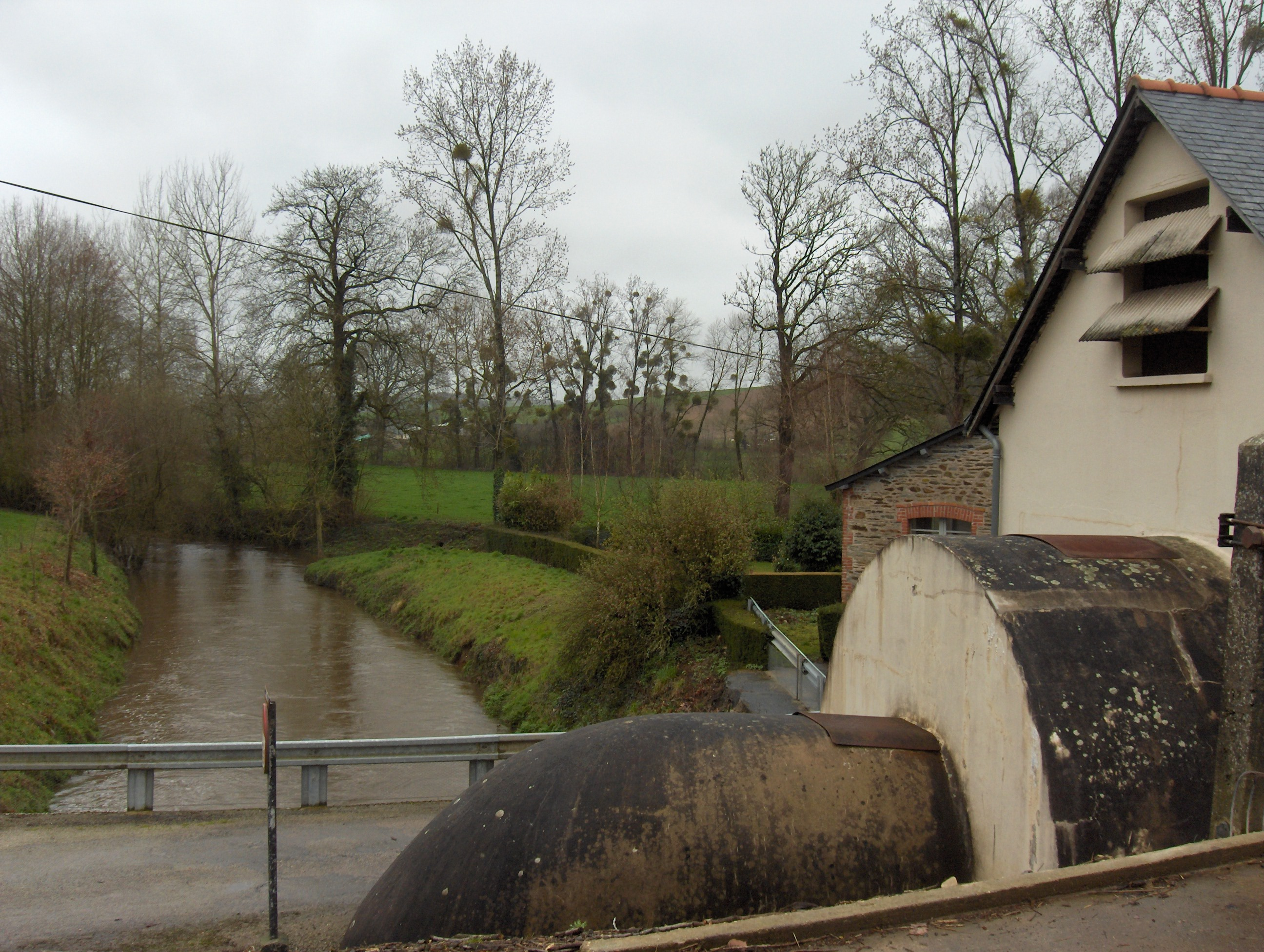
- A drainage channel at Les Forges de Lanouée
- Location of Les Forges
- Location within France Location within Brittany
- Coordinates: 48°01′08″N 2°38′45″W
- Country: France
- Region: Brittany
- Department: Morbihan
- Arrondissement: Pontivy
- Canton: Ploërmel
- Commune: Forges de Lanouée
- Area^{1}: 52.53 km^{2} (20.28 sq mi)
- Highest elevation: 123 m (404 ft)
- Lowest elevation: 40 m (130 ft)
- Population (2022): 434
  - Density: 8.26/km^{2} (21.4/sq mi)
- Time zone: UTC+01:00 (CET)
  - Summer (DST): UTC+02:00 (CEST)
- Postal code: 56120
- ^{1} French Land Register data, which excludes lakes, ponds, glaciers > 1 km^{2} (0.386 sq mi or 247 acres) and river estuaries.

Les Forges (French pronunciation: [le fɔʁʒ]; Breton: Ar Govelioù) is a former commune in the Morbihan department of Brittany in north-western France. On 1 January 2019, it was merged into the new commune Forges de Lanouée. Inhabitants of Les Forges are called in French Fargerons.

== See also ==
- Communes of the Morbihan department
