= Maing =

- Commune
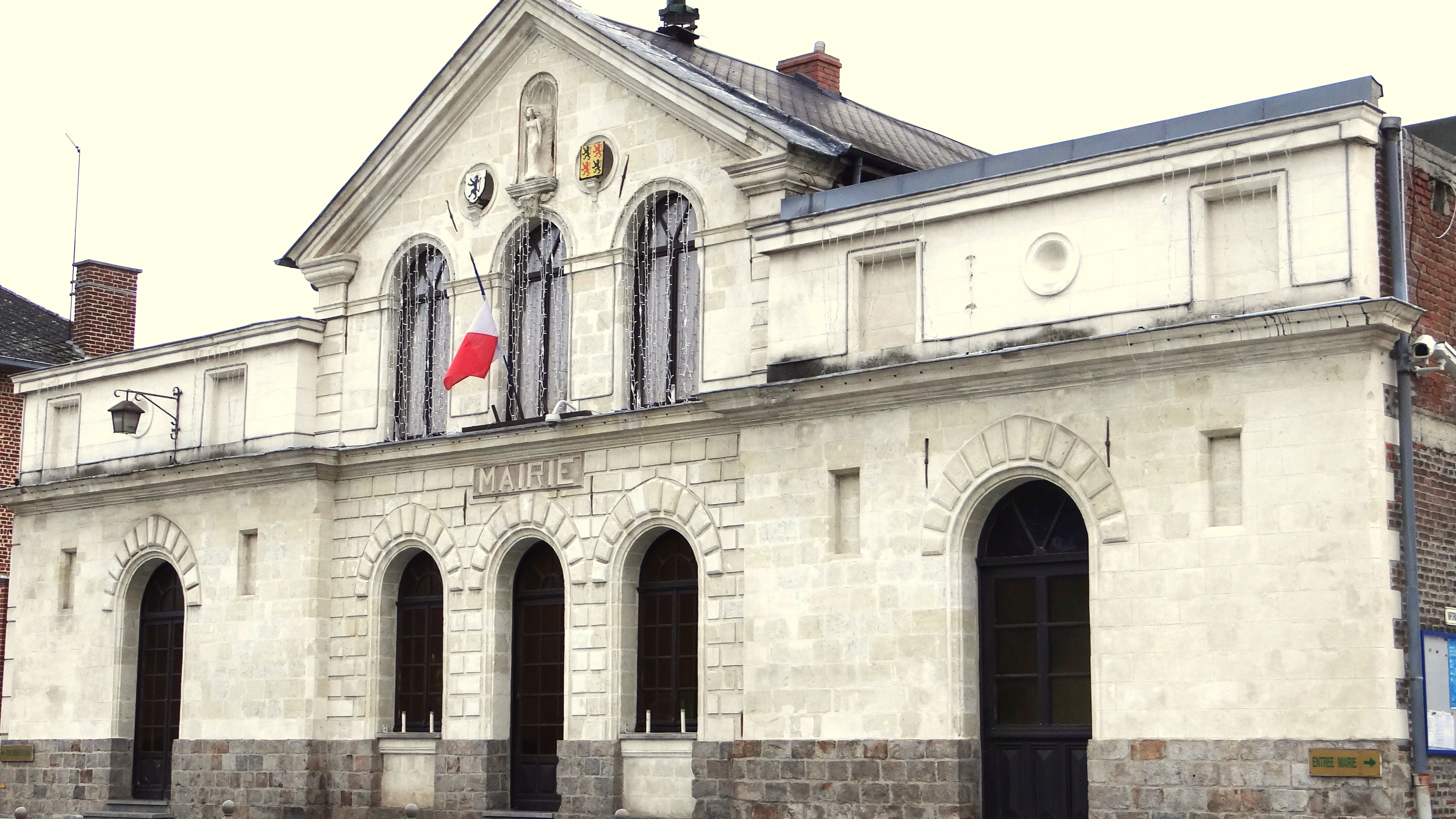
- The town hall in Maing

- Coat of arms
- Location of Maing
- Location within France Location within Hauts-de-France
- Coordinates: 50°18′32″N 3°29′10″E
- Country: France
- Region: Hauts-de-France
- Department: Nord
- Arrondissement: Valenciennes
- Canton: Aulnoy-lez-Valenciennes
- Intercommunality: CA Valenciennes Métropole

Government
  - Mayor (2020–2026): Philippe Baudrin
- Area^{1}: 11.68 km^{2} (4.51 sq mi)
- Elevation: 80 m (260 ft)
- Highest elevation: 90 m (300 ft)
- Lowest elevation: 24 m (79 ft)
- Population (2023): 3,954
  - Density: 338.5/km^{2} (876.8/sq mi)
- Time zone: UTC+01:00 (CET)
  - Summer (DST): UTC+02:00 (CEST)
- INSEE/Postal code: 59369 /59233
- ^{1} French Land Register data, which excludes lakes, ponds, glaciers > 1 km^{2} (0.386 sq mi or 247 acres) and river estuaries.

Maing (French pronunciation: [mɛ̃]) is a commune in the Nord department, northern France.

Fontenelle Abbey was located here.

== Population ==
Historical population
Year	Pop.	±% p.a.
1968	4,244	—
1975	4,483	+0.79%
1982	4,445	−0.12%
1990	4,183	−0.76%
1999	3,845	−0.93%
2007	3,944	+0.32%
2012	4,047	+0.52%
2017	4,112	+0.32%
2023	3,954	−0.65%
Source: INSEE

== Heraldry ==
Arms of Maing	The arms of Maing are blazoned : Argent, a lion sable, crowned Or, armed and langued gules. (The arms of Bambecque, Killem and Maing are essentially the same)

== See also ==
- Communes of the Nord department
