= Fontenelles Abbey =

Abbey in Vendée, France

Coordinates: 46°39′51″N 1°29′11″W

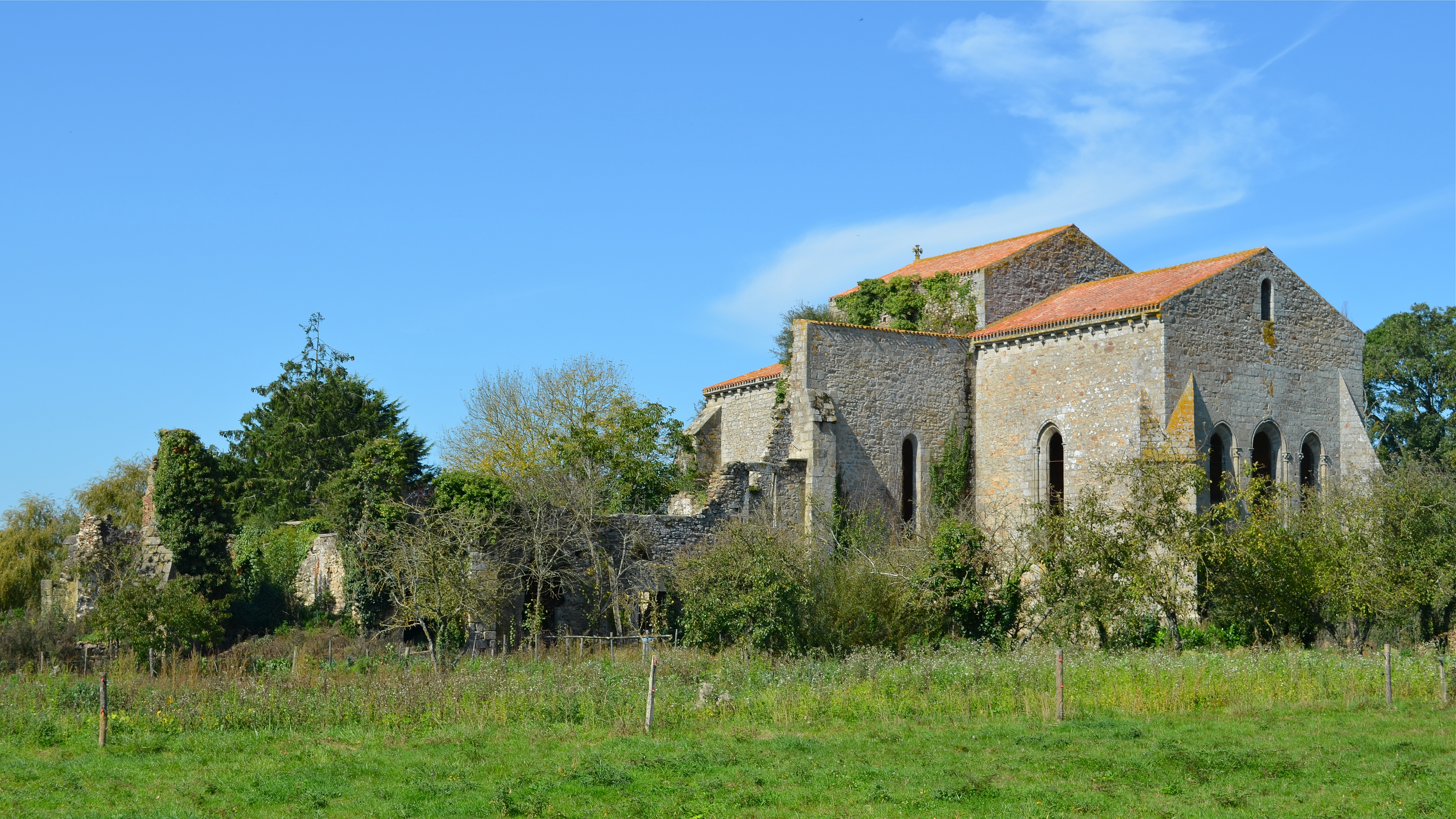
Overview of the abbey remains from the south

Fontenelles Abbey or Les Fontenelles Abbey (French: Abbaye des Fontenelles; Abbaye Notre-Dame des Fontenelles; Latin: Fontenellae, Fintanelum, Fontenacum or Fontenaeum) was an Augustinian monastery in the former commune of Saint-André-d'Ornay (incorporated into La Roche-sur-Yon in 1964), in the Vendée, France.

== History ==
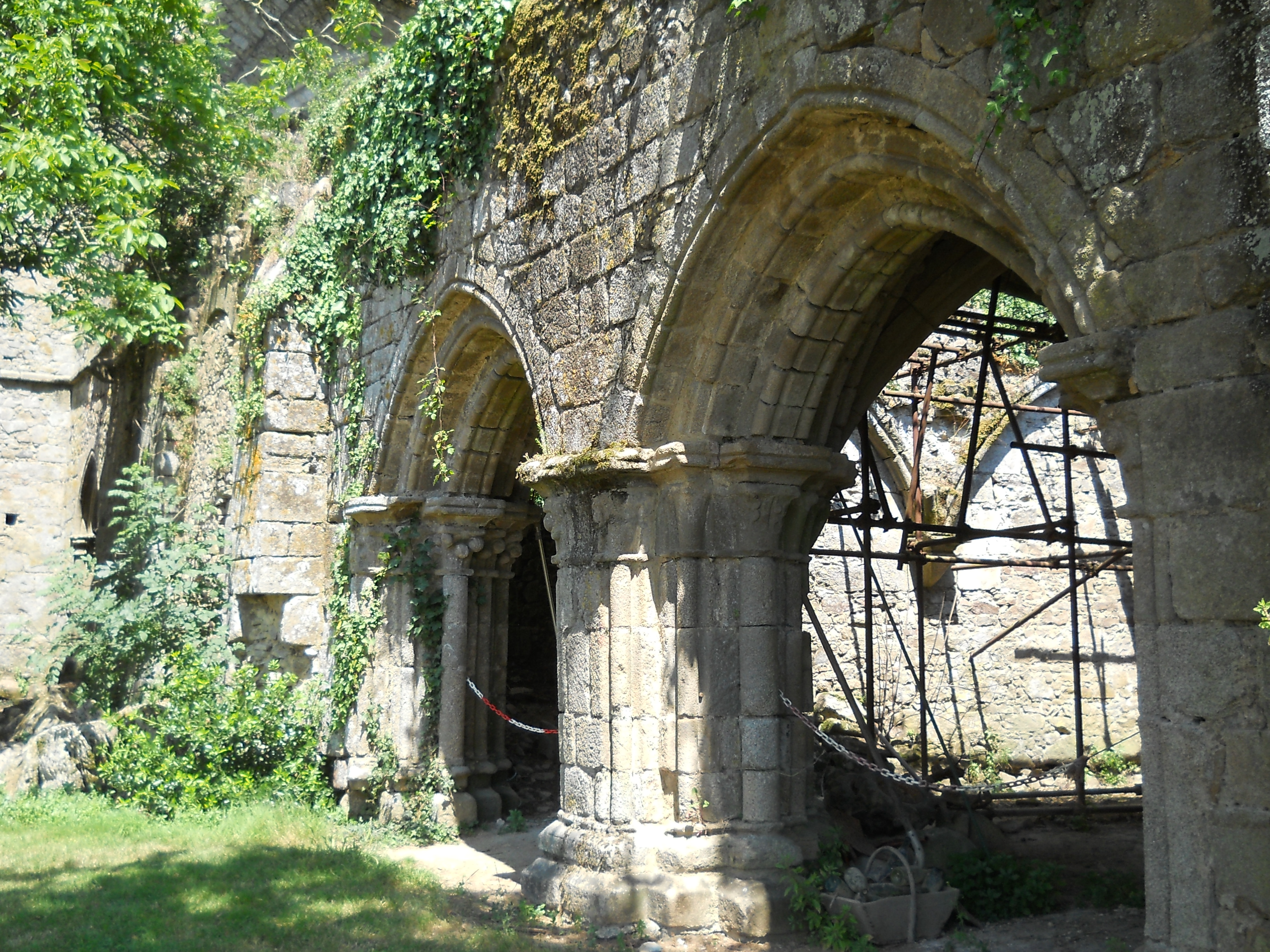
Entrance to the chapter room

The abbey was founded in 1210 by local landowners Guillaume de Mauléon, seigneur of Talmont-Saint-Hilaire, and his wife Béatrice de Machecoul, lady of the manors of La Roche-sur-Yon and Luçon. The monastery was originally Benedictine but after a lawsuit broke out between the abbot of Fontenelles and the abbot of Marmoutier, a prestigious Benedictine monastery, the community became Augustinian, as a daughter house of the nearby Chancelade Abbey, in about 1224. The church was dedicated in 1248 by Jean de Melun, bishop of Poitiers.

The last regular abbot died in 1487, after which the abbey passed into the hands of commendatory abbots. From 1632 the abbots of Chancelade shared in the governance of Fontenelles. From 1669 the community was taken on by the reformist Congrégation de France.

The church was damaged during the Hundred Years' War. In 1533 there were only 9 monks here. In 1562 during the Wars of Religion Protestants attacked the abbey, killing some of the monks, set it on fire and largely destroyed it. In particular they damaged the church to the extent that part of nave collapsed, leaving it permanently shortened, with a Greek cross floor plan. Protestants attacked it again in the 1620s but were forced to repair the damage. The monastery was restored from 1669 onwards by the canons of the Congrégation de France.

The abbey, by that time containing only three monks, was suppressed during the French Revolution in 1791. In 1794 the passage of the "infernal columns" through the Vendée left it entirely abandoned. The site was later used for agriculture: the church was turned into a barn and the abbot's lodging into accommodation for labourers. Continued neglect brought about the collapse of most of the remaining buildings including in 1935 the collapse of the south transept of what was left of the church. The site remains private property.

== Buildings ==
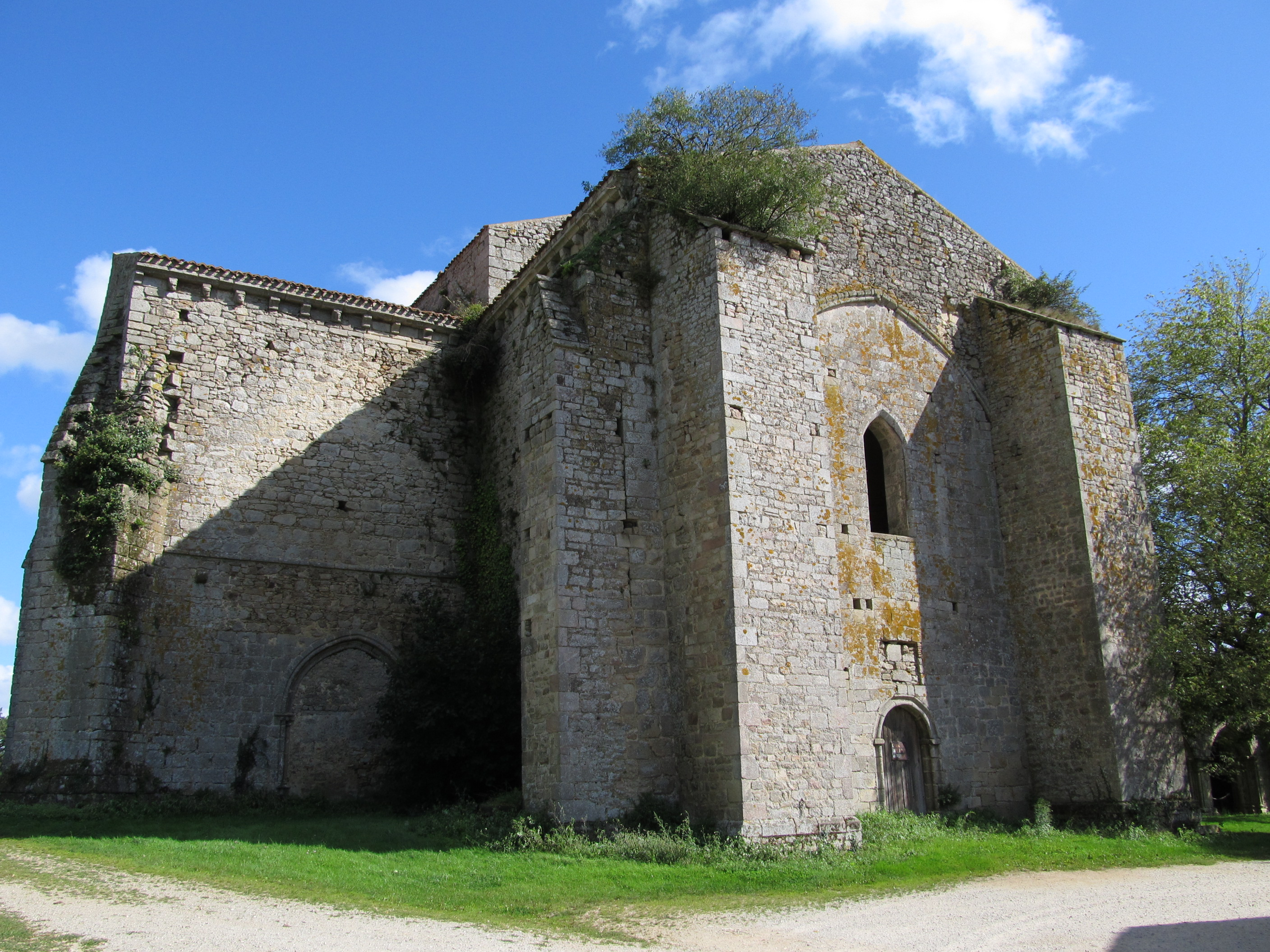
West end of the abbey church

The monastery was built in granite in the Angevin Gothic style, transitional between Romanesque and Gothic. The truncated church is the most intact structure remaining, and contains the tomb of either the foundress Béatrice de Machecoul or her daughter Jeanne, Vicomtesse de Thouars, consisting of a recumbent effigy (gisant) in an arched recess (arcosolium) with small figures. There are also substantial remains of the chapter room but the rest of the former structures are in ruins.
