= List of female hereditary monarchs =

This is a list of female hereditary monarchs who reigned over a political jurisdiction in their own right or by right of inheritance. The list does not include female regents (see List of regents), usually the mother of the monarch, for although they exercised political power during the period of regency on behalf of their child or children, they were not hereditary monarchs, and thus cannot be included in the list of female hereditary monarchs.

Each entry contains the name (with years of birth–death) and span of reign in years (where available). Where necessary, the source of inheritance right is indicated, that is, whether they succeeded from their fathers, mothers, siblings or other relatives. Cases where succession was obtained by other means (usurpation or marriage, for example) are also indicated accordingly.

== A ==
- Ada of Caria (fl. 377–326 BC) Queen of Caria
- Ada of Holland
- Adalais of Aquitaine, Viscountess of Auvillars and Lomagne
- Adelaide, Countess of Auxerre (1262–?)
- Adelaide I of Auxerre, Countess of Auxerre, 853–864
- Adelaide, Countess Palatine of Burgundy, Countess Palatine of Burgundy, 1248–79
- Adelaide of Burgundy, also known as Adelaide of Chalon (941–?), Countess of Troyes, Countess of Beaume, Countess of Chalon-sur-Saône
- Adelaide of India, Countess of Gien
- Adelaide of Normandy, Countess of Aumale, 1069–90
- Adelaide of Provence (d. 1129), also known as Adelaide of Forcalquier, Lady of Forcalquier, 1065–1129, Countess of Provence
- Adelaide of Soissons (d. 1066), Countess of
- Adelaide of Susa (1020–1091), Countess of Turin, Lady of Auriate, Bredulo, Asti, Alba, Albenga and Ventimiglia
- Adelaide of Vermandois (1065–1102), Countess of Valois, Countess of Vermandois
- Adelais, Lady of Venisy (d. 1221), Lady of Venisy
- Adelasia of Torres, Judge of Logudoro, 1236–59
- Adele of Anjou, Countess of Vendôme, 1016–32
- Adele of Valois, Countess of Valois, Countess of Crespy
- Adelheid of Heinsberg, Countess of Heinsberg
- Adelheid of Kyburg, Countess of Kyburg
- Adelheid of Gelder (d. after 1150), Heiress of the stewardship (Ger. vogtei) of the Bishopric of Munster
- Adelicia of Sanseverino, Lady of Serino, 1283–?
- Adeline of Meulan (1014–81), Countess of Meulan, ?–1081
- Adelvie of Guise, Lady of Guise
- Adrienne of Estouteville, also known as Adrienne of Bourbon, (1512–1560), Duchess of Estouteville, Lady of Hambye, Gace and Briquebec
- Adyle of Carlat, Viscountess of Carlat
- Aelis of Troyes (d. 1066), Countess of Troyes and Soissons
- Ælfwynn, Lady of the Mercians, 918–919
- Æthelflæd, Lady of the Mercians, 911–918
- Agalbursa, Judge of Arborea, c. 1186
- Agathe of Dammartin (d. 1268), Lady of Ponthieu
- Agathe of Poitiers-Valentinois, Lady of Baux, 1348–?
- Agnes de Percy, Heiress of the Percys
- Agnès de Tarroja inherited the Lordships of Solsona, Arbeca and Tarroja; wife of Ramon Folc IV, Viscount of Cardona
- Agnes of Adelon, Lady of Adelon, c. 1200
- Agnes of Austria (1322–1392), daughter of Leopold I, duchess in Silesia
- Agnes of Baudemont (1130–1210), Lady of Baudemont, La Fere-en-Tardenois and Longueville, Lady of Nesle, Lady of Pontarcy, Lady of Quincy, Countess of Braine
- Agnes of Bourbon (d. 1288), Lady of Bourbon
- Agnes of Burgundy, Countess of Montbeliard, 1332–?
- Agnes of Cleves (d. 1267), Heiress of Cleves and Heinsberg
- Agnes II of Donzy (1199–1225), Dame of Donzy, 1222–25
- Agnes of Faucigny (d. 1268), Lady of Faucigny
- Agnes of Gournay-sur-Marne (d. 1143), Lady of Rochefort, Lady of Gournay-sur-Marne and Gomets, Countess of Rochefort
- Agnes of Montferrat (1180–1208), Latin Empress of Constantinople
- Agnes I of Nevers, Countess of Auxerre and Nevers, 1181–92
- Agnes of Ponthieu (c. 1080–1105/1111), Countess of Ponthieu. 1100–bef. 1105
- Agnes of Thiern, also known as Alix of Thiern, Lady of Montpensier
- Ahhotep I (c. 1560–1530 BC), Queen of Egypt, regent for her son Ahmose I
- Ahilyabai Holkar Maharani (1725–1795) the Holkar Queen of the Maratha ruled Malwa kingdom, India
- Ahmose-Nefertari, Queen of Egypt, regent for her son Amenhotep I
- Aikaterina Asanina Zaccariaina (d. 1462), Titular Lady of Arcadia; Heiress of the Principality of Achaia
- Algayette, Lady
- Alheidis of Heinsberg (d. after 1207), Heinress of Heinsberg
- Alheidis of Sayn (d. c. 1303), Heiress of Hulchrath and Saffenberg (Daughter of Henry I of Sayn (d. 1259) and Agnes of Cleves (d. 1267), Heiress of Cleves and Heinsberg; married Dietrich VI of Cleves (d. 1275)
- Alice de la Roche-sur-l'Ognon (d. after 1277), Lady of Beirut
- Alice de Lacy (1281–1348), 4th Countess of Lincoln, 1311–48, 4th Countess of Salisbury, 1311–48, Countess of Lancaster, Leicester and Derby
- Alice Montague, 5th Countess of Salisbury
- Alice of Brittany (1243–1288), Lady of Pontarcy
- Alienor of Champagne, Countess of Bar-sur-Aube
- Alix de la Tour du Pin (v. 1280–1309), Dauphine of Viennois, 1307–09
- Alix of Alençon (d. after 1220), Lady of Montgomery
- Alix of Burgundy (1251–1290), Lady of Montjoy, Lady of Valencay, Countess of Auxerre, 1261–90
- Alix of Chacenay (d. 1278), Lady of Chacenay
- Alix of Clermont (d. 1330), Viscountess of Chateaudun
- Alix of Dammartin, Countess of Dammartin
- Alix of Dreux (1255–1296), Viscountess of Chateaudun, 1259–96, which she inherited from her mother Clemence of Chateaudun
- Alix of Dreux (1364–?), Viscountess of Dreux
- Alix of Dreux-Beu (1255–1275), Viscountess of Chateaudun, Lady of Montdoubleau
- Alix of Eu (d. 1246), Lady of Hastings and Countess of Eu, 1191–1246
- Alix of Flanders (1322–1346), Lady of Richebourg
- Alix of France (1160–1225), Lady of Arques, Countess of Eu and Vexins
- Alix of Meran, Countess Palatine of Burgundy, 1248–79
- Alix of Montfort (1218–1255), also known as Alix de Bigorre, Viscountess of Marsan and Countess of Bigorre, 1251–55
- Alix of Thouars, Countess of Richmond & Duchess of Brittany, 1203–21
- Almodis of La Marche (d. 1116), Countess of La Marche
- Alveradis of Saffenberg, Lady of Maubach
- Amalia of Dohna-Vianen (1645–1700), Sovereign Lady and Heiress of Vianen and Ameiden, Heiress Burgravine of Utrecht
- Amalie of Zweibrücken, Lady of Rixingen, 1547–77
- Ameline of Guise (1159–1185), Lady of Guise
- Amanirenas (40–10 BC) Queen regnant of Kush
- Amanishakheto (10 BC – 1 AD) Queen regnant of Kush
- Amastrine (d. 284 BC) ruler of Heraclea
- Amicia of Gloucester (1160–1225), Countess of Gloucester, 1217
- Amicia, Countess of Leicester, Countess of Leicester
- Amoene of Daun-Falkenstein, Heiress of Limburg
- Anastasia of Isenburg (1400–30), Heiress of Wied
- Andregota Galindez, Countess of Aragon, 922–925
- Anna of Jever, Lady of Jever, 1511–36
- Anna of Kyburg, Countess of Kyburg
- Anna of Stolberg (d. 1436), Countess of Stolberg
- Anna of Tecklenburg (1527–1582), Heiress of Tecklenburg and Rheda
- Anna of Wevelinghoven, Heiress of Wevelinghoven and Lievendael
- Anna Anachoutlou Komnena, Empress of Trebizond, 1341, 1341–42
- Anna Balbo Lascaris (1487–1554), Countess of Tenda, Lady of Mauro, Prela, Villanuovo, Mentone and Antibes
- Anna Maria of Piombino, Princess of Piombino, 1699–1700
- Anne Boleyn, Marquess of Pembroke
- Lady Anne Clifford (1590–1676)
- Anne of Alençon (d. 1562), Lady of La Guerche and Pouencé, 1525–62
- Anne, Countess of Auvergne, also known as Anne de la Tour d'Auvergne, Countess of Auvergne, 1501–24
- Anne of Auvergne (1358–1417), Lady of Mercœur and Countess of Forez, 1372–1417, Dauphine of Auvergne, 1399–1417
- Anne of Brittany, Countess of Étampes and Montfort-l'Aumary and Duchess of Brittany, 1488–1514
- Anne of Burgundy (d. 1301), Dauphine of Vienne, Countess of Vienne
- Anne of Chabannes, Countess of Dammartin
- Anne of Clermont, Lady of Baux, ?–1403
- Anne of Croy (1563–1635), Lady of Chimay
- Anne of Gloucester (1383–1438), Countess of Buckingham
- Anne, Queen of Great Britain (6 February 1665 – 1 August 1714)
- Anne of Lorraine, also known as Anne of Vaudemont, Countess of Maulevier, Duchess of Aumale, 1631–38
- Anne of Montmorency (1385–1466), also known as Anne of Laval, Anne of Montmorency-Laval, Lady of Laval, Vitre, Acquigny, Aubigne, Tinteniac, Becherel and Romille, 1414–29
- Anne of Rohan (1604–85), Princess of Guemene
- Anne de Beauchamp, 15th Countess of Warwick (1443–1449), 15th Countess of Warwick, 1445–49
- Anne de Mowbray (1472–81), 8th Countess of Norfolk, 1476–81
- Anne Genevieve of Bourbon-Conde (1619–1679), Duchess of Longueville
- Anne Marie Louise d'Orléans, Duchess of Montpensier (1627–1693), also known as Anne Marie Louise of Bourbon-Montpensier, la Grande Mademoiselle, Countess of Eu, 1627–81, Countess of Mortain, 1660–93, Princess of Dombes & La-Roche-sur-Yon, 1627–81, Princess of Joinville, 1627–89, Duchess of Saint-Fergau, 1627–81, Duchess of Montpensier, 1627–93
- Anne Scott, 1st Duchess of Buccleuch Baroness of Whitchester and Ashdale, Countess of Dalkeith, and Duchess of Buccleuch, 1663–1732
- Antoinette of Bauffremont, Countess of Charny
- Antoinette of Bourbon (1493–1583), Duchess of Guise
- Antonia Enriquez de Ribera y Portocarrero (d. 1623), Duchess of Huescar
- Arsinde, Viscountess of Rocaberti and Perelada
- Arsinoe II (316 BC – 270/260 BC) Ptolemaic Pharaoh of Egypt, co-ruler with her husband
- Artemisia I of Caria (around 480 BC) Queen of Halicarnassus
- Artemisia II of Caria (d. 350 BC) Queen of Caria
- Athaliah (c. 841–835 BC) Queen regnant of Judea
- Attala of Macon, Viscountess of Macon
- Aurembiaix of Urgel (d. 1231), Countess of Urgell
- Ava of Barcelona, Countess of Cerdanya and Besalu, 927–940
- Avantibai Lodhi, warrior-queen (d. March 20, 1858), the ruler of the Indian state of Ramgarh
- Aveline of Nemours (d. 1191/1196), Lady of Nemours
- Azaline of Fezensac, also known as Adalmure of Fezensac, Countess of Fezensac

== B ==
- Barbara of Daun (d. 1547), Lady of Rixingen
- Barthe, Viscountess of Marsan
- Béatrice of Albon (1161–1228), Dauphine of Viennois, Countess of Albon, Grenoble, Oisans and Briancon, 1162–1228
- Beatrice I of Bigorre, Countess of Bigorre, 1055–95
- Beatrice II of Bigorre, Viscountess of Fezensac and Countess of Bigorre, 1112–14
- Beatrice III of Bigorre (1104–1156), Countess of Bigorre, 1128–?
- Beatrice IV of Bigorre, Viscountess of Marsan 1185–?
- Beatrice of Bourbon (1320–83), Lady of Creil
- Beatrice I, Countess of Burgundy, Countess Palatine of Burgundy
- Beatrice II, Countess of Burgundy, Countess Palatine of Burgundy, 1205–31
- Beatrice of Clermont (d. c. 1364), Countess of Charolais, 1316–64
- Beatrice of Montfort (d. 1311), Lady of Rochefort, Countess of Montfort-l'Aumary
- Beatrice of Portugal (1373–c. 1420), titular Queen of Portugal, Consort Queen of Castile and León
- Beatrice of Provence (1234–1267), Lady of Forcalquier & Countess of Provence, 1245–67
- Beatrice of Sabran (1182–1248), Countess of Gap and Embrun, Lady of Caylar
- Beatrice of Savoy, also known as la Grande Dauphine, Lady of Faucigny, 1268–? which she inherited from her mother, Agnes of Faucigny
- Beatrice of Savoy, Countess of Forcalquier and Gap, 1245–56
- Beatrice of Thiers, also known as Beatrice of Thiern, (1174–1228) Countess of Chalon-sur-Saône, 1202–27
- Beatrice Ferillo, Heiress of Muro Lucano
- Beatriu de Montcada Heiress of Moncada
- Beatrix of Burgundy, Countess of Vienne, 1224
- Beatrix, Lady
- Beatrix of Burgundy (b. 1216–?), Lady of Montreal
- Beatrix of Burgundy (1257–1310), Lady of Bourbon, Lady of Saint-Just, Countess of Charolais
- Beatrix of Évreux (1392–1407), Duchess of Nemours
- Beatrix of Maine, Countess of Maine
- Beatrix of Montfort (1245–1312), Countess of Montfort-L’Aumary, 1249–12
- Beatrix of Putten (d. 1354), Lady of Putten and Strijen
- Beatrix of the Netherlands, Queen of the Netherlands, 1980–2013
- Benedetta of Cagliari, Judge of Cagliari, 1214–33
- Berenguela of Castile, Queen of Castile, 1217, Queen of León, 1217
- Berenice II of Egypt (267/266 BC – 221 BC) Queen of Cyrenaica, co-regent of Egypt
- Berenice III of Egypt (120 BC – 80 BC) co-regent, then sole queen of Egypt
- Berenice IV of Egypt (77 BC – 55 BC) Queen of Egypt
- Berta of Aumale, Countess of Aumale, 1048–52
- Bertha of Limburg, Heiress of Monschau, Montjoie
- Bertha of Rouergue, Countess of Rouergue, 953/954–1064
- Berthe of Cornouaille (1119–1157), Duchess of Brittany, 1148–57
- Berthe of Tuscany, Countess of Arles, 936–?
- Biru (1566–1624), Raja of Patani
- Blanche I of Navarre (1386–1441), Queen of Navarre
- Blanche II of Navarre (1424–1464), Queen of Navarre
- Blanca of Molina, Lady of Molina, 1248–93?
- Blanche of Aumale, Countess of Aumale, 1343–87
- Blanche of Dammartin, Lady of Nesle, Countess of Dammartin
- Blanche de Dreux (1270–1327), Lady of Brie-Comte-Robert
- Blanche of Lancaster (1345–1369), Duchess of Lancaster
- Blanche of Ponthieu (d. 1387), Lady of Montgomery, Countess of Aumale, 1343–87
- Bonne de la Roche, Joint Lady of Thebes, 1240
- Boudica, Queen of the Iceni
- Brianda de Beaumont (d. 1588), Countess of Lerin

== C ==
- Caeria (4th century BC) Illyrian queen
- Camadevi (623 or 633–715 or 731) Queen of Hariphunchai
- Catalina of Castile, Viscountess of Limoges, 1317–28
- Caterina Cornaro, Queen of Cyprus, 1473–1489
- Catherine de' Medici, Lady of La Tour and Countess of Auvergne and Boulogne, 1524–89
- Catherine of Alençon, Countess of Mortain, 1412–1216
- Catherine of Appiano (1398–1451), also known as Caterina Appiani, Lady of Piombino, Scarlino, Populonia, Suvereto, Buriano, Abbadia al Fango and of the Isles of Elba, Montecristo and Pianosa, 1445–51
- Catherine of Bourbon-Conde (1575–1595), Marquise des Isles
- Catherine of Clermont (d. 1218), Countess of Clermont-en-Beauvaisis
- Catherine of Cleves (1548–1633), Countess of Eu, 1564–1633
- Catherine of Condé (1258–1329), Lady of Carency
- Catherine of Gemen (d. 1502), Heiress of Wevelinghoven
- Catherine of Gondi, Duchess of Retz, Duchess of Beaupreau
- Catherine of Guise, Duchess of Étampes, 1579–82
- Catherine of L'Isle-Bouchard (c. 1390–1474), Lady of Rochefort-sur-Loire
- Catherine of Navarre (1468–1517), Countess of Bigorre, Foix and Ribagorza, 1483–1517, Duchess of Gandia and Penafiel, and Queen of Navarre
- Catherine of Navarre (1558–1604), Duchess of Albret, Countess of Armagnac
- Catherine of Sully, Countess of Rochefort
- Catherine of Vendôme (1345–1412), Heiress of Vendôme
- Cecile of Rodez (d. 1314), Countess of Rodez
- Cecilia Sagredo, Lady of Paros, 1535–37
- Chand Bibi (1550–1599) ruler of Ahmednagar Sultanate, India
- Charlotte de Montmorency
- Charlotte of Albret (1480–1514), Lady of Chalus
- Charlotte of Armagnac (d. 1504), Countess of Guise & Duchess of Nemours, 1503–04
- Charlotte, Grand Duchess of Luxembourg (1896–1985), reigning Grand Duchess of Luxembourg from 1919 to 1964
- Charlotte of Nevers, Countess of Rethel, 1491–1500
- Chiraprapha (1499–1594) Queen of Lanna
- Christina, Queen of Sweden, Daughter of Gustavus Adolphus of Sweden
- Claire of Athens, Duchess of Athens, 1451
- Claude of France, Lady of Houdan and Neaufles, 1514–24, Countess of Aast, Blois, Coucy, Étampes and Montfort-L’Aumary, and Duchess of Brittany, 1514–24
- Claudine of Monaco (1451–1515), Lady of Monaco, 1457–58 (Abd).
- Clemence of Chateaudun (1229–1259), Viscountess of Chateaudun and Lady of Montdoubleau
- Cleopatra I Syra (204 BC – 176 BC) regent of Egypt
- Cleopatra II of Egypt (c. 185 BC – 116/115 BC) co-ruler of Egypt
- Cleopatra III of Egypt (c. 160 BC – 101 BC) co-ruler of Egypt
- Cleopatra IV of Egypt (c. 138/135 BC – 112 BC) co-ruler of Egypt
- Cleopatra V of Egypt (d. 69/68/57 BC) co-ruler of Egypt
- Cleopatra VII (51–47 BC) co-ruler then sole queen of Egypt
- Cleopatra of Macedon (355/354 – 308 BC) Queen regnant of Epirus
- Cleopatra Selene of Syria (135/140 – 69 BC) Queen regnant of Syria
- Constance of Antioch, Princess of Antioch, Lady of Laodicea and Gibel
- Constance of Béarn (d. 1310), Countess of Bigorre, Viscountess of Marsan, 1301–10
- Constance, Duchess of Brittany Countess of Richmond and Duchess of Brittany, 1166–96
- Constance I of Sicily, Queen of Sicily, 1194–98
- Constance II of Sicily, Queen of Sicily, 1266–1302
- Constanza de Antillón, Señora de Antillón and Heiress of Urgell
- Constanza de Montcada, Heiress of Moncada

== D ==
- Diana de Borbon y Gagnon, Countess de Castile de Vigo
- Diane of Luxemburg-Saint-Pol (d. 1624), Duchess of Piney
- Dias of Muret, Lady of Sarraman and Saves
- Dorotea Orsini (d. 1665), Heiress of Solofra and Muro Lucano
- Douce, Countess of Pallars-Jussa
- Douce I of Gévaudan (1090–1129), also known as Douce of Rouergue, also known as Douce of Arles, Viscountess of Millau and Gévaudan, 1111–29 and Countess of Provence, 1115–30
- Douce II of Provence, Countess of Provence, 1166–67
- Rani Durgavati (1524–1564), ruler of Gond Kingdom, Central India
- Dynamis (67 BC – 8 AD) Roman client queen of the Bosporan Kingdom

== E ==
- Ekaterine Dadiani, Princess Regent of Mingrelia, 1853–66
- Ela of Salisbury, 3rd Countess of Salisbury (c. 1187–1261), Countess of Salisbury, 1196
- Eleanor of Alburquerque (1374–1435), Lady of Alburquerque
- Eleanor of Aquitaine, Duchess of Aquitaine and Gascony, Countess of Poitiers 1137–1204
- Eleanor of Bourbon-La Marche (1407–1463), Countess of La Marche, 1435–62, Duchess of Nemours, 1425–62
- Eleanor of Castile (1241–1290), Countess of Montreuil and Ponthieu, 1279–90
- Eleanor of Navarre, Queen of Navarre
- Elena of Gallura, Judge of Gallura, 1203–17
- Eleonora of Arborea, Judge of Arborea, 1387–1408
- Eleonora of Roddi, Countess of Roddi, 1588–1620
- Eleonore of Roye (d. 1564), Lady of Conti
- Elisa Bonaparte, Princess of Lucca and Piombino, 1805–08; Duchess of Massa, 1805–14; Grand Duchess of Tuscany, 1809–14
- Elisabeth of Freiburg, Countess of Freiburg
- Elisabeth of Leiningen, Lady of Rixingen
- Elisabeth of Mansfeld, Countess of Mansfeld
- Elisabeth of Orlamunde (d. after 1363), Countess of Orlamunde
- Elisabeth of Saint-Pol (1179–1232), Countess of Saint-Pol, 1205–32
- Elisabeth of Sponheim, Countess of Sponheim-Kreutznach, 1414–17, Countess of Vianden, 1400–17
- Elizabeth Clifford (1613–1690/91), 2nd Baroness Clifford, 1643–91
- Elizabeth de Burgh, 4th Countess of Ulster, also known as Elizabeth of Ulster, 12th Lady of Clare, 1360–1363; 4th Countess of Ulster, 1333–63
- Elizabeth de Clare (1295–1360), also known as Elizabeth de Burgh, 11th Lady of Clare, 1314–60
- Elizabeth I (1533–1603)
- Elizabeth II (1926–2022)
- Elizabeth of Gorlitz (1390–1451), also known as Elizabeth of Luxemburg, Duchess of Gorlitz, Duchess of Luxemburg, 1411–41
- Elizabeth of Lippe-Alviderssen, Countess of Schaumburg, ?–1646
- Elvira Ramírez of León (c. 932–after 982), Lady of Toro
- Elvira de Lara, Lady of Subirats, 1209–20, Countess of Urgell, 1209–20
- Emma, Lady of Chateau-Gonthier
- Emma, Lady of Laval (1200-1264), heiress of Laval
- Emma of Provence, Marquise of Provence, 1054–62
- Eremburge de la Fleche (1091–1126), also known as Eremburge of Blois, Lady of Fleche & Countess of Maine & Mans, 1110–26, Lady of Chateau-du-Loir
- Ermengarde of Creyssel, Viscountess of Creyssel
- Ermengarde of Roussillon & Ampurias, Countess of Peyrepertuse
- Ermentrude of Roucy, Count of Macon, Countess of Besançon
- Ermesinde of Carcassonne, Regent Countess of Barcelona, 1018–23
- Ermesinde I of Luxemburg (1080–1143), Lady of Longwy & Countess of Luxemburg, 1136–43
- Ermesinde II of Luxemburg (1186–1247), also known as Ermesinde of Namur, Countess of Durbuy, Laroche & Luxemburg, 1196–1247
- Ermengarde of Narbonne-Pelet (d. 1176), also known as Ermessende Pelet d'Alais, Countess of Melgueil
- Ernestina of Sayn, Countess Sayn-Hachenburg, 1648–61
- Eschiva, Lady of Scandaleon, c. 1370
- Eschiva of Ibelin (1253–1312), Lady of Beirut
- Esclaramunda de Pinés, Heiress of Canet
- Etazeta of Bithynia (fl. 255 BC – 254 BC) regent of Bithynia
- Etiennette of Vienne, Countess of Vienne, also known as Stephanie.
- Euphrosyne of Vendôme, heiress of Vendôme

== F ==
- Falquiline of Bigorre, Countess of Bigorre
- Felicitas of Beichlingen, Countess of Beichlingen
- Fiorenza Crispo (d. before 1483), Lady of Santorini, 1479–80
- Fiorenza Sanudo, Duchess of Naxos, 1361–71
- Francesca Acciaioli, Duchess of Athens, 1394–95
- Françoise of Alençon (d. 1550), Lady of Beaumount-au-Maine, 1525–50
- Françoise of Amboise, Lady of Amboise, 1469–85
- Françoise of Châtillon, Viscountess of Limoges, 1456–81
- Françoise of Dinan (1436–1499), Lady of Chateaubriantis
- Françoise de Lorraine (1592–1669), Countess of Penthièvre, 1602–08, Duchess of Penthièvre, 1608–69, Duchess of Mercœur, 1602–49 (Resigned), Princess of Martigues
- Françoise of Penthièvre (1440–1481), Lady of Avesnes & Viscountess of Limoges & Lomagne, 1455–81, Countess of Périgord
- Françoise of Périgord (d. 1481), Countess of Périgord
- Françoise of Rohan (d. 1591), Duchess of Loudon.
- Fritigil (mid 4th century), Queen of the Marcomanni, last known ruler of the Germanic peoples

== G ==
- Gabrielle d'Estrées (1571–1599), Marquise of Monceaux & Duchess of Beaufort & Duchess of Étampes, 1598–99
- Gaboimilla (c. 1500s), mythical queen of a tribe of Amazons in Southern Chile
- Gentile Brancaleoni (d. 1459), Countess of Mercatello sul Metauro, Lady of Massa Trabaria
- Gerberge of Provence (1060–1115), Countess of Provence and Arles, 1093–1115
- Gersende of Bigorre (d. 1032/34), Countess of Bigorre
- Gersende II of Sabran (1180–1242), Countess of Forcalquier
- Gertrud of Nordheim (1115–1154/65), Countess of Bentheim
- Giordana of Sanseverino, Lady of Solofra
- Giovanna Carafa, Countess of Roddi, 1525–34
- Gisela Agnes of Rath (1669–1740), Countess of Nienburg, 1694–1740
- Guglielma Pallavicini (d. 1358), Lady of Thermopylae, Marchioness of Bodonitsa, 1311
- Guillemette of Neufchâtel (1270–1317), also known as Guillemette of Neuenburg, Lady of Montbéliard
- Guillermina, Countess of Pallars-Soubira
- Guinidilda of Roussillon, heiress of Miron I, Count of Roussillon
- Guinodeon, Countess of Porhoet
- Guirande of Dax, Viscountess of Dax
- Guiscarda of Béarn, Viscountess of Béarn, 1134–54
- Guyonne of Salins, Lady of Salins

== H ==
- Hatshepsut, Pharaoh of Egypt
- Hawise of Blois, Countess of Aumale, 1179–94
- Hedwig of Bentheim (d. c. 1371), Heiress of Bentheim
- Hedwig of Ravensberg, Heiress of Lordship of Dale, 1166
- Heilwig of Kyburg (d. 1260), Countess of Kyburg
- Helen of Serbia, Ruler of Zeta, 1276–1309
- Helissende of Perche, Countess of Perche
- Helvis, Lady of Catheu
- Helvise of Ramleh, Lady of Ramleh
- Henrietta Churchill, Duchess of Marlborough, 1722–33
- Henriette of Cleves (1552–1601), Countess of Rethel & Duchess of Nevers, 1564–1601
- Henriette of Grandson (d. 1322), Lady of Grandson and la Sarraz
- Henriette, Countess of Montbéliard, also known as Henriette of Montfaucon (1387–1444), Countess of Montbeliard, 1397–1444
- Henriette Catherine of Joyeuse (1585–1654), Lady of Roches, Countess of Bouchage, Duchess of Joyeuse, 1608–47; Princess of Joinville, 1641–54
- Hildiarde of Oisy, Viscountess of Meux
- Hortense Mancini, Duchess of Mayenne, Mazarin & Rethel, 1661–69
- Humberge of Limoges, also known as Brunisende of Limoges, Viscountess of Limoges, 1194–1253

== I ==
- Ida of Boulogne, Countess of Mortain, 1204–16
- Ide-Raymonde of Forez, Countess of Forez
- Ii Naotora, 18th head of the Ii clan (d. 1582)
- Ilaria Scillato, Lady of Ceppaloni
- Ippolita I Ludovisi (1663–1724), Princess of Piombino, 1700–24
- Irene the Athenian, Byzantine Empress, 797–802
- Irene Palaeologina, Empress of Trebizond, 1340–41
- Irmgard of Plotzkau (1070/80–1153), Heiress of County of Walbeck
- Irmgard of Wevelinghoven (d. 1474), Heiress of Lordship of Alfter
- Isabeau of Antoing (d. 1354), Burgravine of Ghent
- Isabeau of Carlat (d.1325), Viscountess of Carlat
- Isabeau of Roquefeuil (d.1271), Lady of Carlat
- Isabeau of Craon, Lady of Craon
- Isabeau of Germaines (d. 1341), Lady of Germaines
- Isabeau of Ghistelle, Countess of Harnes, 1386–1413
- Isabeau of Thouars, Lady of Mauleon & Talmond, Viscountess of Thouars, Countess of Benon & Dreux
- Isabeau of Vivonne, Lady of Regnac
- Isabel of Brazil (1846–1921), heiress presumptive of the Empire of Brazil and regent on three occasions.
- Isabel, widow of Ravano dalle Carceri, Lord of Euboea, 1209–16; Princess of Euboea, 1216–20
- Isabel of Aragon (1409–1443), Countess of Urgell, 1433–43
- Isabel de Mauduit, heiress of County of Warwick
- Isabel Douglas, Countess of Mar, Countess of Mar and Lady of Garioch, 1391–1404
- Isabel Teles de Molina (1290–?), 10th Lady of Menezes
- Isabel de Warenne, heiress of Warenne
- Isabella I of Castile, Queen of Castile, 1474–1504
- Isabella of England (1332–1379), Countess of Soissons, 1365
- Isabella, Duchess of Lorraine
- Isabella II of Spain, Queen of Spain, 1833–68
- Isabella of Gloucester (1170–1217), Countess of Gloucester
- Isabella of Ibelin, Lady of Beirut, 1264–82
- Isabella of Jerusalem, Queen of Jerusalem, 1190–1206
- Isabella of Oultrejourdain, Lady of Oultrejourdain
- Isabella Appiani, also known as Isabella d'Appiani d'Aragon, Lady of Piombino & Elba, 1590–94; Princess of Piombino, 1594–1661
- Isabella Pallavicini, Marchioness of Bodonitsa, 1278–86
- Isabella of Roucy, Countess of Roucy, ?–1379
- Isabella of Spain (1566–1633), Countess of Charolais, 1598–1633, Countess Palatine of Burgundy, 1598–1633
- Isabella of Clermont, Princess of Taranto, 1463–65
- Isabella de Warenne (1137–1199), Countess of Surrey
- Isabella da Ponte, Heiress of Tagliacozzo
- Isabelle of Albret (d. 1294), Lady of Albret & Viscountess of Maremne, 1283–94
- Isabelle, Lady of Argos and Nauplia
- Isabelle of Angoulême (1187–1246), Countess of Angoulême, 1202–46
- Isabelle of Beaujeau (d. 1297), Lady of Beaujeau, 1250–97
- Isabelle of Beauvau (1436–1474), Lady of La-Roche-sur-Yon, Lady of Champigny-sur-Vende
- Isabelle of Brienne (1305–1360), Countess of Conversano, 1356–60, Countess of Lecce, 1356–60, Countess of Brienne, 1356–60.
- Isabelle of Chartres (d. 1248/1249), Lady of Amboise (before 1218) and Countess of Chartres (after 1218)
- Isabelle of Coucy (d. 1411), Countess of Soissons, ?–1411
- Isabelle of Dreux (1160–1239), Lady of Baudemont
- Isabelle of Foix (1360–1426), Viscountess of Béarn & Castelbon & Countess of Foix, 1398–1412
- Isabelle of France (1158–1197), Countess of Vexin
- Isabella, Countess of Vertus (1348–1373), Countess of Vertus 1361–73
- Isabelle of Luxembourg (d. 1472), Countess of Guise
- Isabelle of Mayenne (d. 1257), Lady of Mayenne, 1220–57
- Isabelle of Rumigny (1263–1322), Lady of Rumigny, 1270–1322
- Isabelle I of Villehardouin (1260–1311), Princess of Achaea, 1289–97, 1301–07

== J ==
- Jacqueline, Countess of Hainaut, Lady of Friesland & Countess of Hainaut, Holland & Zeeland, 1417–32
- Jacqueline of Bethune (d. 1457), Countess of Harnes, 1413–42
- Jacqueline de Longwy (d. 1561), Countess of Bar-sur-Seine
- Jadwiga the Saint, Queen of Poland, 1384–99
- Lady Jane Grey (1536/1537 – 12 February 1554), also known as Lady Jane Dudley or The Nine Days' Queen, de facto monarch of England from 10 July until 19 July 1553.
- Jeanne de Scepeaux, Countess of Chemilles, Duchess of Beaupreau
- Jeanne de la Guerche, Lady of La Guerche, Pouance & Chateau-Gnthier
- Jeanne of Albret, Countess of Dreux (d. 1444)
- Jeanne of Argies (d. 1334), Lady of Catheu
- Jeanne of Avaugour (d. 1327), Countess of Goello and Avaugour
- Jeanne, Dauphine d'Auvergne (1414–1436), Countess of Clermont-en-Beauvaisis, Countess of Sancerre, 1419–36, Dauphine of Auvergne
- Jeanne I of Auvergne, Duchess of Auvergne
- Jeanne of Avesnes (1323–1350), Lady of Chimay & Countess of Soissons, 1350
- Jeanne of Bar (1415–1462), Countess of Soissons & Marle
- Jeanne of Beaujeau (d. 1308), Lady of Montpensier, 1285–1308
- Jeanne I of Beaujeau (1345–1346), also known as Jeanne of Dreux, Lady of Montpensier, 1345–46
- Jeanne of Bethune (d. 1450). Viscountess of Meaux, 1408–50
- Jeanne of Bourbon (d. 1487), Lady of Rochefort
- Jeanne of Brabant, Duchess of Brabant, 1355–1406, Duchess of Limburg, 1355–96
- Jeanne of Brienne, Lady of Seans-en-Othe
- Jeanne of Brienne (d. 1389), Lady of Chateau-Chinon, 1351–89, which she inherited from her mother Jeanne of Mello
- Jeanne I of Burgundy, Countess Palatine of Burgundy, 1200–05
- Jeanne II, Countess of Burgundy (1292–1330), Countess Palatine of Burgundy, 1307–30, Lady of Salins, 1303–23, Countess of Artois, 1329–30
- Jeanne of Châtellerault (1235–1315), Viscountess of Châtellerault
- Jelena Gruba, (1345–1399), Queen of Bosnia (1391 to 1398), first as queen consort until 1395 and then as queen regnant, she was the only female head of state in the history of Bosnia and Herzegovina.
- Joanna of Châtillon, Duchess of Athens, 1311
- Jeanne of Chiny (1210–56), Countess of Chiny
- Jeanne of Clermont (d. 1436), Countess of Clermont, Dauphine of Auvergne
- Jeanne of Dammartin (1216–1279), Countess of Aumale, 1239–79, Countess of Montreuil & Ponthieu, 1251–79
- Jeanne of Dreux, Countess of Braine
- Jeanne I of Dreux (1345–1346), Countess of Dreux, Countess of Joigny
- Jeanne II of Dreux (1309–1355), Countess of Dreux, Countess of Joigny
- Jeanne of Flanders, Countess of Flanders & Hainaut, 1205–44
- Jeanne of Forez (d. 1369), Countess of Forez
- Jeanne III, Countess of Burgundy, Countess Palatine of Burgundy & Countess of Artois, 1330–47
- Jeanne of Ham, Lady of Ham
- Jeanne of Harcourt, Lady of Aigle
- Jeanne of Harcourt (1372–1456), Lady of Montaigle
- Jeanne of Harcourt (d. 1488), Countess of Tancarville, 1484–88
- Jeanne of Joigny (d. 1454), Lady of Grignon, Countess of Joigny
- Jeanne of Joinville, Countess of Joigny
- Jeanne of Luxembourg (d. 1407), Countess of Ligny, Duchess of Saint-Fergau, Lady of Roussy
- Jeanne of Luxembourg (d. 1430), also known as Demoiselle de Luxemburg, Countess of Ligny & Saint-Pol, 1430, Lady of Roussy
- Jeanne of Mello (d. 1351), Lady of Chateau-Chinon
- Jeanne of Montfaucon (d. 1445), Lady of Montfaucon
- Jeanne of Montpensier (d. 1308), Countess of Montpensier
- Jeanne III of Navarre (1528–1572), Viscountess of Béarn, Limoges, Lomagne, Maremne & Tartas, 1555–72, Countess of Armagnac, Dreux, Fezensac, Foix, Gause, Guisnes, l'Isle-Jourdain, Pardiac, Perche, Périgord, Porhoet & Rodez, 1555–72, Duchess of Albret, 1555–72
- Jeanne of Penthièvre (1319–1384), also known as Joan the Lame or Joan, Duchess of Brittany, Viscountess of Limoges & Countess of Avaugour & Penthièvre, 1331–84
- Joanna of Pfirt (1300–1351), Countess of Pfirt
- Jeanne of Pierrepont (1406–1459), Lady of Braine, Lady of Roucy
- Jeanne of Ponthieu (d. 1376), Lady of Épernon
- Jeanne of Rethel (1277–1328), Countess of Rethel, 1285–1328
- Jeanne of Soissons (1323–1350), Countess of Soissons
- Jeanne of Tancarville, Heiress of Tancarville
- Jeanne of Toulouse (1220–71), Countess of Toulouse, 1249–71
- Jeanne of Vaudemont (1458–1480), Countess of Aumale, Countess of Guise, Countess of Mortain
- Jimena Diaz, Lady of Valencia, 1099–1102
- Jindeok of Silla (647–654), Queen of Korea
- Jinseong of Silla (887–897), Queen of Korea
- Joan, Countess of Blois (1258–1292), also known as Jeanne of Châtillon, Lady of Avesnes & Countess of Blois, Chartres & Dunois, 1280–91
- Joan, Duchess of Brittany (1319–1384), Duchess of Brittany, 1341–84
- Joan I of Navarre, Countess of Champagne, 1274–1305
- Joan I of Naples (1326–1381), Lady of Forcalquier, 1373–81, Countess of Provence, 1373–81, Princess of Achaea, 1373–81, Duchess of Calabria, 1373–81, Queen of Naples
- Joan II of Naples, Queen of Naples
- Joan II of Navarre, Queen of Navarre, 1328–49, Countess of Mortain, 1328–49
- Joan of Kent (1328–1385), also known as the Fair Maid of Kent, Lady Joan Plantagenet, 5th Baroness Wake of Liddell & Countess of Kent, 1352–85
- Joanna of Durazzo, Duchess of Durazzo 1348–68
- Johanna of Baden-Hochberg, Margravine of Rothelin, 1503–43, Countess of Neuchâtel, 1503–43
- Johanna of Forbach, Lady of Rixingen
- Joice Lado, Lady of South Sudan
- Jordane de La Sarraz, Lady of Belmont
- Juana the Mad, Queen of Castile, 1504–55
- Juliana of the Netherlands, Queen of the Netherlands, 1948–80
- Juliane de Leyburn, Baroness Leyburn
- Juana of Portugal, Countess of Mortain, 1250–51
- Juana de Panyafiel (1339–1381), Lady of Lara, Lady of Vizcaya
- Juana Nunez de Lara (1285–1351), Lady of Herrera, Lady of Lara
- Juliana Grenier, Lady of Caesarea, 1187–1219
- Jusiana de Entenza, Lady of Alcolea
- Jutta of Ravensberg (d. after 1302), Heiress of Vechta and Vlotho

== K ==
- Kamasarye Philoteknos (180–150 BC) Queen regnant of the Bosporan Kingdom
- Katharina of Saffenberg, countess of Neuenahr
- Khentkaus I, possibly a regent for one of her sons, a Pharaoh of Egypt
- Empress Kōken/Shōtoku (718-770, first reign 749-758, second reign 764-770), empress regnant of Japan. The only Japanese female emperor to be declared crown princess in her own right and rule on account of hereditary succession.
- Kittur Chennamma (1778–1829), Indian freedom fighter and Rani of the Kittur
- Kubaba, only queen on the Sumerian king list
- Kunigunde of Dale (d. 1350), Heiress of Dale-Diepenheim

== L ==
- Lakshmibai, Queen (Rani) of Maratha-ruled Jhansi State, India 1853–58. She was one of the leading figures of the Indian Rebellion of 1857 and became for Indian nationalists a symbol of resistance to the rule of the British East India Company in the subcontinent.
- Laodice (fl. 2nd century BC) Queen of the Kingdom of Pontus, likely a co-ruler with her husband
- Laure of Chabanais (1245–?), Countess of Bigorre, 1255–?
- Laure of Montfort (d. 1270), Lady of Épernon and Gambais
- Lauretta of Saarbrücken, Countess of Saarbrücken, 1252–71
- Leonor de Cabrera (1264–?), Heiress of Urgel
- Leonore of Rohan (1539–1583), Countess of Rochefort
- Liegarde of Chalon, Duchess of Burgundy
- Lili'uokalani (1838–1917), Queen of the Kingdom of Hawaii, 1891–93
- Liutgarde of Falkenstein, Countess of Falkenstein
- Louise of Albret (d. 1531), Viscountess of Limoges
- Louise of Arberg (d. 1519), Countess of Valangin, 1518–19
- Louise of Aumont (1759–1826), Duchess of la Meilleraye, Mayenne & Rethel, 1781–89
- Louise de Bourbon, Duchess of Montpensier (1483–1561), also known as Louise de Bourbon, Countess of Mortain, 1530–61, Countess of Montpensier, 1538–39, Duchess of Montpensier, 1522–61, Dauphine of Auvergne, 1538–61, Duchess of Auvergne, 1538–61
- Louise of Clermont, Lady of Baux, 1403–21
- Louise of Luxemburg-Saint-Pol (1567–1647), Countess of Brienne, 1608–47
- Louise of Savoy (1476–1531), Countess of Beaumont-en-Anjou, 1515–16, Countess of Maine, 1515–31, Countess of Beaufort, Countess of Gien, Duchess of Beaufort, 1515–18, Duchess of Angoulême, 1515–31; Duchess of Anjou, 1515–31, Duchess of Nemours, 1524–31, Duchess of Bourbon, 1527–31
- Louise de Beon, Countess of Brienne, Countess of Brienne, 1647–?.
- Louise Élisabeth de Bourbon, Duchess of Étampes, 1718–52
- Louise Jean de Durfort (1735–1781), Duchess of la Meilleraye, Mayenne, Mazarin & Rethel, 1738–81
- Louise Henriette de Bourbon, Duchess of Étampes, 1752–59
- Louise Hippolyte of Monaco (1697–1731), Princess of Monaco, 1731
- Louise Marie Adélaïde de Bourbon, also known as Louise Marie Adélaïde of Bourbon-Penthièvre, Duchess of Aumale, 1814–21, Countess of Eu, 1793–1821
- Louise-Renée de Pénancoët de Kéroualle, Baroness of Petersfield, Countess of Fareham, 1st Duchess of Portsmouth & 1st Duchess of Aubigny
- Lucia of Tripoli, Countess of Tripoli, 1287–89
- Lucrezia Pignatelli (1704–1760), 4th Princess of Strongoli, 6th Countess of Melissa, Duchess of Tolve
- Luisa Manrique of Lara, Duchess of Najera, 1558–85
- Lukarde of Leiningen, Heiress of Leiningen
- Lý Chiêu Hoàng (1218–1278), Queen regnant of Vietnam, the only female emperor in Vietnamese history
- Lyonette of Geneva, Lady of Gex

== M ==
- Mabille of Bellem (d. 1082), Lady of Belleme, 1070–82; Countess of Alençon
- Madeleine Charlotte of Piney-Luxembourg, Countess of Ligny & Duchess of Piney-Luxemburg, 1680–1701
- Mafalda Manrique of Lara, also known as Mafalda Gonzalez, Lady of Molina, 1239–48
- Magdalena of Neuenahr, Heiress of Limburg
- Magdalena Christina of Sayn, Countess Sayn-Hachenburg, 1661–1715
- Mahaut of Artois (1268–1329), Countess of Artois, 1302–29
- Mahaut I of Courtenay (1185–1257), Countess of Nevers, 1192–1257
- Mahaut of Courtenay (c. 1254–1303), Countess of Chieti
- Mahaut II of Dampierre (1234–1262), Lady of Broigny, Donzy, Montjoy, Perche-Goet, Saint Aignan & Torigny, 1254–62, Lady of Bourbon, 1257–62, Countess of Auxerre, Nevers & Tonnerre, 1257–62
- Mahaut of Dammartin, Countess of Aumale, 1216–59
- Mahaut of Grignon (d. 1192), Countess of Grignon and Tonnerre
- Mania (c. 440–399 BC) ruler of Dardanus
- Margaret de Newburg, Countess of Warwick (d. 1253)
- Margaret of Salisbury (1473–1541), 8th Countess of Salisbury, also known as Margaret Plantagenet, Blessed Margaret Pole
- Margaret, Countess of Blois (d. 1230)
- Maria, ruler of the Tehuelche
- Mari, Sovereign Countess of Aramayona
- Margaret, Countess of Carrick (d. 1292), also known as Marjorie of Carrick
- Margaret Maultasch, Countess of Tyrol
- Margaret of Austria, Duchess of Savoy (1480–1530), Countess of Charolais, 1493–1530, Countess Palatine of Burgundy, 1493–1530, Countess of Artois, 1493–1530
- Margaret of Béarn (1245–1319), Countess of Bigorre
- Margaret of Dampierre, Countess of Rethel, 1384–1402
- Margaret of Enghien (1365–1397), Countess of Conversano
- Margaret I, Countess of Burgundy, Lady of Salins, 1361–82, Countess Palatine of Burgundy, 1361–82, Countess of Artois, 1361–82
- Margaret I of Flanders, Countess of Flanders & Hainaut, 1244–80
- Margaret of Freiburg (d. 1300/39), Heiress of Badenweiler
- Margaret I of Holland (1311–1356),
- Margaret II of Flanders, Countess of Hainaut, Holland & Zeeland, 1345–49
- Margaret III, Countess of Flanders
- Margaret of Limburg (d. 1479), Heiress of Bedburg & Hakenbroich
- Margaret of Lorraine-Adamant (d. 1477), Lady of Arschot
- Margaret, Countess of Mar, Countess of Mar, 1374–91
- Margaret of Norfolk (1320–1399), Duchess of Norfolk, 1397–99, 2nd Countess of Norfolk, 1338–99
- Margaret of Reyghersvliet, Countess of Harnes, ?–1340
- Margaret of Salisbury, also known as Margaret Longespee, Countess of Salisbury
- Margaret of Zeeland, Countess of Zeeland, 1345–54
- Margaret Wake, 3rd Baroness Wake (1300–1349), Baroness Wake of Liddell, 1349
- Margareta of Gleichen (1480–1567), Countess of Gleichen in Blankenhain
- Margarethe of Courtenay, Margravine of Namur
- Margarethe of Marck (1527–1599), Countess of Arenberg
- Margarethe of Ravensberg (d. 1389), Heiress of Ravensberg and Berg
- Margery of Warwick (d. 1253), Countess of Warwick
- Margherita di Chiaramonte, sister and heiress of Ugone, Count of Chiaramonte, Lord of Castronovo, Noja, Torremare and Sevisio
- Margherita di Sangineto (d. after 1380), Countess of Altomonte and Corigliano
- Marguerite de Neuilly, Lady of Passava; Heiress of Akova
- Margrethe II of Denmark (b. 1940), Queen of Denmark, 1972–2024
- Marguerite of Alençon (1503–?), Countess of Alençon
- Marguerite of Amboise (d. 1475), Princess of Talmond, Viscountess of Thouars, Lady of Mauleon, Lady of Montrichard
- Marguerite of Angoulême, Duchess of Alençon & Berry, Countess of Rodez, Armagnac, Perche, Fezensac, L’Isle-Jourdain, Porhoet, Pardiac, Viscountess of Lomagne, Fezenzaguet, Brulhois, Cressey, Auvillars, Baroness of Castelnau, Caussade, Montmiral, Lady of La Fleche and Bauge
- Marguerite of Anjou and Maine (1273–1299), Countess of Anjou and Maine, 1290–99
- Marguerite of Armagnac (d. 1504), Duchess of Nemours and Countess of Guise & Pardiac, 1503–04
- Marguerite of Bauge (d. c. 1252), Lady of Miribel
- Marguerite of Béarn (1245–1319), Viscountess of Béarn, 1290–1301
- Marguerite of Beaumont (d. 1307), Countess of Charmerlan
- Marguerite of Berrie, Lady of Berrie
- Marguerite of Bigorre, Countess of Bigorre, 1290–1301
- Marguerite of Blois (1170–1230), Lady of Romorantin & Millancay & Countess of Dunois & Blois, 1218–30
- Marguerite of Blois (d. 1419), Countess of Sancerre, Lady of Charenton
- Marguerite of Brittany (1392–1428), Lady of Guillac
- Margaret of Burgundy, Queen of Sicily (1250–1308), Countess of Tonnerre, 1262–1308
- Marguerite of Comminges (1363–1443), Countess of Comminges, 1375
- Marguerite of Dampierre (d. 1316), Lady of Dampierre and Saint-Dizier
- Marguerite of Enghien (1365–1397), Countess of Brienne, 1394–97
- Marguerite of Geneva (1160–?), Lady of Clermont-en-Beauvaisis.
- Marguerite of Joigny, Countess of Joigny, Lady of Pouilly and Premartin
- Marguerite of Joinville (1354–1418), Lady of Joinville & Countess of Vaudemont, 1365–1415
- Marguerite of Lorraine (1463–1521), Lady of Mayenne, 1499–1509
- Marguerite of Macon (d. 1257/59), Lady of Salins, 1219–25
- Marguerite of Melun (d. 1448), Countess of Tancarville, 1415–48
- Marguerite of Nesle (1300–1350), Lady of Argies & Chimay & Countess of Soissons, 1306–50
- Marguerite of Orléans (1406–1466), Countess of Vertus
- Marguerite de Rohan (1616/17–1684), Duchess of Rohan and Frontenay, Princess of León and Soubise, Countess of Porhoet
- Marguerite of Soissons (d. 1350), Lady of Chimay and Countess of Soissons, 1307–15
- Marguerite Grenier, Lady of Caesarea, 1239–64
- Marguerite of Lusignan, Lady of Tyre, 1284–86
- Marguerite of Montmorency (1175–?), Lady of Verneuil, Poissy, Vernouillet and Meulan
- Marguerite of Valois, Countess of Auvergne, 1608–10, Duchess of Étampes, 1582–98
- Marguerite Charlotte of Piney-Luxembourg, Countess of Ligny & Duchess of Piney-Luxemburg, 1616–80
- Maria de Urgell (d. 1196), Señora de Almenara
- Maria dalle Carceri (d. 1323), Heiress of 1/6 of Euboea as the daughter of Gaetano dalle Carceri; Marquise (1/2) of Bodonitsa, 1311–58, as the widow of Albert Pallavicini. She shared Bodonitsa with their daughter, Guglielma.
- Maria of Antioch-Armenia, Lady of Toron, 1229–66
- Maria of Cleves (1553–?), Duchess of Cleves
- Maria of Hornes (d. 1434), Countess of Hornes, Lady of Duffel and Waelheim
- Mary, Queen of Hungary (1371–1395), Queen of Croatia, 1382–95, Queen of Hungary, 1382–95
- Maria of Jever, Lady of Jever, 1511–75
- Maria of Molina, Lady of Molina, 1293?–1322?
- Maria of Montferrat, Queen of Jerusalem, 1205
- Maria I of Portugal (1734–1816), Queen of Portugal, 1777–1816
- Maria of Randerath (d. 1395), Lady of Randerath
- Maria of Vianden (c. 1337–1400), Countess of Vianden
- Maria Albina of Hauteville (d. after 1205), Countess of Lecce
- Maria Angelina Ducena Palaeologina, Ruler of Epirus, 1385–86
- Maria Beatrice Ricciarda (1750–1829), Sovereign Duchess of Massa, Sovereign Princess of Carrara, 1790–97, 1814–29, 7th Duchess of Ajello, Baroness of Paduli and Lady of Lago, Laghitello, Serra e Terrati, Princess of Modena and Reggio
- Maria del Pilar Garcia Sancho y Zabala, Duchess of Najera, 1864
- Maria Eleonora I Boncompagni (1686–1745), also known as Maria Eleoonora I Boncompagni-Ludovisi, Marchioness of Populonia, Countess of Conza, Princess of Piombino, 1707–45
- Maria Lopez of Haro, Lady of Vizcaya, 1311–25, 1326–33
- Maria Luisa de Aragon y Pernstein (d. 1663), 6th Duchess of Luna, 7th Duchess of Villahermosa.
- Maria Manuela of Portugal (1538–1587), Duchess of Viseu.
- Maria Pacheco (c. 1400–?), Lady of Belmonte
- Maria Teresa Cybo-Malaspina, Duchess of Massa, Sovereign Duchess of Massa, Sovereign Princess of Carrara, 6th Duchess of Ajello, Baroness of Paduli, Sovereign Lady of Moneta and Avenza, Lady of Lago, Laghitello, Serra and Terrati
- Maria Theresa of Austria (1717–1780), Queen of Croatia, 1743–80, Queen of Hungary, 1740–80
- Maria da Varona, Princess of Euboea, 1317–37
- Maria dalle Carceri, Princess of Euboea, 1279–96
- Maria II Zaccaria, Princes of Achaea, 1402–04
- Maria II of Portugal (1819–1853), Queen of Portugal, 1826–28 and 1834–53
- Marie de Béarn (d. 1186), Heiress of Béarn, 1170
- Marie de Sully, Lady of Sully, Lady of Craon, Countess of Guînes, Sovereign Princess of Boisbelle
- Marie of Albret (1491–1549), Lady of Orval & Countess of Rethel, 1500–40
- Marie of Alençon (d. 1549), Countess of Alençon
- Marie Antoinette (1755–1793), Archduchess of Austria, Dauphine of France, 1770–74, Queen of France and Navarre, 1774–92
- Marie of Artois (d. 1365), Lady of Merode
- Marie of Aumale, Countess of Aumale, 1239–51
- Marie of Baux (d. 1417), Princess of Orange, 1393–1417
- Marie of Belleme (1199–1250), Lady of Ponthieu
- Marie of Berry (1367–1434), Countess of Montpensier, 1416–34, Duchess of Auvergne, 1400–34
- Marie of Bois-Belle, Princess of Bois Belle
- Marie of Boulogne, Countess of Mortain, 1167–73
- Marie of Bourbon, also known as Marie of Bourbon-Vendôme, (1539–1601), Countess of Gace, Hambye and Briquebec, Countess of Saint-Pol, 1546–1601, Duchess of Estouteville
- Marie of Bourbon (1315–1387), Princess of Achaea and Morea, 1364–70 (Abd)
- Marie de Bourbon-Conde (1606–1692), Countess of Soissons, 1612–92
- Marie de Bourbon-Montpensier (1605–1627), Countess of Mortain & Duchess of Châtellerault, Montpensier & Saint-Fergau, 1608–1627
- Marie of Brittany, Lady of La Guerche (1391–1446), Lady of La Guerche
- Marie of Châtillon (1343–1404), Lady of Guise and Mayenne, 1360–1404
- Marie of Châtillon, Vidamese of Laon
- Marie of Coucy (1366–1405) Countess of Soissons, 1398–1405
- Marie of Enghien (d. 1318), Lady of Zotteghem, Burgravine of Ghent
- Marie of Enghien, Lady of Argos and Nauplia, 1376–88
- Marie II of Enghien (1367–1446), also known as Mary of Enghien, Lady of Castro & Countess of Lecce & Brienne, 1384–1446
- Marie of Flanders (d. 1350), Viscountess of Chateaudun
- Marie of Ham, Lady of Ham
- Marie, Countess of Harcourt (1398–1476), Lady of Arschot, Brionne, Elbeuf, Forcalquier, L'Islebonne, & La Saussaye & Countess of Aumale, Harcourt & Mortain, 1452–76
- Marie-Adélaïde, Grand Duchess of Luxembourg (1894–1924), was reigning Grand Duchess of Luxembourg from 1912 to 1919
- Marie of Limoges (1260–1291), Viscountess of Limoges, 1263–91
- Marie of Looz (d. 1408), Lady of Château-Thierry, 1372–1408
- Marie of Lorraine (1615–1688), 8th Duchess of Guise, Duchess of Joyeuse & Princess of Joinville, 1675–88
- Marie of Lusignan, Countess d'Eu, Countess of Eu, 1250–60
- Marie of Luxembourg (1472–1547), also known as Marie de Luxemburg, Viscountess of Meaux & Countess of Ligny, Marle & Soissons, 1482–1547, 24th or 25th Countess of Saint-Pol, 1482–1547
- Marie of Luxembourg (1562–1623), Duchess of Étampes & Penthièvre, 1569–1623
- Marie of Montmirail (d. 1272), Heiress of Montmirail, Oisy, Crèvecœur, Conde-en-Brie, the Viscounty of Meaux & Chatelainie of Cambrai, Lady of Conde-Brie
- Marie of Montpellier (d. 1219), Lady of Montpellier, 1205–13
- Marie of Orléans-Longueville (1625–1707), also known as Marie de Longueville, Duchess of Estouteville, Sovereign Princess of Neuchâtel & Countess of Valangin, 1699–1707
- Marie of Ponthieu (1186–1251), Countess of Montreuil & Pontannhieu, 1221–51
- Marie of Rethel, Countess of Rethel, 1243–45
- Marie II Zaccharia, Princess of Achaea, 1402–04
- Marie of Vilademuls, Lady of Vilademuls
- Marie Anne de Bourbon, Duchess of Étampes, 1712–18
- Marie Jeanne Baptiste of Savoy, Duchess of Aumale, 1659–86
- Marie Liesse of Luxemburg-Saint-Pol (1611–1660), Princess of Tingry
- Marie Sophie Colbert (d. 1747), Margravine of Seignelay & Countess of Tancarville
- Margarida de Cabrera (1265-1328), Countess of Ampurias
- Mary I of England, Queen of England, 1553–58
- Mary II of England, Queen of England, 1689–94
- Mary, Queen of Scots, 1542–67
- Mary, Countess of Blois (1200–1241), also known as Marie of Avesnes, Lady of Romorantin and Millancay & Countess of Dunois & Blois, 1230–41 and Lady of Chateaurenault and Countess of Chartres, 1236–41
- Mary of Béarn (1145–1186), Viscountess of Bruilhois & Béarn, 1170–73
- Mary of Burgundy, also known as Mary the Rich, (1457–1482), Countess of Charolais & Zeeland, Countess Palatine of Burgundy, Duchess of Burgundy & Limburg, 1477–82
- Maria of Sicily, Duchess of Athens, 1377–88, Queen of Sicily, 1377–88
- Mary Scott, 3rd Countess of Buccleuch, Countess of Buccleuch, 1651–61
- Mascarose I of Armagnac, Countess of Armagnac & Fezensac, 1245–49
- Mascarose II of Lomagne, Countess of Armagnac, 1249–56, Viscountess of Fezensac, 1249–56
- Mathe I of Albret (d. 1283), Lady of Albret & Viscountess of Maremne, 1281–83
- Mathe of Bigorre (1225–1270), Viscountess of Marsan, 1255–70
- Mathilde of Amboise (d. 1256), Lady of Amboise, 1218–56
- Mathilde of Baden (d. 1259), Lady of Stuttgart
- Mathilde of Bethune (1220–1264), Lady of Bethune, Dendermonde/Termonde, Richebourg and Warneton
- Mathilde II of Boulogne (1202–1262), Countess of Boulogne, 1216–62, Countess of Mortain, 1233–35, Countess of Dammartin
- Mathilde of Burgundy (d. 1005), Countess of Nevers
- Mathilde of Burgundy, Countess of Grignon
- Mathilde of Chalon, Lady of Donzy
- Mathilde of Chateau-du-Loir (d. 1099), heiress of Chateau-du-Loir
- Mathilde of Châtillon, also known as Mahaut of Châtillon, Countess of Saint Pol, 1369–72
- Mathilde of Heinsberg (d. 1189), Heiress of County Palatine of Sommerschenburg
- Mathilde of Landsberg (d. 1255), Regent Margravine of Brandenburg, 1220–25 for her son John I of Brandenburg (1208–1266)
- Mathilde of Rethel, Countess of Rethel, 1124–51
- Mathilde of Saarbrücken, Countess of Saarbrücken, 1271–74
- Matilda of Canossa (1046–1115), Lady of Canossa, Duchess of Tuscany, Countess of Reggio Emilia, Duchess of Spoleto, Margravine of Camerino
- Matilda of Dammartin (1202–1258), Countess of Dammartin, Countess of Boulogne
- Matilda of Hainaut, Princess of Achaea, 1313–18
- Maud of Lancaster (1339–1362), Countess of Leicester
- Mavia (4th century), Arab warrior-queen
- Muniadona of Castile, Countess of Ribagorza
- Mechtild of Brunswick-Lunenburg (1230–1298), Regent Countess of Anhalt-Aschersleben, 1266–70, for her sons Otto I and Heinrich III of Anhalt-Aschersleben.
- Mechtild of Guelders, Duchess of Guelders, 1371–84
- Mechtild of Reifferscheid (d. 1437), Heiress of Lordship of Bedburg
- Melisende of Arsuf, Lady of Arsuf, ?–1236
- Melisende of Chateaudun, Viscountess of Chateaudun
- Melisende of Jerusalem, Queen of Jerusalem, 1131–53
- Melissende of Maine (d. 890), heiress of Mayenne
- Mencia de Mendoza y Enriquez de Cabrera (d. 1619), Duchess of Huescar
- Merneith (around 2950 BC) regent and possibly a ruler of Egypt in her own right
- Meullent I of Castile, Countess of Aumale, 1279–1324
- Miroslawa of Pomerelia (d. 1233), Regent Duchess of Pomerania-Wolgast, 1220–33, for her son Barnim I of Pomerania-Wolgast (1219–1264)
- Munia Mayor of Castile (Munia Elvira)) (990–1066), 5th Countess of Castile

== N ==
- Nahirqo (reigned between 170–150 BC) Queen of Kush
- Navarre of Soule, Viscountess of Soule
- Nawidemak (1st century BC or AD) Queen regnant of Kush
- Neferneferuaten (possibly identical with Nefertiti), Pharaoh of Egypt for a short time between 1336 and 1333 BC
- Neithhotep, queen and co-ruler of Egypt, possibly the first known female ruler
- Nicole of Châtillon (1424–1479), Countess of Penthièvre, 1454–79
- Nino, Regent Princess of Mingrelia, 1804–11
- Nuña Fernandez (Munia Domna), Lady of Amaya, Lady of Lara
- Nuña Núñez, Lady of Amaya
- Nyarroh (1880–1914), female chieftain in Barri region of Sierra Leone

== O ==
- Oda of Altena, Regent Countess of Tecklenburg, 1202–06, for her son Otto (d. 1263)
- Oda of Hornes, Countess of Hornes
- Oda of Tecklenburg (d. 1244), also known as Gertrude of Tecklenburg, Heiress of Rheda
- Olimpia Ludovisi, Princess of Piombino, 1699–1700
- Olimpia Mancini (1639–1708), Countess of Soissons
- Olympias II of Epirus (3rd century BC), regent of Epirus
- Onna of Esens, Heiress of Esens, Wittmund and Stedesdorf

== P ==
- Paola Colonna, Lady of Piombino, 1441–45
- Paolina Belmonte: Princess (Reichsfürstin) Donna Francesca di Paola Pignatelli y Aymerich Squarciafico Pinelli Ravaschieri Fieschi (1824–1911), 10th Princess of Belmonte, 5th Princess of the Holy Roman Empire, 3rd Princess of Muro Leccese, Grandee of Spain 1st Class, 9th Duchess of Acerenza, 3rd Duchess of Corigliano d'Otranto, 21st Countess of Copertino, 21st Marchioness of Galatone, 7th Marchioness of Argensola, 6th Marchioness of San Vicente, 11th Baroness of Badolato, Signora di Veglie, Leverano, San Cosimo &c.
- Paula of Maine, heiress of Maine
- Pauline of Anhalt-Bernburg, Regent Princess of Lippe, 1802–20, for Leopold II
- Peronelle of Chappes, Lady of Juilly and Lady of Chanloc
- Peronelle of Montfort, Lady of Rambouillet
- Petronila of Aragon, Queen of Aragon, 1137–64
- Petronille of Comminges (1185–1251), also known as Perenelle of Comminges, Viscountess of Marsan & Countess of Bigorre, 1225–51
- Petronille of Joigny (1230–82), Lady of Chateau-Renard, 1237–82
- Pheretima (d. 515 BC) regent of Cyrene
- Philiberte of Luxemburg-Saint-Pol (d. 1539), Countess of Charny
- Philiberte of Savoy, 1st Duchess of Nemours, 1498–1524
- Philippa of Clermont, Lady of Nesle
- Philippa of Harnes, Countess of Harnes, 1230–48
- Philippa Plantagenet, 5th Countess of Ulster, 13th Lady of Clare & 5th Countess of Ulster, 1363–1381/82
- Philippa of Lomagne (d. 1286/1294), Viscountess of Lomagne & Auvillar, 1276–1286/1294
- Philippa of Montspedon, Lady of Beaupreau
- Polie of Poitiers-Valentinois, Lady of Baux, 1348–?
- Prabhavatigupta, Queen of Vakataka Dynasty, known as the First female ruler of India
- Pulcheria, Empress of Rome, 450–453

== R ==
- Ragnhild Haraldsdottir, Heiress of Jarald Gulskeg, Jarl of Sogn who brought her father's territory to her husband Halfdan the Black Gudrodsson (808–848)
- Ranavalona I, Queen of Madagascar, 1828–61
- Ranavalona II, Queen of Madagascar, 1868–83
- Ranavalona III, Queen of Madagascar, 1883–97
- Rasoherina, Queen of Madagascar, 1863–68
- Regine of Goth, also known as Reine of Got or Goth, Heiress to Lomagne & Auvillars
- Renee of Anjou (d. 1597), Duchess of Saint-Fergau, 1568–?, Marquise of Mézières, 1568–?
- Renee of Orléans (1508–1515), Countess of Dunois, Tancarville & Montgomery, 1513–15
- Renee of Savoy (1535–1587), Countess of Tende
- Ricciarda Malaspina (1497–1553), Duchess of Carrara, Duchess of Massa
- Richardis of Dyck, Lady of Dyck
- Richardis of Tecklenburg, Heiress of Tecklenburg-Ibbenburen
- Richinza of Spitzenburg (d. 1092/1110), Heiress of Kirchen
- Roscie du Caylar (d. after 1192), Lady of Uzes
- Razia Sultana (1236–1240), Ruler of India
- Rusudan of Georgia, Queen Regnant, 1223–45.
- Rudrama Devi (Rani), (1259−1289), Ruler of Kakatiya dynasty in the Deccan Plateau, India

== S ==
- Salome Alexandra (141–67 BC) Queen of Judea
- Samsi (8th century BC) Arabian queen
- Sancha of Aybar (1017–70), Lady of Aybar
- Sancha of León (1037–1065), Queen of León
- Seondeok of Silla (632–647), Queen of Korea
- Shajar al-Durr (?–1257) Sultana of Egypt
- Shammuramat (811–808 BC) Regent of Assyria
- Shanakdakhete, Queen of Kush
- Sibilla of Cerdanya, Viscountess of Cerdanya, c. 1134–41
- Sibylla of Jerusalem, Queen of Jerusalem
- Sibylle of Baux (1255–1294), also known as Simone of Bauge, Sibylle of Bauge, Lady of Baux, Bresse & Miribel, 1268–93
- Sibylle of Baux, Lady of Baux, 1305–48
- Sibylle of Burgundy (1152–1201), Countess of Chalon
- Sibylle of Chateaurenault, Lady of Chateaurenault, 1140–?
- Sibylle of Palau, Viscountess of Bas
- Sobekneferu, Pharaoh of Egypt from 1806 to 1802 BC
- Soma (1st century) Queen of Funan, likely the first monarch of Cambodia
- Sophie of Arnsberg and Rietberg, Heiress of the Lordship of Rheda
- Sophie of Bar, Countess of Bar, 1033–92
- Stephanie of Ibelin, Lady of Nablus
- Stephanie of Milly (d. 1197), Lady of Oultrejourdain
- Suzanne of Bourbon (1491–1521), Countess of Clermont-en-Beauvaisis, Forez, Gien, & La Marche, 1503–21, Duchess of Auvergne & Bourbon, 1503–21

== T ==
- Tabua (c. 675 BC) Arab queen
- Tamar of Georgia (1160–1213), Queen Regnant of Georgia from 1184 to 1213
- Te'el-hunu (c. 690 BC) Arab queen
- [eodora Gallucio (1200–60), Countess of Teano
- Teresa of León, Sovereign Countess of Portugal
- Teresa Álvarez de Azagra, Lady of Albarracín, c. 1281–c. 1283
- Teresa Antonia Manrique de Lara y Mendoza, 7th Marquesa de Canete, c. 1590
- Teresa Martins de Menezes (1290?), 5th Lady of Alburquerque
- Teresa de Entenza (1300–1327), Countess of Urgel, 1309–27
- Teuta (231–228/227 BC) Illyrian queen
- Theodora (11th century), Byzantine Empress, 1042, 1055–56
- Theodora Komnena, Empress of Trebizond, 1284–85
- Tiburge I of Orange (d. 1150), also known as Tiburtia of Orange, Countess of Orange
- Tiburge II of Orange, Countess of ½ of Orange, 1173–82. Married Bertrand of Baux (d. 1181).
- Tiburge III of Orange (d. 1180), Countess of Orange
- Toda of Ribagorza (d. 1011), Countess of Ribagorza
- Toda Galindez of Aragon (890–?), Countess of Sobrarbe
- Tomyris (d. 530 BC) Queen of the Massagetae
- Twosret (d. 1189 BC) Pharaoh of Egypt

== U ==
- Ungu, Raja of Patani, 1624–1635
- Urraca of Castile, Queen of Castile and León, 1109–26
- Urraca of Covarrubias (d. 1039), Lady of Infantado de Covarrubias.
- Urraca of Zamora, Lady of Zamora
- Urraca Paterna (d. 861), Countess of Castile

== V ==
- Valence of Pallars-Jussa, Countess of Pallars-Jussa
- Valentina Visconti (1366–1408), Countess of Asti, Countess of Vertus, 1373–1408
- Valpurge of Creyssel
- Verena of Freiburg (d. 1320), Heiress of Wartenberg and Mausach
- Victoire Armande Josephe of Rohan (1743–1807), Princess of Maubuisson
- Queen Victoria
- Violant of Hungary, Lady of Omelades, Lady of Montpellier
- Violant of Hungary, Viscountess of Millau

== W ==
- Wilhelmina of the Netherlands, Queen of the Netherlands, 1890–1948
- Wisutthithewi, Queen of Lanna, 1564–1578

== Y ==
- Yatie (c. 730 BC) Arab queen
- Yolande of Anjou, Duchess of Lorraine, 1473–83, Duchess of Bar, 1480–83
- Yolande of Brittany (1218–1272), also known as Yolande of Dreux, Countess of Penthièvre, 1237–72 (as her dowry); Countess of Porhoet (by grant of her brother); Countess Regent of Angoulême and La Marche, 1250–56, for her son Hugh XII of Lusignan
- Yolande of Burgundy (1248–2280), Countess of Nevers, 1262–80
- Yolande of Châtillon (1223–1254), Lady of Donzy, 1225–54
- Yolande of Dreux (1212–1248), Countess of Ossone
- Yolande of Flanders (1331–1395), Lady of Cassel & Countess of Marle
- Yolande of Montfort (1263–1330), Countess of Montfort-l'Aumary

== Z ==
- Zabibe (738–733 BC) Arab queen
- Zenobia (267–274), Queen of the Palmyrene Empire
- Zoe, Byzantine Empress, 1028–50
