= 1423 =

1423 in various calendars
- Gregorian calendar: 1423; MCDXXIII
- Ab urbe condita: 2176
- Armenian calendar: 872; ԹՎ ՊՀԲ
- Assyrian calendar: 6173
- Balinese saka calendar: 1344–1345
- Bengali calendar: 829–830
- Berber calendar: 2373
- English Regnal year: 1 Hen. 6 – 2 Hen. 6
- Buddhist calendar: 1967
- Burmese calendar: 785
- Byzantine calendar: 6931–6932
- Chinese calendar: 壬寅年 (Water Tiger); 4120 or 3913 — to — 癸卯年 (Water Rabbit); 4121 or 3914
- Coptic calendar: 1139–1140
- Discordian calendar: 2589
- Ethiopian calendar: 1415–1416
- Hebrew calendar: 5183–5184
- Hindu calendars
- Vikram Samvat: 1479–1480
- Shaka Samvat: 1344–1345
- Kali Yuga: 4523–4524
- Holocene calendar: 11423
- Igbo calendar: 423–424
- Iranian calendar: 801–802
- Islamic calendar: 826–827
- Japanese calendar: Ōei 30 (応永３０年)
- Javanese calendar: 1337–1338
- Julian calendar: 1423; MCDXXIII
- Korean calendar: 3756
- Minguo calendar: 489 before ROC 民前489年
- Nanakshahi calendar: −45
- Thai solar calendar: 1965–1966
- Tibetan calendar: ཆུ་ཕོ་སྟག་ལོ་ (male Water-Tiger); 1549 or 1168 or 396 — to — ཆུ་མོ་ཡོས་ལོ་ (female Water-Hare); 1550 or 1169 or 397

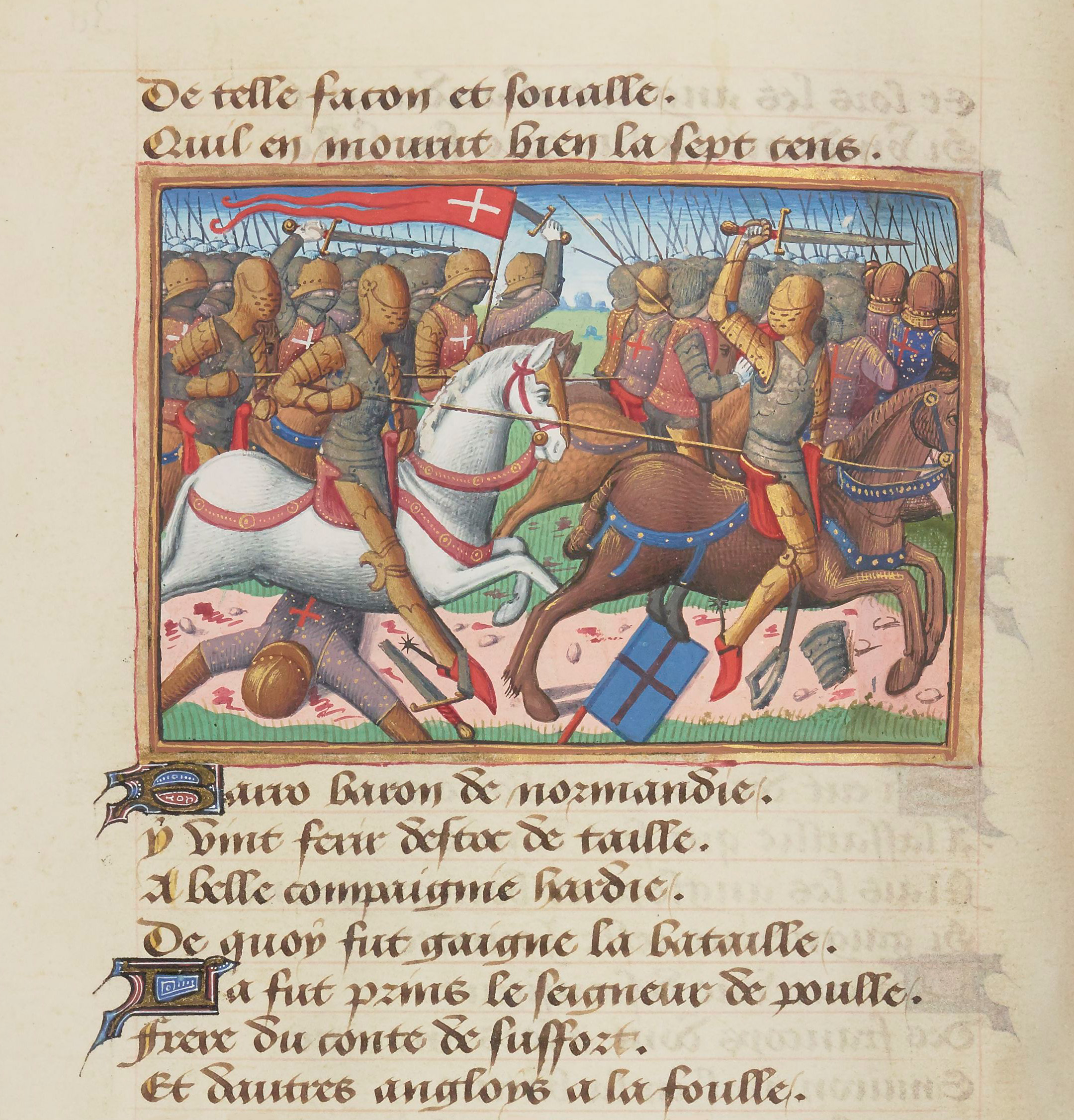
September 26: English Army suffers 1,400 deaths in defeat by French Army at Battle of La Brossinière.

Year 1423 (MCDXXIII) was a common year starting on Friday of the Julian calendar.

== Events ==
=== January–March ===
- January 6 – The Electorate of Saxony merges with the Margravate of Meissen and the Duchy of Saxe-Wittenberg.
- February 11 – Hundred Years War: The island of Tombelaine, off of the coast of France, is taken by English forces in order to be used as a base to attack Mont Saint-Michel.
- March 7 – After failing to defeat Hushang Shah in a siege of Salangpur, the Gujarat Sultan Ahmad Shah I is attacked by Hushang's army while on his way back to Ahmedabad. He wins the battle and resumes his trip home.

=== April–June ===
- April 13 – Hundred Years' War: The Treaty of Amiens is signed as a mutual defense treaty between the Duchy of Burgundy, the Duchy of Brittany and the Kingdom of England.
- April 15 – Francesco Foscari is elected the new Doge of the Republic of Venice after the death of Tommaso Mocenigo. He will serve as the Venetian Republic's executive for 34 years before being forced to abdicate a few days before his death in 1457.
- April 27 – Hussite Wars – Battle of Hořice: The Taborites decisively beat the Utraquists.
- April 28 – Ashikaga Yoshimochi abdicates as shogun of Japan and is succeeded by his son, Ashikaga Yoshikazu.
- May 18 – The Treaty of Melno signed on September 27 to end the Gollub War between the State of the Teutonic Order (on the Baltic Sea, with a capital at Marienburg) and the alliance of Poland and Lithuania, is ratified by all three parties.
- May 22 – Byzantine–Ottoman Wars: After a two-day battle, Turakhan Beg, Ottoman governor of Thessaly, breaks through the Hexamilion wall, and ravages the Peloponnese Peninsula in Greece.
- May 23 – The Sultan of Gujarat, Ahmad Shah I is finally able to return home to reassume the throne.
- June 10 – Gil Sánchez Muñoz y Carbón, a Spanish Roman Catholic bishop, is elected by bishops in Avignon as the third "antipope", succeeding the late Antipope Benedict XIII, who had died on May 23 after a reign of more than 20 years. Sánchez Muñoz takes the name of Antipope Clement VIII as the Avignon clergy disagree with Pope Martin V of Rome.

=== July–September ===
- July 10 – Pope Martin V gives his approval of the Treaty of Melno.
- July 31 – Hundred Years' War – Battle of Cravant: The French army is defeated at Cravant, on the banks of the River Yonne near Auxerre, by the English and their Burgundian allies.
- August 2 – Ataullah Muhammad Shah I begins a 50-year reign as the Sultan of Kedah in what is now Malaysia, following the death of his father, Sulaiman Shah I, who had reigned for 50 years after becoming Sultan in 1373.
- August 12 – The Treaty of Sveti Srdj ends the Second Scutari War, waged between the Serbian Despotate and the Venetian Republic, over Scutari, and other former possessions of Zeta, captured by the Venetians.
- August – China's Emperor Cheng Zu launches his fourth campaign against the Northern Yuan.
- September 14 – The first occupation force from the Republic of Venice arrives at the Greek city of Thessalonia, recently purchased from the Ottoman Empire with six galleys entering the harbor.
- September 26 – Hundred Years' War: The Battle of La Brossinière is fought in France near Bourgon in what is now the Mayenne département. The English force of 2,800 men, under the command of Sir John De la Pole, is crushed by the armies of France, Anjou and Maine, and the English suffer more than 1,400 deaths.
- September 28 – The English nobility swear their loyalty to King Henry VI.

=== October–December ===
- October 20 – The Second Parliament of King Henry VI of England assembles after having been summoned on September 1. The House of Commons, led by John Russell, will consider laws until its adjournment on February 28.
- November 16 – On behalf of the infant King Henry VI of England, Duke of Bedford, Regent for France, confirms the 1315 Norman Charter.
- November 17 – Three weeks before his second birthday, King Henry VI of England is brought before the assembled members of the House of Lords and the House of Commons for the first time.
- December 15 – After a two-year expedition to Byzantium, Giovanni Aurispa arrives in Venice with largest and finest collection of Greek language texts up to that time, including 238 ancient manuscripts.
- December 24 – Hussite Wars: In what is now the Czech Republic, General Sigismund Korybut, commander of the Hussite Army, withdraws his troops from Prague on the orders of Vytautas, Grand Duke of Lithuania and Władysław II Jagiełło, King of Poland.

=== Date unknown ===
- The three independent boroughs of Pamplona are united into a single town by royal decree, after centuries of feuds.
- Dan II of Wallachia, with Hungarian help, wins two battles against the Ottomans.

== Births ==
- April 4 – Johann II of Nassau-Saarbrücken, Count of Nassau-Saarbrücken (1429–1472) (d. 1472)
- May 18 – Lady Katherine Percy, English nobility (d. 1475)
- May 30 – Georg von Peuerbach, Austrian astronomer (d. 1461)
- June 2 – Ferdinand I of Naples (d. 1494)
- June 15 – Gabriele Sforza, Archbishop of Milan (d. 1457)
- July 3 – Louis XI, monarch of the House of Valois, King of France from 1461 to 1483 (d. 1483)
- July 6 – Antonio Manetti, Italian mathematician and architect (d. 1497)
- August 24 – Thomas Rotherham, English cleric (d. 1500)
- September 10 – Eleanor, Princess of Asturias (d. 1425)
- August – Demetrios Chalkokondyles, Greek scholar (d. 1511)

== Deaths ==
- January 23 – Margaret of Bavaria, Burgundian regent (b. 1363)
- March – Richard Whittington, Lord Mayor of London (b. 1358)
- May 23 – Antipope Benedict XIII (b. 1328)
- October 20 – Henry Bowet, Archbishop of York
- November 1 – Nicholas Eudaimonoioannes, Byzantine diplomat
- December 15 – Michael Küchmeister von Sternberg, Grand Master of the Teutonic Knights
