= Chemin de Cocaigne =

Roman road in Gaul

The Chemin de Cocaigne was a Gallo-Roman way of Gaul in what is now France, later restored under the Carolingians, running from the Cotentin peninsula of what would become Normandy, skirting Brittany, to Gascony in the southwest of Gaul, beyond Aquitaine. The section called the chemin gravelais ("gravelled road") linked Normandy and Anjou. The route was alluded to as the chemin du Roy (the "King's road") in a document of 1454. For pilgrims to Santiago de Compostela it was one of the feeder routes leading to Poitiers, where it joined the Way of St James beyond the Pyrenees.

This route, the only route that was fit for wheeled vehicles, was a long-range commercial link that gained strategic significance in wartime; where it crossed Bourgon at the meadow of Le Pavement, the Battle of La Brossinière was fought along the chemin in September 1423, a victory for French in the Hundred Years' War; the English forces were forced to abandon their baggage train, which had dictated their course with its heavily laden wagons.

Parts of the route may be traced today from the north to south, starting from the département de la Mayenne. Even where the road was ploughed up centuries ago, some toponyms may still reveal its former passage. South of La Gravelle the route passed through Le Pertre, near which the hamlets of Saint-Cyr-le-Gravelais (1 km) and Ruillé-le-Gravelais (5.3 km) record the passage of the route, which still may be traced on a paved secondary route leading due south of Le Pertre to the crossroads at Saint-Poix. Two kilometers southeast of Loroux, a place that still bears the name of le Carrefour appears to indicate the intersection with a way that led from Carhaix to Lisieux. The village of La Pellerine recalls the throngs of strangers who passed as pilgrims; half a kilometer to the south is La Gascoignerie, recalling the route's southern destination. Often way-stations sited where roads intersected the main route bear names that indicated the side road's destination.

The Chemin de Cocaigne still marks sections of the boundary between the départements of Mayenne and Ille-et-Vilaine, for example the nine-kilometer stretch between Bourgon and the Forêt du Pertre, which formed a buffer in the Middle Ages between Mayenne and Brittany.
