= Auguste Vallet de Viriville =

French archivist and historian

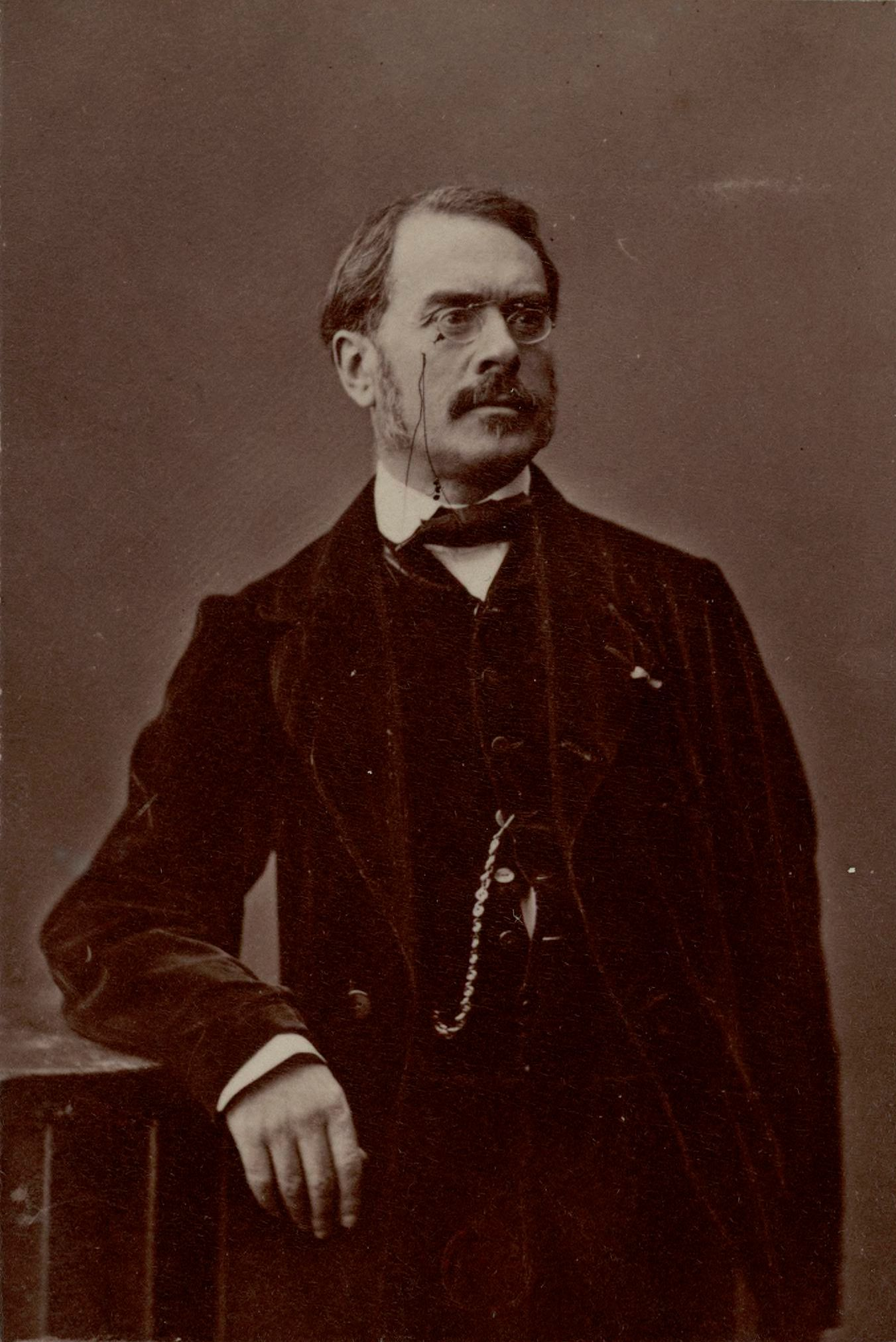
Auguste Vallet de Viriville

Auguste Vallet de Viriville, after 1858 known as Auguste Vallet (23 April 1815, in Paris – 20 February 1868, in Paris) was a French archivist and historian.

He received his education at the École des Chartes in Paris, obtaining his degree as an archivist-paleographer in 1837. Afterwards, he worked as an archivist for the département of Aube, and in 1847 attained a professorship at the École des Chartes.

He served as vice-president of the Société de l'École des chartes, and was a resident member of the Société nationale des antiquaires de France (1855–68).

== Selected works ==
- Les archives historiques du département de l'Aube, 1841 – Historical archives of Aube.
- Essai sur les archives historiques du chapitre de l'Eglise Cathédrale de Notre-Dame à St-Omer (Pas-de-Calais), 1844 – Essay on the historical archives of the chapter of the Cathedral Church of Our Lady in St-Omer (Pas-de-Calais).
- Histoire de l'instruction publique en Europe et principalement en France, 1849 – History of public education in Europe, mainly France.
- Des ouvrages alchimiques attribués à Nicolas Flamel, 1856 – Alchemical works attributed to Nicolas Flamel.
- Chronique de Charles VII; (as editor; 3 volumes, 1858) – Chronicles of Charles VII.
- Chronique de la Pucelle, ou Chronique de Cousinot; (as editor, 1859) – Chronique de la Pucelle, or chronicles of Guillaume Cousinot de Montreuil.
- Histoire de Charles VII, roi de France, et de son epoque, 1403-1461 (3 volumes, 1863–65) – History of Charles VII of France, and his era, 1403–1461.
- Procès de condamnation de Jeanne d'arc dite la Pucelle d'Orléans, 1867 – Process of condemnation of Joan of Arc, known as the Maid of Orléans.
