= Jean VII, Count of Harcourt =

French nobleman

- Born: 1369
- Died: 18 December 1452; Châtellerault
- Buried: Franciscan convent at Châtellerault
- Noble family: House of Harcourt
- Spouse: Marie of Alençon
- Issue: Jean, Count of Aumale; Marie, Countess of Aumale; Jeanne, Countess of Harcourt
- Father: John VI of Harcourt
- Mother: Catherine de Bourbon

Jean VII d'Harcourt (1369 – 18 December 1452, Châtellerault) was a French nobleman. He was Count of Harcourt, Count of Aumale, Viscount of Châtellerault, and Seigneur of Mézières, of Elbeuf, of Lillebonne, of La Saussaye etc.

He was the son of John VI of Harcourt, Count of Harcourt, and of Catherine de Bourbon, sister-in-law of King Charles V of France. On 17 March 1390, he married Marie of Alençon (29 March 1373 – 1417), princess of the blood, daughter of Pierre II, Count of Alençon and of Marie Chamaillart d'Anthenaise, Viscountess of Beaumont. They had:

- Jean VIII of Harcourt, Count of Aumale, lieutenant and captain general of Normandy, killed at the Battle of Verneuil.
- Marie of Harcourt (1398–1476), wife of Antoine of Lorraine, Count of Vaudémont, who is the origin of the Harcourt-Lorraine branch.
- Jeanne of Harcourt (1399–1456)

He participated in the siege of Taillebourg, where he was made a knight by his uncle Louis II, Duke of Bourbon, and at the siege of Tunis and Harfleur. He distinguished himself at the Battle of Agincourt in 1415, where he was taken prisoner.

In 1418, his castle at Harcourt was taken by the English. Through fear of king Henry of England, the count de Harcourt had retired within his castle of Aumale, with all his dependants; whither on a certain day, under the appearance of a visit to pay his compliments, came his cousin, Sir James de Harcourt, attended by about sixty combatants. He purposely dismounted at the gate of the castle, which, on his being recognised, was instantly opened, and every honour was paid him by the officers of the count. Part of his men entered with him, and he went to the count, who joyously received him, saying "Fair cousin, you are welcome." Sir James had ordered the remainder of his men to come to the castle when they had put up their horses in the town; and shortly after some conversation together respecting the wars now going on in France, seeing the opportunity was proper, Sir James took the count by the hand, and said "My lord, I make you a prisoner in the king's name."

The count, much astonished, replied "Fair cousin, what do you mean? I am the king's man, as you know, and have never acted to his prejudice." However, in spite of his protestations and claims of kindred, or any other excuses, he was detained a prisoner and placed by Sir James under a secure guard. On the morrow, after Sir James had seized on all the moveables within the castle, and appointed a part of his men for its defence, he departed, and carried the count with him to the castle of Crotoy.

Sir James, by these means, got from the count a beautiful chesnut horse, with a short tail, which was afterward famous as a war-horse. After that day, the count remained prisoner to his cousin; but he was frequently transported from one castle to another, and it was commonly reported that he was thus kept prisoner with the consent of his son, John de Harcourt, count of Aumale. His titles of Count of Aumale and Count of Harcourt were usurped and given to Richard de Beauchamp, 13th Earl of Warwick and Thomas Beaufort, Duke of Exeter.

His cousin, King Charles VI, therefore supported him and named him captain general of Normandy, and gave him a gift of 1000 books. On his death in 1452, he was buried at the Franciscan convent at Châtellerault, which he had founded. With him, the oldest branch of Harcourt became extinct.

== Sources ==
- Cokayne, George Edward; Gibbs, Vicary; Doubleday, H. Arthur, eds. (1926). Complete peerage of England, Scotland, Ireland, Great Britain and the United Kingdom, extant, extinct or dormant (Eardley of Spalding to Goojerat). Vol. 5 (2nd ed.). London: The St. Catherine Press, Ltd. p. 203.
- Hirschbiegel, Jan (2003). Étrennes: Untersuchungen zum höfischen Geschenkverkehr im spatmittelalterlichen Frankreich der Zeit Kong Karls VI (1380-1422) (in German). R. Oldenbourg Verlag.
- (in French) Gilles-André de La Roque, Histoire généalogique de la maison de Harcourt, 1662
- (in French) Dom Lenoir, Preuves généalogiques et historiques de la Maison d'Harcourt, 1907
- (in French) Georges Martin, Histoire et Généalogie de la Maison d'Harcourt, 1994
- (in French) Dictionnaire de biographie française, 1989
