= Marie d'Alençon =

- Princess of the Blood; Countess of Harcourt and of Aumale; Viscountess of Châtellerault; Baroness of Elbeuf, of Mézières, of Lillebone, of La Saussaye
- Born: 29 March 1373; Chateau d'Essay, Orne, France
- Died: 1417 (aged about 44); Chateau d'Harcourt, Calvados, Normandy, France
- Noble family: House of Valois
- Spouse: Jean VII, Count of Harcourt
- Issue: Jean, Count of Aumale; Marie, Countess of Aumale; Jeanne, Countess of Harcourt
- Father: Pierre II, Count of Alençon
- Mother: Marie Chamaillart, Viscountess of Beaumont-au-Maine

Marie d'Alençon (29 March 1373 – 1417) was a French noblewoman, a Princess of the Blood, and the wife of Jean VII of Harcourt, Count of Harcourt and of Aumale, Viscount of Châtellerault, Baron of Elbeuf, of Mézières, of Lillebone, of La Saussaye.

== Family ==
Marie was born on 29 March 1373, at the Chateau d'Essay, Orne, France, the daughter of Pierre II, Count of Alençon (1340 – 20 September 1404), nephew of King Philip VI of France, and Marie Chamaillart, Viscountess of Beaumont-au-Maine.

Marie's father was knighted in 1350. At the Battle of Poitiers in 1356, he was taken hostage in exchange for King John II of France, and he did not return home until 1370. On 20 October 1371, he married Marie Chamaillart (died 18 November 1425 at Chateau d'Argentan), by whom he had eight children. Marie was their eldest child.

=== List of siblings ===
- Pierre d'Alençon (1374 – 1375)
- Jean d'Alençon (1375 – 1376)
- Marie d'Alençon (1377 – 1377)
- Jeanne d'Alençon (1378 – 6 August 1403)
- Catherine of Alençon (1380 Verneuil-sur-Avre – 25 June 1462. She married firstly in 1411, Peter d' Évreux, Infante of Navarre, Count of Mortain, and secondly on 1 October 1413, Louis VII, Duke of Bavaria–Ingolstadt. By her last marriage she had a son Johann (Born 6 February 1415) and an unnamed daughter. Both children died young.
- Marguerite d'Alençon (1383- after 1400). Nun at Argentan.
- Jean, Duke of Alençon (9 May 1385- 25 October 1415 at The Battle of Agincourt). On 26 June 1396, he married Marie of Brittany (18 February 1391- 18 December 1446). They had five children, including his heir, Jean II, Duke of Alençon.

== Marriage ==
Marie married John VII, Count of Harcourt and of Aumale (1369 – 18 December 1452) in Paris on 17 March 1390 shortly before her seventeenth birthday. He was the son of John VI of Harcourt, Count of Harcourt, and Catherine de Bourbon. The marriage produced three children.

Marie died in 1417 about two years after her husband, having distinguished himself at the Battle of Agincourt, was taken prisoner by the victorious English troops, led by King Henry V. John died in 1452.

=== Issue ===
- Jean VIII of Harcourt, Count of Aumale (9 April 1396 Chateau d'Harcourt, Calvados – 17 August 1424 at the Battle of Verneuil). He was the senior French commander at the battle. By mistress Marguerite de Preullay, he had one illegitimate son, Louis II of Harcourt
- Marie of Harcourt, Countess of Aumale (9 September 1398 Chateau d'Harcourt, Calvados – 19 April 1476). She married, on 12 August 1416, Antoine of Vaudémont, Count of Vaudémont, Sire of Joinville (1401 – 22 March 1458), by whom she had five children including Frederic II of Vaudémont, Count of Vaudemont, Sire of Joinville (May 1428 – 31 August 1470 Joinville), who in his turn in 1445, married Yolande de Bar of Anjou, elder sister of Margaret of Anjou, Queen-consort of England.
- Jeanne of Harcourt, Countess of Harcourt (11 September 1399 Chateau d' Harcourt, Calvados -1456). She married firstly in 1414, Jean, Seigneur de Rieux et de Rochfort, Baron d'Ancenis (died 1431). She married secondly in 1434, Bertrand de Dinan, Baron de Chateaubriant, Marshal of Brittany. She had issue.

== Ancestry ==
Ancestors of Marie d'Alençon

Charles, Count of Valois
Charles II, Count of Alençon
Margaret, Countess of Anjou
Peter II, Count of Alençon
Fernando de la Cerda
María de la Cerda
Juana Núñez de Lara
Marie of Alençon
Guillaume I Chamaillard, Lord of Anthenaise
Guillaume II Chamaillard, Lord of Anthenaise
Eramburge
Marie Chamaillard, Viscountess of Beaumont
Jean II de Brienne, Viscount of Beaumont
Marie de Brienne, Viscountess of Beaumont-au-Maine
Isabeau d'Harcourt
