= Battle of La Brossinière =

Battle during the Hundred Years' War

Coordinates: 47.765°N 0.741°W

- Part of Hundred Years' War
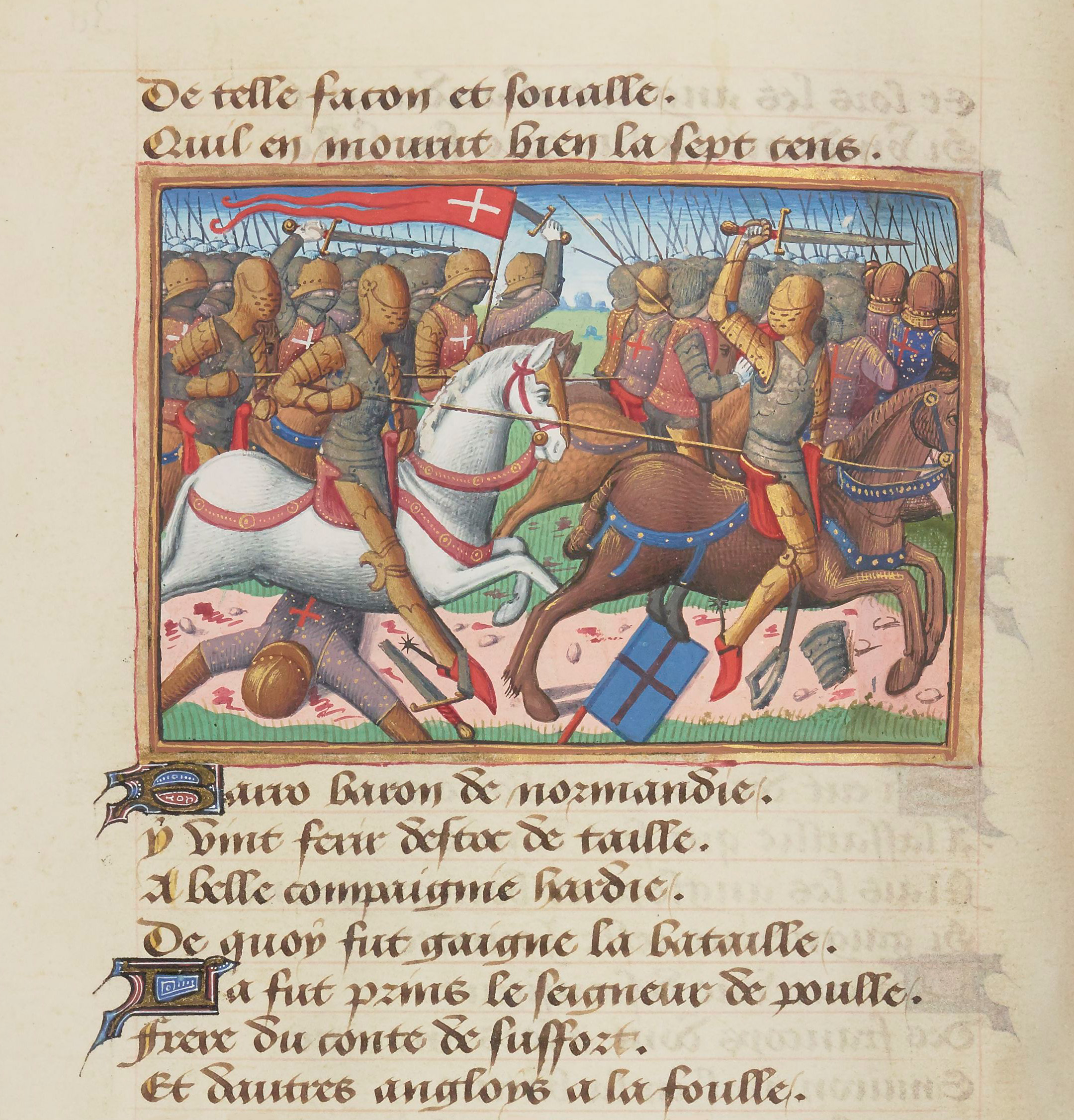
Date	26 September 1423
Location	La Brossinière, France
Result	French victory

Belligerents
France; Anjou; Maine; Brittany(?)	England

Commanders and leaders
Ambroise of Loré; John VIII of Harcourt; André de Lohéac; Louis of Trémigon	John de la Pole (surrendered); Thomas Aubourg (surrendered); Thomas Cliffeton (surrendered)

Strength
2,400 soldiers	2,000 soldiers 800 archers

Casualties and losses
1 knight and a few others (of no title)	1,400–1,700 killed 30 captured

The Battle of La Brossinière or Battle of la Gravelle (French – la "besoigne" de la Brossinière) was a battle of the Hundred Years' War on 26 September 1423. It occurred at La Brossinière (commune of Bourgon, Mayenne), between the forces of England and France, shortly after hostilities had resumed, following the battle of Agincourt (1415).

The English force commanded by Sir John De la Pole, brother of William de la Pole, Earl of Suffolk, which had returned to Normandy after a pillaging expedition to Anjou and Maine, suffered a crushing defeat. Chronique de la Pucelle reports that "there were great deeds of arms done" and that the English "were beaten in the field and there were fourteen to fifteen hundred killed"

== Background ==
The battle of Agincourt had been particularly damaging for the nobility of the region. After this battle, the English regent John, Duke of Bedford, given the titles of Duke of Anjou and Count of Maine, ordered a systematic conquest, though this was not effected without resistance.

In September 1423, John de la Pole left Normandy with 2000 soldiers and 800 archers to go raiding in Maine and Anjou. He seized Segré, and there mustered a huge collection of loot and a herd of 1,200 bulls and cows, before setting off to return to Normandy, taking hostages as he went.

Queen Yolande of Aragon, mother-in-law to Charles VII of France, who was in her town of Angers, had the first thought of avenging the affront and the damage to her county, and gave orders for such a mission to the most valiant of the French king's partisans, Ambroise de Loré, who had been commander of Sainte-Suzanne since 1422. Knowing that John VIII of Harcourt, count of Aumale and governor of Touraine, Anjou and Maine, was then in Tours and preparing an expedition into Normandy, Amboise despatched a message to Aumale by letter. The governor came in haste to Laval, bringing the troops he had already gathered "and summoning men from all the lands he passed through".

== Prelude ==
The promptest and best-armed response came from the baron of Coulonges, whose services were accepted despite his current disgrace with the governor, who merely enjoined Coulonges not to present himself to him. This whole concentration of force was all gathered together very rapidly. D'Aumale had not yet arrived in Laval on Friday 24 September, but set off again as early as the Saturday morning, on his way to take up a position on the road to follow the English, sending scouts to keep an eye on their march and to inform him of it exactly. It was early at the Le Bourgneuf-la-Forêt, from which he sent word to Anne de Laval at Vitré "to pray her that she would send him the army of her sons, named André of Lohéac, then a young man of twelve years; which she did very willingly, and sent him to accompany it, master Guy XIV de Laval, lord of Mont-Jean, and all the people of the seigneurie of Laval, with several other of their vassals that she could recover and bring in promptly from other parts".

Aumale then took counsel from the bastard of Alençon, the sire de Mont-Jean, Louis of Trémigon and Ambroise of Loré. He appraised them that the English were three leagues off and that they would pass La Brossinière, following the main road from Brittany, the following Sunday morning.

In total, Wavrin states the French army as 6,000 strong, both men-at-arms and common soldiers but his claims are disputed as his chronicle is deemed untrustworthy.

== Battlefield ==
The battle was fought on the former chemin gravelais, or "chemin du Roy" as it was referred to in 1454, a famous ancient road built to speed up the journey time for carriages between Anjou and Normandy.

== Battle ==
Two hours after the troops had been drawn up in battle order, the English scouts who were giving chase arrived and met the French skirmishers. The scouts ran them down and forced them to withdraw into the line of battle, where they stood their ground. The English could no longer pursue them, since a massed body of cavalry was in front of them, withdrawing towards the count of Aumale; they were only a bowshot away when the troops revealed themselves.

The English, with a long baggage train but marching in good order, emplaced great stakes, behind which they could retire in case of cavalry attack. The infantry moved to the front and the convoy of carts and troops closed the route to the rear. Trémigon, Loré and Coulonges wanted to make an attempt on the defences, but they were too strong; they turned and attacked the English in the flank, who were broken and cornered against a large ditch, losing their order. The foot soldiers then advanced and fought hand-to-hand. The English were unable to withstand the attack for long.

The result was a butchery in which 1,200 to 1,400 men of the English forces perished on the field, with 2-300 killed in the pursuit. Others, including Sir John de la Pole, Thomas Aubourg and Thomas Cliffeton, surrendered; only 120 got away. On the French side, only a single knight was lost, John Le Roux, and "a few others [of no title]" ("peu d'autres"). The 16-year-old André of Lohéac, the future Marshal of France, was knighted with several of his companions. The lady of Laval had the dead buried.

== Aftermath ==
Aumale moved into Normandy, laid siege to Avranches and looted the suburbs of Saint-Lô. An English relief army advanced on his position and forced him to abandon the siege.
