= Jean VIII d'Harcourt =

Count of Harcourt (1396–1424)

Jean VIII of Harcourt (9 April 1396 – 17 August 1424, Battle of Verneuil) was a count of Aumale. He was the son of Jean VII of Harcourt, count of Harcourt, and of Marie of Alençon, a "princess of the blood".

== Life ==
He fought the English at the Battle of Agincourt and Battle of la Brossinière. He was appointed lieutenant and captain general of Normandy, and captain of the town of castle of Rouen, in 1417. He was killed at the Battle of Verneuil, and buried at Le Saussaie in 1424.

He had one, illegitimate son (by Marguerite de Preullay, viscountess of Dreux), Louis II of Harcourt (1424–1479), bishop of Béziers (1451), archbishop of Narbonne (1451), bishop of Bayeux (1460) and Latin patriarch of Jerusalem (1460–79).

Without a legitimate heir, his office of captain of Mont Saint-Michel passed to his cousin Jean d'Orléans, comte de Dunois (companion of Joan of Arc, and husband of Marie of Harcourt), and his title of count of Aumale to his brother-in-law Antoine of Vaudémont.
