= Gaboimilla =

Gaboimilla is a mythical queen of a tribe of Amazons, all-women warrior groups, said to reside in Southern Chile during the period of the Spanish Conquest. Her people were said to have allowed males only as a means of procreation and exiled male children to live with their fathers. Gaboimilla's kingdom was said to have been rich in gold and skilled in the manufacture of luxury goods but subordinate to the Leuchengorma people. The existence of Gaboimilla and her people has not been proven and they could merely be mythological.

== Description ==
Gaboimilla was first described in a 1543 report by Augustin Zarate, secretary of the Royal Council of Spain. Zarate recounted the tale, told to him by South American indigenous people from the Leuchengorma people.

Zarate described Gaboimilla as "Queen of the South American Amazons of Chile" and head of a large and rich kingdom populated only by women. The kingdom was said to lie 50 leagues beyond the then-extent of Spanish exploration in an area of Southern Chile bounded by two rivers. The kingdom was rich in gold resources—so much so that Gaboimilla's name translates as "Heaven of Gold"—and was famed for its manufacture of luxury goods. Despite this the kingdom was said to have been subordinate to the Leuchengorma and paid regular tribute in gold and goods. The people of Gaboimilla were exclusively female, males being permitted within the kingdom only as a means of procreation. Gaboimilla's people raised the female offspring themselves but sent away any male children to live with their fathers.

== Historicity ==
The legend of Gaboimilla was retold throughout the 16th century and Spanish explorers as well as foreigners such as Ulrich Schmidl and Walter Raleigh sought to prove the existence of hers and other Amazon tribes in South America. However, none were ever proven true and whether Gaboimilla was a real person or a mythological entity remains unknown.
