= Blanche of Ponthieu =

Blanche of Ponthieu (1322 – 12 May 1387), was suo jure Countess of Aumale, and by marriage, Countess of Harcourt.

She was born in 1322 to John II, Count of Aumale (died 1340) and Catherine of Artois, daughter of Philip of Artois and Blanche of Brittany.

Blanche married John V, Count of Harcourt (1320 – 1355) between 1330 and 1340 and had 7 children:

- John VI, Count of Harcourt (1342 – 1389), Count of Aumale and Harcourt
- Louis (died 1388), Viscount of Châtellerault
- William (died 1400), Lord of La Ferté-Imbault
- Philip (1345 – c. 1414), Baron of Bonnetable
- James (1350-1405), Lord of Montgommery
- Joan, married to Raoul de Coucy
- Alix, married to Aubert de Hangest
