= Joan I of Burgundy =

Countess of Burgundy from 1200 to 1205

Joan I
- Countess of Burgundy
- Born: 1191
- Died: 1205 (aged 13–14); Besançon
- Noble family: House of Hohenstaufen
- Father: Otto I, Count of Burgundy
- Mother: Margaret, Countess of Blois

Joan I (1191–1205), also called Joanna of Hohenstaufen, was ruling Countess of Burgundy from 1200 to 1205. She was daughter of Otto I, Count of Burgundy, and Margaret, Countess of Blois.

Born in 1191, Joan was countess from the time of her father's assassination at Besançon in 1200 until her own death in 1205, whereupon her sister, Beatrice II, succeeded her.

Regnal titles
Preceded by Otto I	Countess of Burgundy; 1200–1205	Succeeded by Beatrice II
