= John VI of Harcourt =

John VI of Harcourt (or John of Vaudémont) (1 December 1342 – 28 February 1389) was a count of Harcourt. He was son of John V of Harcourt and Blanche of Ponthieu who was the sister of Jeanne of Ponthieu.

He succeeded to his father's counties of Aumale and Harcourt and barony of Elbeuf on his execution in 1356

In 1359 John married Catherine (1342–1427), daughter of Peter I, Duke of Bourbon. They had the following children:

- Charles (1366–1384)
- Jean VII (1370–1452)
- Louis (1382–1422), viscount of Châtellerault and lord of Aarschot in Mézières, archbishop of Rouen
- Blanche (died 1431), abbess of Fontevraud
- Isabelle (1371–1443), in 1383 married Humbert VI of Thoire en Villars
- Jeanne (1372–1456), dame of Montaigle, in 1393 married William II of Namur
- Marie, in 1405 married Reinald IV, Duke of Guelders and Jülich (died 1423) and in 1426 married Rupert (died 1431), son of Adolf, Duke of Jülich-Berg
- Catherine, nun
- Marguerite (born 1378, date of death unknown), dame of Longueville and of Plaines, married John II lord of Estouteville, mother of Guillaume d'Estouteville
- Jeanne, nun.

== Sources ==
- Autrand, Francoise (1994). Charles V: Le Sage (in French). Fayard.
