= Guillaume Cousinot de Montreuil =

French diplomat, magistrate, and civil servant (1400–1484)

- Born: 1400
- Died: 1484 (aged 83–84)
- Occupation: Diplomat
- Parent: Guillaume Cousinot le Chancelier

Guillaume Cousinot de Montreuil (1400–1484) was a French diplomat, magistrate and civil servant. He served as France's diplomatic representative in England between 1444 and 1449, during a period of truce between the two countries. Apart from his diplomat occupation, he was also a poet and historian.

== Biography ==
Guillaume Cousinot de Montreuil was nicknamed Guillaume Cousinot II or Le Jeune (The young), due to his being the son of Guillaume Cousinot le Chancelier. This family link was long debated by historians. Until the 19th century, they were primarily thought of as an uncle and a nephew until the archivist Jules Doinel, based on historical documents, proved they were indeed father and son.

Guillaume was a student at the University of Orléans where he graduated as a Licencié ès lois; his father funded his education with the property he owned in Beauce, which was taken from the Burgundian Faction.

=== Career ===
Between 1418 and 1436, he fought for the Armagnac Faction.

He received the duty of Grand Maistre Gouverneur and judge of the mines and outbuildings, and then Chancellor and Chamberlain of the Kings Charles VII and Louis XI. Finally, he was appointed as Conseiller et Maître des requêtes à l’Hôtel du Roi.

In 1438, he became the secretary of the king, and then Conseiller et Maître des requêtes à l’Hôtel du Roi. During that time, he was also named commissioner of the king and was charged with the administration and finance. In 1442, he became the first president of the Conseil delphinal, who would soon become the Parliament of the Dauphiné due to his function as an advisor of the prince Louis, who would become Louis XI. Between 1444 and 1449, he was appointed as diplomat and sent in an embassy to England during a truce between the two countries. He was made knight during the siege of Rouen, and subsequently made Bailiff of the city from 1449 to 1461.

In 1451, he was made ambassador to the Scottish Court, but became shipwrecked on English coasts, and was captured and kept captive for 3 years. He was ransomed by Charles VII by a ransom of 20,000 écus levied from a salt tax on Normandy.

He became lord of Montreuil from 1456 until his death. On his seal, a lady holds in one hand a heater shield, and in the other a helm.

In 1459, Cousinot de Montreuil represented the king at the Council of Mantua in Italy and became his ambassador in Rome.

In 1461, Charles VII died, and his son, Louis XI, succeeded him. Louis XI put Guillaume Cousinot de Montreuil in jail, before changing his mind and making him his chamberlain.

He is named concierge of the Conciergerie, and also made captain of Cabrières in Languedoc, following the Treaty of Bayonne. He obtained the titles of Lord of Lattes-lès-Montpellier, captain of Sauxes (Salses), near Perpignan and governor and bailiff of Montpellier.

In 1464 he is cited as one of the king's advisors and knights. He stayed loyal to his king during the War of the Public Weal in 1465, and for this, Louis XI rewarded him with an increase in his pension ranging from 600 to 3000 francs.

In 1467 he started writing a medieval historical chronicle, the Chronique de la Pucelle. The chronicle is introduced by parts of the chronicle written by his father, the "Geste des Nobles" and then tells the life of Joan of Arc . However, the historian Craig Taylor states that Cousinot is not the author of this chronicle, attributing to him a polemic treatise defending the Valois monarchy against its English counterpart, titled *Pour ce que Plusieurs (La Loy Salique)*, probably written in 1465 in the context of the meetings between Louis XI and Edward IV.

In 1469 he wrote a poetic text, in verse and in prose, Réponse à Robertet sur le départ de la belle Étiennette.

In 1470 he was made ambassador to Rome.

In 1483, after the death of Louis XI, Guillaume, despite being extremely old, he became advisor of the new king, Charles VIII of France. In 1484, he attended the Estates General in Tours and died the same year.
