= Chronique de la Pucelle =

Chronicle of the Hundred Years' War

The Chronique de la Pucelle or Chronique de Cousinot was written by Guillaume Cousinot (1400–1484), Seigneur de Montreuil. The chronicle tells the history of Joan of Arc and the Hundred Years' War.

Guillaume Cousinot the younger was the son of Guillaume Cousinot (died c. 1442), who was chancellor to Louis I, Duke of Orléans. He was born half-way through the Hundred Year's War and was a contemporary of Joan of Arc. He acted as a diplomat and represented the French king in England and Italy.

A few years after the end of the war, he started to write the chronicle. The full title Chronique De La Pucelle; Ou, Chronique De Cousinot, Suivie De La Chronique Normande De P. Cochon, Relatives Aux Règnes De Charles VI Et De Charles VII can be translated as Chronicle of the Maid; Or, Chronicle of Cousinot, followed by the Norman chronicle of P. Cochon, relating to the reigns of Charles VI and Charles VII. The work incorporates the "Geste des Nobles" which was written by his father.

The Chronique de la Pucelle was first published in 1661, as an anonymous work, by the historian and archivist Denis Godefroy (1615–1681). Its 19th-century editor, Vallet de Viriville, kept the original title.
