= Bourgon =

- Commune
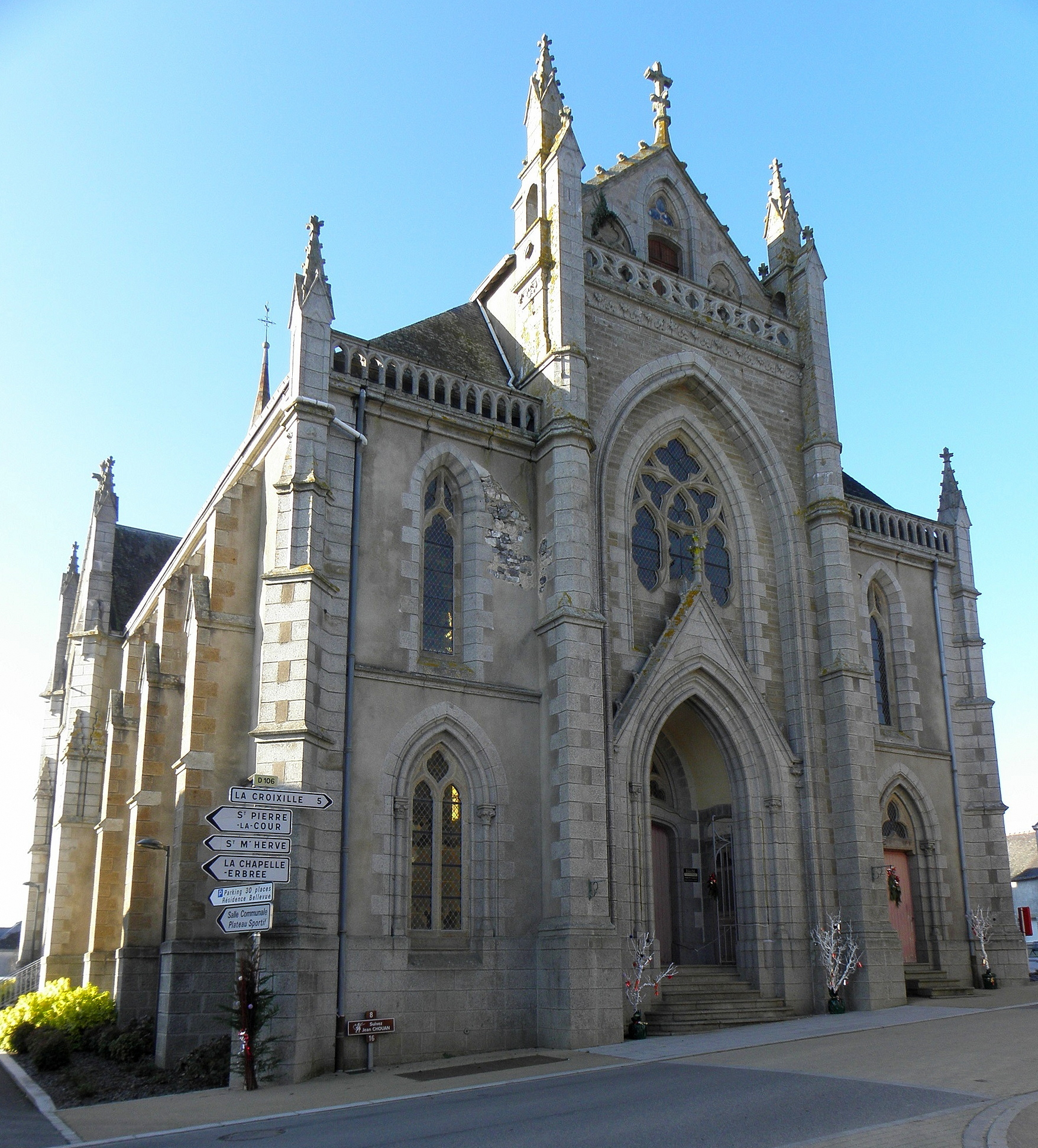
- The church of Saint-Pierre, in Bourgon
- Location of Bourgon
- Location within France Location within Pays de la Loire
- Coordinates: 48°10′04″N 1°03′55″W
- Country: France
- Region: Pays de la Loire
- Department: Mayenne
- Arrondissement: Laval
- Canton: Loiron-Ruillé
- Intercommunality: Laval Agglomération

Government
  - Mayor (2020–2026): Damien Richard
- Area^{1}: 20.97 km^{2} (8.10 sq mi)
- Elevation: 116 m (381 ft)
- Highest elevation: 188 m (617 ft)
- Lowest elevation: 88 m (289 ft)
- Population (2023): 616
  - Density: 29.4/km^{2} (76.1/sq mi)
- Time zone: UTC+01:00 (CET)
  - Summer (DST): UTC+02:00 (CEST)
- INSEE/Postal code: 53040 /53410
- ^{1} French Land Register data, which excludes lakes, ponds, glaciers > 1 km^{2} (0.386 sq mi or 247 acres) and river estuaries.

Bourgon (French pronunciation: [buʁɡɔ̃]) is a commune in the Mayenne department in northwestern France.

== Population ==
Historical population
Year	Pop.	±% p.a.
1968	722	—
1975	670	−1.06%
1982	625	−0.99%
1990	582	−0.89%
1999	587	+0.10%
2007	611	+0.50%
2012	634	+0.74%
2017	640	+0.19%
2023	616	−0.63%
Source: INSEE

== See also ==
- Communes of Mayenne
