= Vaudémont (disambiguation) =

Vaudémont is a commune in France. Vaudémont may also refer to:

== People ==
- Elisabeth of Lorraine-Vaudémont (c. 1395–1456), German regent and translator
- Henri of Lorraine-Vaudémont (died 1505), French bishop
- Charles de Lorraine de Vaudémont (1561–1587), French Roman Catholic cardinal
- Antoine, Count of Vaudémont (c. 1400–1458), French nobleman
- Frederick I, Count of Vaudémont (1369–1415), French nobleman
- Frederick II, Count of Vaudémont (c. 1428–1470), French nobleman
- Louis, Count of Vaudémont (1500–1528), French nobleman
- Charles Thomas, Prince of Vaudémont (1670–1704), Austrian army commander
- Joseph Louis, Prince of Lorraine-Vaudémont (1759–1812), Austrian general

== Other uses ==
- Count of Vaudémont, French noble title
- Château de Vaudémont, castle in France
- Place Vaudémont, square in France
