= House of Lorraine =

Royal house of Europe

House of Lorraine Haus Lothringen
- Frankish imperial house
- Original arms of the House of Lorraine
- Parent house: Ardennes–Metz which in turn can possibly be a cadet branch of either the Etichonids or the Matfridings
- Country: Alsace, Austria, Bohemia, Brabant, France, Flanders, Hungary, Lorraine, Luxembourg, Mexico, Modena and Tuscany
- Founded: 1047
- Current head: Karl von Habsburg-Lorraine
- Titles: Holy Roman Emperor; Emperor of Austria; Emperor of Mexico; King of the Romans; King of Bohemia; King of Croatia; King of Hungary; Archduke of Austria; Grand Duke of Tuscany; Duke of Milan; Duke of Brabant; Duke of Lorraine; Duke of Guise; Duke of Alsace; Duke of Bar; Duke of Luxembourg; Duke of Modena; Count of Flanders; (see more)
- Deposition: Lorraine: 1738 – Francis I ceded title in accordance with the Treaty of Vienna, gaining Tuscany Holy Roman Empire, Luxembourg, Brabant, and Flanders: 1805 – Francis II & I ceded titles in accordance with the Peace of Pressburg Parma: 1847 – Marie Louise died with issue Tuscany: 1859 – Leopold II abdicated due to pressure from Italian nationalists Mexico: 1867 – Maximilian I executed by Liberal republicans. Austria, Hungary and Bohemia: 1918 – Charles I & IV relinquished participation in state affairs following the end of World War I
- Cadet branches: Vaudémont; Guise (extinct); Habsburg-Lorraine; Habsburg-Este; Habsburg-Tuscany; Hohenberg (non-dynastic)

The House of Lorraine (German: Haus Lothringen) was a noble house that ruled over the Duchy of Lorraine (1047–1431, 1473–1737) within the Holy Roman Empire, and also held other feudal domains, such as the County of Vaudémont, the Duchy of Bar, the Duchy of Guise, and various minor possessions. The cadet branch, headed by the Counts of Vaudémont, continued and reacquired the Duchy of Lorraine in 1473, thus establishing the junior ducal line, that ruled over Lorraine until 1737. Its cadet branch, the House of Guise, had a prominent position in political affairs of the Kingdom of France. In 1047, Adalbert, became Duke of Lorraine after his relative, the ruler of Verdun (of the House of Ardenne–Verdun) died. The House of Lorraine is a child house of the House of Ardenne, same as the House of Verdun.

By the marriage of duke Francis of Lorraine to Maria Theresa of Austria in 1736, and with the success in the ensuing War of the Austrian Succession (1740–1748), the House of Lorraine was joined to the House of Habsburg and became known as the House of Habsburg-Lorraine (German: Haus Habsburg-Lothringen). Francis, his sons Joseph II and Leopold II, and his grandson Francis II were the last four Holy Roman emperors from 1745 until the dissolution of the empire in 1806. The House of Habsburg-Lorraine inherited the Habsburg Empire, ruling the Austrian Empire and then Austria-Hungary until the dissolution of the monarchy in 1918.

Although its senior agnates are the dukes of Hohenberg, as of 2003, the house is headed by Karl von Habsburg (born 1961), grandson of the last emperor Charles I.

== Ancestry ==
Lineage of the House of Lorraine is certain since the 11th century, but due to the fragmentary nature of historical sources, reliable tracing of its older ancestry proved to be challenging within genealogical studies, particularly in light of various dynastic claims (direct or indirect connections with the Carolingians; common ancestry with the Habsburgs) posed by the junior ducal line during the early modern period.

=== A controversial origin ===
The main two theories of the House's origin are:

- the theory of Etichonid ancestry, which claims that Adalbert of Metz and his brother Gerard were descendants of the Nordgau branch of the Etichonid Dynasty, the same branch from which the House of Habsburg and the House of Zähringen could possibly descend;
- the theory of Gerardide ancestry, which claims that Adalbert and Gerard descended from the Matfridings which are thought to have been a branch of the Gerardides.

What is better documented is that in 1048 Emperor Henry III gave the Duchy of Upper Lorraine first to Adalbert of Metz and then to his brother Gerard, whose successors (collectively known as the House of Alsace or the House of Châtenois) retained the duchy until the death of Charles the Bold in 1431.

==== Certainties ====
Based on documents dating from the 11th century, researchers are able to establish the two generations preceding Gerard of Alsace. The oldest certain generation is a sibling group shown at the top of the family chart below composed of Gerard, Adalbert and Adelaide:

Gerard, Count, probably of Metz, died between 1021 and 1033, married Eve, daughter of Count Sigefroid, ancestor of the Counts of Luxembourg. From this marriage were born two children: Sigfried, died between 1017 and 1020, and Berscinde, abbess of Remiremont;

Adelaide married Henry of Franconia, Count in Wormsgau, and is the mother of Emperor Conrad II the Salic and several other children;

Adalbert was Count of Metz, died in 1037. A donation dated June 12, 1037 in favor of the Abbey of Saint-Mathieu calls him dux and marchio Lotoringie. He married Judith who gave birth to a single son, named Gérard.

Gérard, son of Adalbert, died in 1045. He is called Count of Alsace in a charter of May 1038 where he puts an end to a dispute against the Abbey of Remiremont. He married a Gisèle, who gave birth to Adalbert, Duke of Lorraine in 1047, Gérard, Count of Metz, then Duke of Lorraine in 1047, Conrad, Adalberon, Beatrix, Odelric, Cuno, Oda, abbess of Remiremont from 1048 to 1071, Azelinus, Ida and Adelheid, as stated in the Notitiæ Fundationis Monasterii Bosonis-Villæ (Notice of the founding of the monastery of Bouzonville).

Earliest Certain Ancestors

Eva	Gérard count of Metz († 1021/1033)	Adelinde x Henry of Speyer count of Speyer (Wormsgau)	Adalbert count of Metz († 1033)	Judith
Siegfried († 1017)	Bercinda abbess of Remiremont	Conrad II, Holy Roman Emperor emperor (990 † 1039)	Gérard count († 1045)	Gisèle
Adalbert duke of Lorraine (1047-1048)	Gérard of Alsace duke of Lorraine (1048-1070)	Conrad, Adalberon, Beatrix, Odelric, Cuno	Oda abbesse de Remiremont (1048-1071)	Azelinus, Ida, Adelheid

==== Etichonid ====
The Etichonid origin was unanimously recognized from the 18th until the 20th century. For this reason, the marriage between Maria Theresa of Austria and Francis of Lorraine was seen at the time as the reunion of the two branches of the dynasty. The main proponents of this theory have been: Dom Calmet (1672 † 1757), Nicolas Viton de Saint-Allais (1773 † 1842) and more recently Michel Dugast Rouillé (1919 † 1987) and Henry Bogdan.

Etichonid origin

Etichon-Adalric duke of Alsace († 690)	Berswinde
Adalbert duke of Alsace († 722)	Etichon II count of Nordgau († 720)
Luitfrid 1st duke of Alsace († 767)	Albéric 1st count of Nordgau († 735 ou 760)
Luitfrid II count of Sundgau († 802)	Eberhard 1st count of Nordgau († 800)
Hugues 1st count of Tours & Sundgau († 837)	Albéric II count of Nordgau († 816)
Luitfrid III count of Sundgau († 864)	Eberhard II count of Nordgau († 864)
Hugues II count of Sundgau († 880)	Luitfrid IV count of Sundgau († 910)	Eberhard III count of Nordgau († 920)
Luitfrid V count of Sundgau († 925)	Hugh 1st count of Nordgau († 940)
Eberhard IV count of Nordgau († 972)	Guntram the Rich
Hugues II count of Nordgau († 984)	Adalbert count of Metz († 1038)	House of Habsburg (see Habsburg Family Tree)
counts of Nordgau (Etichonid)	Gérard count of Alsace († 1047)
Adalbert duke of Lorraine (1047-1048)	Gérard d'Alsace duke of Lorraine (1048-1070)

==== Gerardide-Matfriding ====
The main proponents of the Gerardide-Matfriding theory are: Eduard Hlawitschka, George Poull and partially the Europäische Stammtafeln (which however does not take into account the kinship with the Girardides).

The question of the origin of the House of Lorraine was taken up in the 20th Century by Eduard Hlawitschk. He established that Gérard d'Alsace came from the Counts of Metz, but grouped these counts into two family groups: the Matfried of the 9th Century, and the Adalbert/Gérard of the 10th century. The absence of documentation does not allow a formal kinship to be established between the two groups. But he notes that this kinship is very probable because they are of similar status, use the same onomastic background and have concluded matrimonial alliances in the same circles (House of Ardennes, imperial families, etc.).

Eduard Hlawitschka continues his proposal by estimating that the Matfrieds could even be descended from the Gerardide (family of Gérard/Girard, Leuthard, Alard/Adal(h)ard, Beggo/Bégon/Bérenger), counts of Paris at the end of the 8th century and the beginning of the 9th century. His thesis was taken up by the historian George Poull and partially by the Europäische Stammtafeln (which however do not take into account the kinship with the Girardides). Eduard Hlawitschka's thesis, with the Girardide connection, is the one that currently meets with the most support, while the Etichonide thesis seems to be receding (for the agnateic/male lineage, of course; in the cognatic/female lineage, there are obviously relationships, at least with the Eguisheim-Nordgau).

Counts of Metz and ancestors of the Dukes of Lorraine.

Adalhard of Metz; Count of Metz
Henry the Fowler; King of Germany	Oda	Gerhard; Count of Metz	Richer/Richar (d.945); Abbot of Prüm, Bishop of Liège	Matfried; Count of Metz
"Ottonian dynasty"	Wigfried; Archbishop of Cologne	Godfrid; Count Palantine of Lotharingia	Adalbert (d.944); Count of Metz	Bishop Bernoin of Verdun
Godfrid; Duke of Lower Lotharingia	Gebhard; Possibly father of...	Gerhard, Count of Metz; Possibly father of...	Adalhard; Possibly father of...
Count Sigfried founder of Luxembourg	Richard? Count of Metz? Possibly father of...
Henry II, Holy Roman Emperor	Cunigunde of Luxembourg	Eva of Luxembourg	Gerhard Mosellensis; Count of Metz	Adalbert; Count in Saargau	Adelaide of Metz
Sigfried died young	Berscinda abbess	Gerhard; Count of Metz	Conrad II, Holy Roman Emperor
Adalbert, Duke of Lorraine	"Salian dynasty"

==== Renaissance & Modern ====
The Renaissance dukes of Lorraine tended to arrogate to themselves claims to Carolingian ancestry, as illustrated by Alexandre Dumas in the novel La Dame de Monsoreau (1846); in fact, as seen above, the only evidence is of some interraltionships with the Carolingians, and some intermarriages with the Saxon Emperors and the Salian Emperors, but not so much as to give them any claims to the Imperial Crown, much less the Crown of France.

This did not stop the Bourbons in the Treaty of Montmartre in 1662 naming the non-Capetian House of Lorraine based on this supposed ancestry as next in line to the French throne after the Bourbons, in preference to the Capetian House of Courtenay, who would have been next by the Salic Law. Based on the terms of the accord, Louis XIV was given control of the Duchy of Lorraine, and Charles IV's family would become princes in the French royal family. However, it failed to take hold and Charles IV publicly repudiated it.

The house of Vaudémont continued to rule the independent duchies of Lorraine and Bar. However, Louis XIV's imperialist ambitions (which involved the occupation of Lorraine in 1669–97) forced the dukes into a permanent alliance with his archenemies, the Holy Roman Emperors from the House of Habsburg.

The final status of the duchy was only determined as part of the settlement of the War of Austrian Succession. As part of that, Francis Stephen, now Holy Roman Emperor and husband of Maria Theresa of Austria, Queen of Bohemia and Hungary, surrendered the Duchy of Lorraine to France, to be ruled by the former King of Poland, Stanisław Leszczyński, the father in law of Louis XV of France, during his lifetime, and then to be inherited by France. Francis Stephen and his heirs received the Grand Duchy of Tuscany, and all his wife's Habsburg lands (House of Habsburg-Lorraine).

== Senior ducal line ==
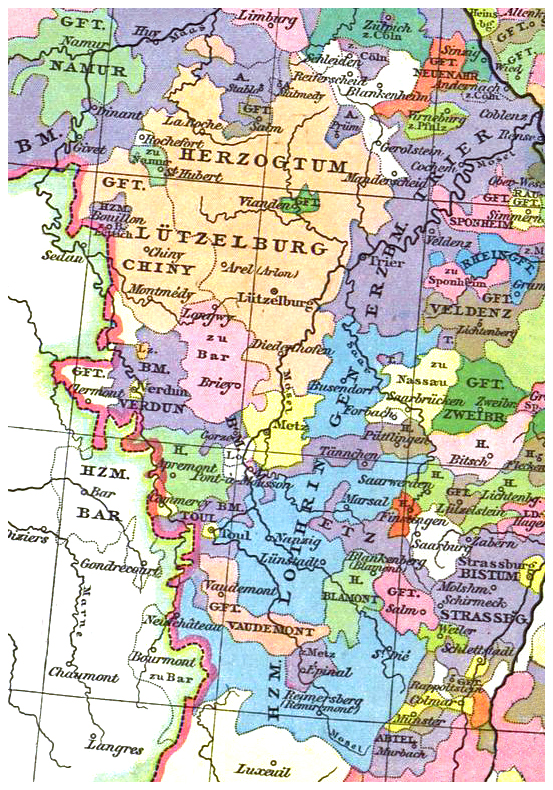
Duchy of Lorraine (blue) in the middle of the 14th century

The senior ducal line of the House emerged upon acquiring the Duchy of Upper Lorraine in the middle of the 11th century. As a loyal subject of the emperor Henry III, count Adalbert of Metz was appointed as Duke of Upper Lorraine in 1047, but died already in 1048. His brother Gerard (d. 1070) was appointed to succeed him as the new duke, and was in turn succeeded by his direct male descendants, who ruled over the Duchy up to 1431. During that period, the Duchy was one of the most prominent states of the Holy Roman Empire. In 1431, the duke Charles II died without sons or brothers. His closest male relative was Antoine, Count of Vaudémont, from the cadet branch of the House, but the Duchy of Lorraine passed to Charles' daughter Isabella, and her husband René I from the House of Valois-Anjou, thus initiating a Vaudémont-Angevine conflict over Lorraine that lasted for years.

== Junior ducal line ==
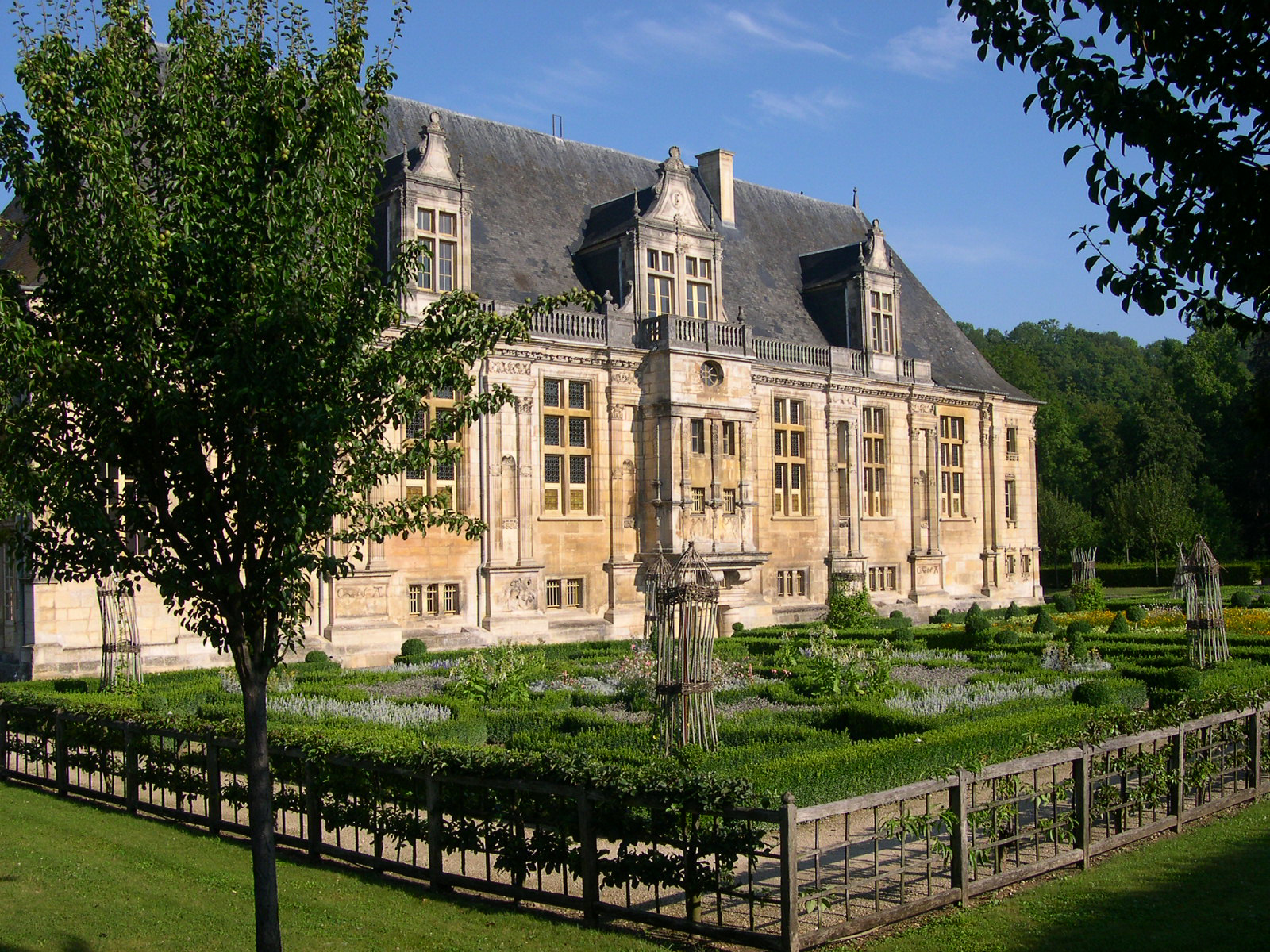
The Château du Grand Jardin in Joinville, the seat of the Counts and Dukes of Guise.

Since the extinction of the senior ducal line in 1431, the cadet branch of the House, headed by Counts of Vaudémont, took over the family claims and aspirations, engaging in a series of disputes and conflicts with the Angevins over the possession of Lorraine. Those disputes were resolved in 1445, when count Frederick II of Vaudémont married Yolande, daughter of Isabella and René, thus establishing a close connection with the Angevine dukes of Lorraine. In 1470, Yolande's brother, duke John II of Lorraine died and was succeeded by his son Nicholas I, who died already in 1473, without male heirs. Thus, Yolande's and Frederick's son, count René of Vaudémont claimed the Duchy of Lorraine and succeeded in reacquiring it for the family, thus establishing the junior ducal line of the House, and later also adding to his titles that of the Duke of Bar (a domain within the French realm).

During the entire period of their rule in Lorraine (1473–1737), dukes from the junior line were facing constant challenges from both the imperial authority, and the neighboring Kingdom of France, thus leading to a series of political and territorial disputes, conflicts, and arrangements with both sides. In 1542, the Treaty of Nuremberg was reached with the Emperor, securing a high degree of autonomy for the Duchy.

In the same time, the French Wars of Religion saw the rise of a cadet branch of the Lorraine ducal family, the House of Guise, which became a dominant force in French politics and, during the later years of Henry III's reign, was on the verge of succeeding to the throne of France. Mary of Guise, mother of Mary, Queen of Scots, also came from this family. Under the Bourbon monarchy the remaining branch of the House of Guise, headed by the duc d'Elbeuf, remained part of the highest ranks of French aristocracy.

== House of Habsburg‑Lorraine ==
The coat of arms of the House of Habsburg-Lorraine. The shield displays the marshaled arms of the Habsburg, Babenberg and Lorraine families.

After Emperor Joseph I and Emperor Charles VI failed to produce a son and heir, the Pragmatic Sanction of 1713 left the throne to the latter's yet unborn daughter, Maria Theresa. In 1736 Emperor Charles arranged her marriage to Francis of Lorraine who agreed to exchange his hereditary lands for the Grand Duchy of Tuscany (as well as the Duchy of Teschen from the Emperor).

At Charles's death in 1740 the Habsburg holdings passed to Maria Theresa and Francis, who was later elected (in 1745) Holy Roman Emperor as Francis I. The Habsburg-Lorraine nuptials and dynastic union precipitated, and survived, the War of the Austrian Succession. Francis and Maria Theresa's daughters Marie Antoinette and Maria Carolina of Austria became Queens of France and Naples-Sicily, respectively, while their sons Joseph II and Leopold II succeeded to the imperial title.

Apart from the core Habsburg dominions, including the triple crowns of Austria, Hungary and Bohemia, several junior branches of the House of Habsburg-Lorraine reigned in the Italian duchies of Tuscany (until 1737–1796, 1814–1860), Parma (1814–1847) and Modena (1814–1859). Another member of the house, Archduke Maximilian of Austria, was Emperor of Mexico (1863–67).

In 1900, Archduke Franz Ferdinand of Austria (then heir presumptive to the Austro-Hungarian throne) contracted a morganatic marriage with Countess Sophie Chotek. Their descendants, known as the House of Hohenberg, have been excluded from succession to the Austro-Hungarian crown, but not that of Lorraine, where morganatic marriage has never been outlawed. Nevertheless, Otto von Habsburg, the eldest grandson of Franz Ferdinand's younger brother, was universally regarded as the head of the house until his death in 2011. It was at Nancy, the former capital of the House of Vaudémont, that the former crown prince married Princess Regina of Saxe-Meiningen in 1951.

== List of heads ==
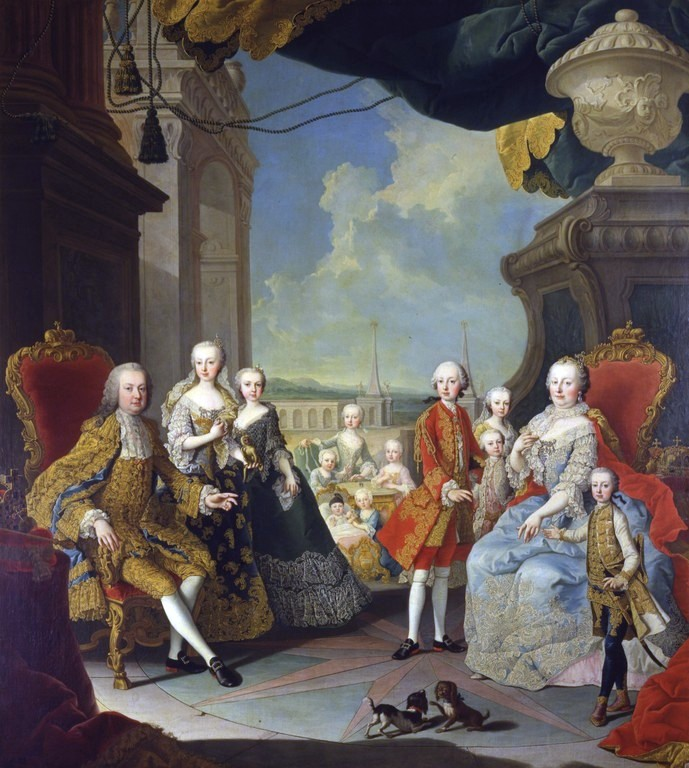
Francis I of Lorraine with his family.

The following is a list of ruling heads (after 1918 pretenders) of the House of Lorraine, and its successor House of Habsburg-Lorraine, from the start of securely documented genealogical history in the 11th century.

=== Heads of the senior ducal line ===
- Adalbert, Duke of Upper Lorraine r. 1047/8
- Gérard, Duke of Lorraine, r. 1048–1070
- Theodoric (Thierry) II r. 1070–1115
- Simon I, r. 1115–1138
- Matthias I, r. 1138–1176
- Simon II, r. 1176–1215
- Frederick I, r. 1205/6
- Frederick II, r. 1206–1213
- Theobald I, r. 1213–1220
- Matthias II, r. 1220–1251
- Frederick III, c. 1251–1303
- Theobald II, r. 1303–1312
- Frederick IV, r. 1312–1328
- Rudolph, r. 1328–1346 (killed in the Battle of Crécy)
- John I, r. 1346–1390
- Charles II, r. 1390–1431

Charles II died without male heir, the duchy passing to Isabella, Duchess of Lorraine, consort of Naples by marriage to Duke René of Anjou. The duchy passed to their son John II (r. 1453–1470), whose son Nicholas I (r. 1470–1473) died without heir. The title now went to Nicholas' aunt (sister of John II) Yolande.

=== Heads of the junior ducal line ===
The junior ducal line of the House of Lorraine was formed by Yolande's marriage to Frederick II, Count of Vaudémont (1428–1470), a member of the cadet (Vaudémont) branch of the senior ducal line, who was descended from John I (Yolande's great-grandfather) via his younger son Frederick I, Count of Vaudémont (1346–1390), Antoine, Count of Vaudémont (c. 1395–1431) and Frederick II, Count of Vaudémont (1417–1470). René inherited the title of Duke of Lorraine upon his marriage in 1473.

- René II, Duke of Lorraine, r. 1473–1508
- Antoine, r. 1508–1544
- Francis I, r. 1544/5
- Charles III, r. 1545–1608 (his mother Christina of Denmark served as his regent during his minority)
- Henry II (I), r. 1608–1624 (leaving no sons, both of his daughters became Duchesses of Lorraine by marriage)
  - Nicole (m. Charles IV)
  - Claude (m. Nicholas II)
- Francis II, (son of Charles III, duke for six days in 1625, abdicated in favour of his son)
- Charles IV, Duke of Lorraine r. 1624–1675 (briefly abdicated in favour of his brother in 1634)
  - Nicholas Francis (Nicholas II) (briefly made duke during the French invasion of Lorraine in 1634)
- Charles V, r. 1675–1690 (son of Nicholas Francis)
- Leopold, r. 1690–1729
- Francis (III) Stephen, Duke of Lorraine, r. 1728–1737, Holy Roman Emperor (as Francis I) r. 1745–1765

=== Heads of the Habsburg–Lorraine line ===
- Joseph II, Holy Roman Emperor (1741–1790), r. 1765–1790
- Leopold II, Holy Roman Emperor (1747–1792), r. 1790–1792
- Francis II (IV) (1768–1835), Holy Roman Emperor 1792–1806, Emperor of Austria 1804–1835
- Ferdinand I (V), Emperor of Austria (1793–1875), r. 1835–1848 (abdicated in 1848, succeeded by his nephew)
- Franz Joseph I of Austria (1830–1916), r. 1848–1916, son of Archduke Franz Karl of Austria (1802–1878), a younger son of Francis II

The heir of Franz Joseph, Rudolf, Crown Prince of Austria, committed suicide in 1889. Franz Joseph was succeeded by his grandnephew, Charles I, son of Archduke Otto Francis, the son of Archduke Karl Ludwig, a younger brother of Franz Joseph.

- Blessed Charles of Austria (Charles I and IV) (1887–1922), r. 1916–1919 (dissolution of the monarchy)
- Otto von Habsburg (1912–2011)
- Karl von Habsburg (b. 1961)
  - Heir apparent: Ferdinand Zvonimir von Habsburg (b. 1997)

== Family tree ==
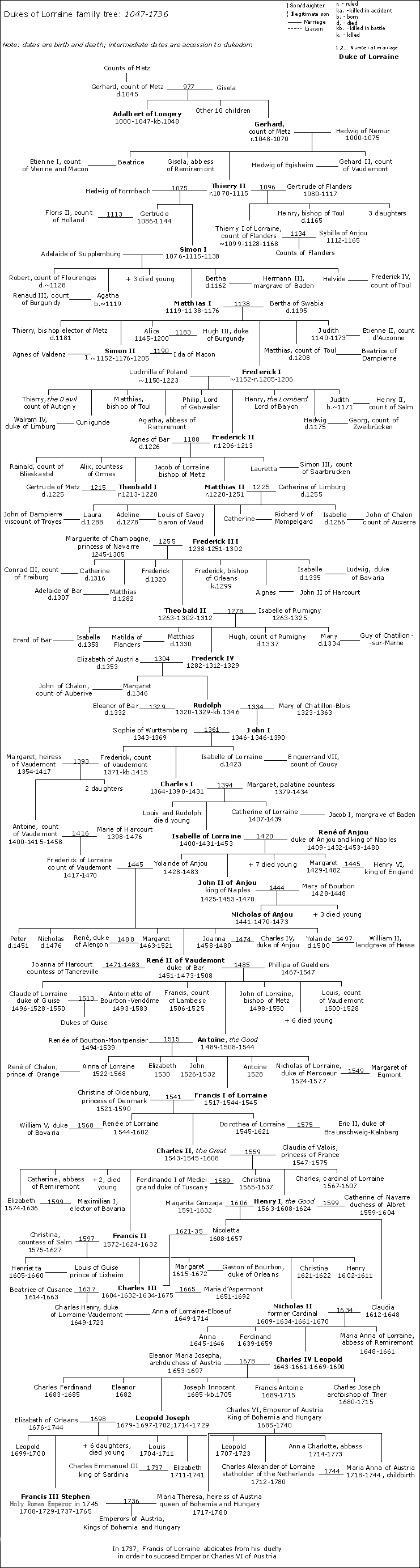

=== Table Version ===
Genealogy of the House of Lorraine

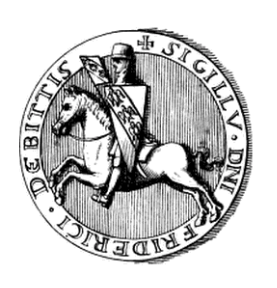
**Gerard the Wonderful** (c. 1030 – 14 April 1070); Count of Metz, 1047 to 1048; Duke of (Upper)Lorraine, 1048–1070 succeeding his brother Adalbert	1st use arms of Lorraine on a Seal by Frederick I
Gebhard of Supplinburg	Hedwig of Formbach	**Theodoric II the Valiant** (d. 30 Dec 1115); Duke of (Upper)Lorraine, 1070	Gertrude of Flanders, d. of Robert I, Count of Flanders	Gerard (1057- c. 1108); Count of Vaudémont, c. 1070	**Vaudemont Branch**
Lothair III, Holy Roman Emperor, 1133 (1075 – 1137)	**Simon I** (1076 - 1139); Duke of Lorraine,1115	Diedrik/Thierry (1099 – 1168); Count of Flanders,1128	Henry I (died 1165), Bishop of Toul	Hugh I (d. 1155); Count of Vaudémont, 1118	Ulric, count of Dagsbourg and Eguisheim
Matthias/Matthew I (c. 1119 - 1176); Duke of Lorraine, 1138	Robert, lord of Floranges	Philip I (1143 – 1191); Count of Flanders, 1168	Margaret I (c. 1145 – 1194); Countess of Flanders,1191 m. Baldwin V, Count of Hainaut of the orig. House of Flanders	Gerard II (d. 1188); Count of Vaudémont, 1155	Ulric († 1166), seigneur de Deuilly	Eudes (d. 1197), Bishop of Toul
Simon II (1140 – 1207); Duke of Lorraine,1176–1205(abd.)	Frederick I (c. 1143 – 1206); C. of Bitche; Duke of Lorraine,1205–1206	Matthias (died 1208) count of Toul	Theoderic (died 1181) bishop of Metz, (1174–1179)	**Counts of Flanders**	Hugh II (d. 1242); Count of Vaudémont, 1188-1242	Geoffroy/Theodoric d. > 1248 seigneur de Deuilly and Clefmont, ~1189 - 1239	Gérard († 1219) bishop of Metz
**Frederick II** (c. 1165 – c. 1213); Duke of Lorraine, 1206	Henry the Lombard, who built the castle of Bayon	Philip (died 1243), lord of Gerbéviller	Matthias (1170–1217), bishop of Toul	Theodoric the Devil, lord of Autigny, m. Gertrude , d. of Matthieu II of Montmorency le Grand, Constable of F.	* Hugh III († 1244),Count of Vaudémont,1242-1243	Theodric/Geoffroy, seigneur de Gondrecourt	Gérard
Theobald I (b. c. 1191, d. 17 February 1220); Duke of Lorraine,1213	Matthias II (b. c. 1193, d. 9 February 1251); Duke of Lorraine, 1220	Renaut, Count of Castres	Jacques, Bishop of Metz	**Lords of Chatelet**	Henry I ( 1232 - 1278); Count of Vaudémont, 1243
**Frederick III** (1240 – 1303); Duke of Lorraine, 1251	Henry II († 1299); Count of Vaudémont, 1279	Jacques († 1299), seigneur de Blainville et de Bettingen	Gui († 1299), chanoine à Toul
**Theobald/Thiébaud II** (1263 – 1312); Duke of Lorraine, 1303	Matthias (d. 1282), lord of Beauregard	Frederick (died 1299), bishop of Orléans (1297–1299)	Frederick (died c. 1320), lord of Plombiéres, Romont, and Brémoncourt	Henry III (~1275 – 1348); Count of Vaudémont, 1299
**Frederick IV the Fighter** (1282 - 1329); Duke of Lorraine, 1312	Matthias (died c. 1330), lord of Darney, Boves, Blainville, and Florennes, married Mathilde of Flanders.	Hugh (d. after 20 March 1337), his successor in Rumigny, Martigny, and Aubenton.	Henry IV († 1346 Crecy) heir Count of Vaudémont	Marguerite († 1333) m. 1323 Anseau, sire de Joinville (1265 † 1343)
**Rudolph the Valiant** (1320 – 1346 Battle of Crécy); Duke of Lorraine, 1328	Frederick, c. of Lunèville	Theobald	Albert	Henry V ( 1327 -1365); Count of Vaudémont, 1348
**John I** (1346 – 1390)Duke of Lorraine, 1346
**Charles II** (1365–1431); Duke of Lorraine, 1390	Frederick I (1369–1415 Agincourt); Count of Vaudémont, 1393	Margaret of Joinville (1354–1418); Countess of Vaudémont, 1365
3rd House of Anjou	**Isabella** (1400 – 1453) suo jure Duchess of Lorraine, 1431	René the Good (1409 – 1480); Duke of Anjou, Count of Provence,1434-1480; King of Naples, 1435-1442	Anthony (c. 1400 – 1458); Count of Vaudémont, 1418	**Lorraine-Vaudémont**
**John II** (1424 – 1470); Duke of Lorraine, 1453; Duke of Calabria, 1435, titular, 1442	Louis (1427 – 1444), Marquis of Pont-à-Mousson and Lieutenant General of Lorraine	Nicholas, (1428 – 1430), twin with Yolande, Duke of Bar	Margaret (1430 – 1482) married King Henry VI of England, by whom she had a son, Edward of Westminster, Prince of Wales	Yolande (2 November 1428 – 23 March 1483)	Frederick/Ferry II (c. 1428 – 31 August 1470); Count of Vaudémont, 1458	John of Lorraine-Vaudémont (d. 1473), Count of Harcourt and Aumale, & Baron of Elbeuf.	Henri of Lorraine-Vaudémont (d. 1505), B. of Thérouanne (1447–1484), & B. of Metz (1484–1505)
**Nicholas II** (1448 – 1473); Duke of Lorraine, 1470; Duke of Calabria, titular, 1470	**René II** (1451 – 1508; Count of Vaudémont, 1470; Duke of Lorraine, 1473; Duke of Bar, 1483
**House of Lorraine**	**Antoine II the Good** (1489–1544); Duke of Lorraine, 1508	House of Guise	Claude (1496–1550) count, 1508, & first Duke of Guise, 1528	Jean, Cardinal of Lorraine and Bishop of Metz (1498–1550)	Louis, Count of Vaudémont (1500–1528)	François, Count of Lambesc (1506–1525)
**Francis I** (1517–1545); Duke of Lorraine & Bar, 1544	Nicholas (1524–1577); Count of Vaudémont, 1548; Prince, 1563 & Duke of Mercœur, 1569	Mary of Guise (1515–1560); m. 2. King James V of Scotland, mother of **Mary, Queen of Scots**	François (1519– murd. 1563); Duke of Guise, 1550	Charles (1524–1574), D. of Chevreuse, A. of Reims, and Cardinal of Lorraine.	Louis I, Cardinal of Guise (1527–1578)	Claude, Duke of Aumale (1526–1573)	François de Lorraine, Grand Prior (18 April 1534, Joinville – 6 March 1563)	René, Marquis of Elbeuf (1536–1566)
**Charles III the Great** (1543 – 1608); Duke of Lorraine & Bar, 1545	Philippe Emmanuel of Lorraine, Duke of Mercœur (1558–1602).	Charles de Lorraine (1561 – 1587), Cardinal de Vaudémont, Bishop of Toul and of Verdun	Henri (1570 – 1600), Marquis of Mouy and Count of Chaligny	Henri (1550–murd.1588); Duke of Guise, 1563	Charles (1554–1611); Duke of Mayenne, 1573	Louis II, Cardinal of Guise (1555–murd.1588), Archbishop of Reims	Dukes of Aumale, ext. 1761	Lords, Marquesses and Dukes of Elbeuf, ext. 1763; C. of Harcourt-Armagnac, ext. 1747
Henry II of Lorraine (1563–1624); Duke of Lorraine & Bar, 1608	Charles (1567–1607), Cardinal of Lorraine and Bishop of Metz (1578–1607), Bishop of Strasbourg (1604–1607)	Francis II of Lorraine (1572–1632); Duke of Lorraine & Bar, 1624	Counts of of Chaligny, ext. 1672	Dukes of Guise, Chevreuse, Joyeuse, ext. 1675	Dukes of Mayenne, ext. 1621
**Nicole** (1608 – 1657); Duchess of Lorraine & Bar, 1624-25 consort Duchess of Lorraine, 1625-34	Claude-Françoise (1612 - 1648); Duchess Consort of Lorraine	**Charles IV** (1604 – 1675); Duke of Lorraine & Bar, 1625-34, 1661-75	**Nicholas Francis** (1609 – 1670); Duke of Lorraine & Bar, 1634-1634, (French Occupation 1634-61)
Charles Henri de Lorraine (1649–1723); Prince of Vaudémont and of Commercy; Spanish General	Ferdinand Philippe, Hereditary Prince of Lorraine, jure matris Duke of Bar (1639 – 1659)	**Charles V Léopold** (1643 – 1690); Duke of Lorraine & Bar, 1675–1690, (French Occupation 1670 - 1697); Generalfeldmarschall of Austrian Army reconquerer of Hungary
Charles Thomas, Prince of Vaudémont (1670 – 1704); Generalfeldmarschall of Austrian Army	Leopold (1679–1729); Duke of Lorraine & Bar, 1690–1729	Charles Joseph (1680–1715); Prince-Bishop of Olomouc	Joseph Emanuel (1685 – 1705)	François Antoine (1689 – 1715)
Léopold (1699 - 1700), first crown prince	Louis (1704 - 1711), second crown prince	Léopold Clement Charles (25 April 1707 - 4 June 1723), third crown prince	**Francis Stephen** (1708 - 1765); Duke of Lorraine & Bar, 1729-37; Grand Duke of Tuscany, 1737; Holy Roman Emperor, 1745	Maria Theresa of Austria; Queen of Bohemia and Hungary, Archduchess of Austria	Maria Anna (1718 – 1744) s. of Maria Theresa, gov. of the Austrian Netherlands	Charles Alexander Emmanuel (1712 - 1780), governor of the Austrian Netherlands and Austrian army commander.
**House of Habsburg-Lorraine**; Holy Roman Emperors, Archduke of Austria, King of Bohemia, King of Hungary, Emperor of Austria

=== Male-line family tree ===
List of male-line members of the House of Lorraine

Male, male-line, legitimate, non-morganatic members of the house who either lived to adulthood, or who held a title as a child, are included. Heads of the house are in bold.

- Gerard, Duke of Lorraine, 1030–1070
  - Theodoric II, Duke of Lorraine, d. 1115
    - Simon I, Duke of Lorraine, 1076–1139
      - Matthias I, Duke of Lorraine, 1119–1176
        - Simon II, Duke of Lorraine, 1140–1207
        - Frederick I, Duke of Lorraine, 1143–1206
          - Frederick II, Duke of Lorraine, 1165–1213
            - Theobald I, Duke of Lorraine, 1191–1220
            - Matthias II, Duke of Lorraine, 1193–1251
              - Frederick III, Duke of Lorraine, 1240–1302
                - Theobald II, Duke of Lorraine, 1263–1312
                  - Frederick IV, Duke of Lorraine, 1282–1326
                    - Rudolph, Duke of Lorraine, 1320–1346
                      - John I, Duke of Lorraine, 1346–1390
                        - Charles II, Duke of Lorraine, 1365–1431
                        - Frederick I, Count of Vaudémont, 1369–1415
                          - Anthony, Count of Vaudémont, 1400–1458
                            - Frederick II, Count of Vaudémont, 1428–1470
                              - René II, Duke of Lorraine, 1451–1508
                                - Anthony, Duke of Lorraine, 1489–1544
                                  - Francis I, Duke of Lorraine, 1517–1545
                                    - Charles III, Duke of Lorraine, 1543–1608
                                      - Henry II, Duke of Lorraine, 1563–1624
                                      - Charles of Lorraine (bishop of Metz and Strasbourg), 1567–1607
                                      - Francis II, Duke of Lorraine, 1572–1632
                                        - Charles IV, Duke of Lorraine, 1604–1675
                                          - Charles Henry, Prince of Commercy, 1649-1723
                                            - Charles Thomas, Prince of Vaudémont, 1670-1704
                                        - Nicholas Francis, Duke of Lorraine, 1609–1670
                                          - Ferdinand Philip, Hereditary Prince of Lorraine, 1639–1659
                                          - Charles V, Duke of Lorraine, 1643–1690
                                            - Leopold, Duke of Lorraine, 1679–1729
                                              - Leopold Clement, Hereditary Prince of Lorraine, 1707–1723
                                              - Francis I, Holy Roman Emperor, 1708–1765
                                                - Joseph II, Holy Roman Emperor, 1741–1790
                                                - Archduke Charles Joseph of Austria, 1745–1761
                                                - Leopold II, Holy Roman Emperor, 1747–1792
                                                  - Francis II, Holy Roman Emperor, 1768–1835
                                                    - Ferdinand I of Austria, 1793–1875
                                                    - Archduke Francis Charles of Austria, 1802–1878
                                                      - Francis Joseph I of Austria, 1830–1916
                                                        - Rudolph, Crown Prince of Austria, 1858–1889
                                                      - Maximilian I of Mexico, 1832–1867
                                                      - Archduke Charles Louis of Austria, 1833–1896
                                                        - Archduke Francis Ferdinand of Austria, 1863–1914
                                                        - Archduke Otto of Austria, 1865–1906
                                                          - Charles I of Austria, 1887–1922
                                                            - Otto von Habsburg, 1912–2011
                                                              - Charles von Habsburg, b. 1961
                                                                - Ferdinand Habsburg, b. 1997
                                                              - George von Habsburg, b. 1964
                                                                - Charles Constantine Habsburg, b. 2004
                                                            - Robert, Archduke of Austria-Este, 1915–1996
                                                              - Prince Laurence of Belgium, b. 1955
                                                                - Prince Amadeus of Belgium, b. 1986
                                                                  - Archduke Maximilian of Austria-Este, b. 2019
                                                                - Prince Joachim of Belgium, b. 1991
                                                              - Archduke Gerard of Austria, b. 1957
                                                              - Archduke Martin of Austria, b. 1959
                                                                - Archduke Bartholomew of Austria, b. 2006
                                                                - Archduke Emmanuel of Austria, b. 2008
                                                                - Archduke Luigi of Austria, b. 2011
                                                            - Archduke Felix of Austria, 1916–2011
                                                              - Archduke Charles Philip of Austria, b. 1954
                                                                - Julian-Laurence Habsburg, b. 1994
                                                                - Louis-Damian Habsburg, b. 1998
                                                              - Archduke Raymond of Austria, 1958–2008
                                                                - 1 son
                                                              - Archduke Stephen of Austria, b. 1961
                                                                - 2 sons
                                                            - Archduke Charles Louis of Austria, 1918–2007
                                                              - Archduke Rudolph of Austria, b. 1950
                                                                - Archduke Charles Christian of Austria, b. 1977
                                                                - Archduke John of Austria, b. 1981
                                                                - Archduke Thomas of Austria, b. 1983
                                                                - Archduke Francis-Louis of Austria, b. 1988
                                                                - Archduke Michael of Austria, b. 1990
                                                                - Archduke Joseph of Austria, b. 1991
                                                              - Archduke Charles Christian of Austria, b. 1954
                                                                - Archduke Imre of Austria, b. 1985
                                                                  - Archduke Charles of Austria, b. 2023
                                                                - Archduke Christopher of Austria, b. 1988
                                                                  - Archduke Joseph of Austria, b. 2020
                                                                - Archduke Alexander of Austria, b. 1990
                                                            - Archduke Rudolph of Austria, 1919–2010
                                                              - Archduke Charles of Austria, b. 1955
                                                                - 2 children
                                                              - Simeon of Austria, b. 1958
                                                                - John Habsburg, b. 1997
                                                                - Louis Habsburg, b. 1998
                                                                - Philip Habsburg, b. 2007
                                                          - Archduke Maximilian of Austria, 1895–1952
                                                            - Ferdinand, 1918–2004
                                                              - Maximilian, b. 1961
                                                            - Henry, 1925–2014
                                                              - Philip, b. 1961
                                                              - Ferdinand Charles, b. 1965
                                                              - Conrad, b. 1971
                                                        - Archduke Ferdinand Charles of Austria, 1868–1915
                                                      - Archduke Louis Victor of Austria, 1842–1919
                                                  - Ferdinand III, Grand Duke of Tuscany, 1769–1824
                                                    - Leopold II, Grand Duke of Tuscany, 1797–1870
                                                      - Ferdinand IV, Grand Duke of Tuscany, 1835–1908
                                                        - Archduke Leopold Ferdinand of Austria, 1868–1935
                                                        - Archduke Joseph Ferdinand of Austria, 1872–1942
                                                          - Maximilian Habsburg, 1932–2024
                                                        - Archduke Peter Ferdinand of Austria, 1874–1948
                                                          - Archduke Godfrey of Austria, 1902–1984
                                                            - Archduke Leopold of Austria, b. 1942
                                                              - 2 sons
                                                          - Archduke George of Austria, 1905–1952
                                                            - Archduke Radbot, b. 1938
                                                              - Archduke Leopold, b. 1973
                                                                - Archduke Felix, b. 2007
                                                                - Archduke George, b. 2009
                                                              - Archduke Maximilian, b. 1976
                                                            - Archduke George, b. 1952
                                                        - Archduke Henry Ferdinand, 1878–1969
                                                      - Archduke Charles Salvator of Austria, 1839–1892
                                                        - Archduke Leopold Salvator of Austria, 1863–1931
                                                          - Archduke Rainer of Austria, 1895–1930
                                                          - Archduke Leopold of Austria, Prince of Tuscany, 1897–1958
                                                          - Archduke Anthony of Austria, 1901–1987
                                                            - Archduke Stephen of Austria, Prince of Tuscany, 1932–1998
                                                            - Archduke Dominic of Austria, b. 1937
                                                              - Alexander Habsburg, b. 1965
                                                                - Constantine Habsburg, b. 2000
                                                              - Gregory Habsburg, b. 1968
                                                          - Archduke Francis Joseph of Austria, Prince of Tuscany, 1905–1975
                                                          - Archduke Karl Pius of Austria, Prince of Tuscany, 1909–1953
                                                        - Archduke Francis Salvator of Austria, 1866–1939
                                                          - Archduke Francis Charles Salvator of Austria, 1893–1918
                                                          - Archduke Hubert Salvator of Austria, 1894–1971
                                                            - Archduke Frederick Salvator of Austria, 1927–1999
                                                              - Archduke Leopold Salvator of Austria, b. 1956
                                                              - Archduke Alexander Salvator of Austria, b. 1959
                                                                - Archduke Constantine of Austria, b. 2002
                                                                - Archduke Paul Salvator of Austria, b. 2003
                                                            - Archduke Andrew Salvator of Austria, b. 1936
                                                              - Archduke Thaddaeus Salvator of Austria, b. 2001
                                                              - Archduke Casimir Salvator of Austria, b. 2003
                                                            - Archduke Mark of Austria, b. 1946
                                                            - Archduke John Maximilian of Austria, b. 1947
                                                            - Archduke Michael Salvator of Austria, b. 1949
                                                          - Theodore Salvator, 1899–1978
                                                            - issue
                                                          - Clement Salvator, 1904–1974
                                                            - issue
                                                        - Archduke Albert Salvator, 1871–1896
                                                      - Archduke Louis Salvator of Austria, 1847–1915
                                                      - Archduke John Salvator of Austria, 1852–1890
                                                  - Archduke Charles, Duke of Teschen, 1771–1847
                                                    - Archduke Albert, Duke of Teschen, 1817–1895
                                                    - Archduke Charles Ferdinand of Austria, 1818–1874
                                                      - Archduke Frederick, Duke of Teschen, 1856–1936
                                                        - Archduke Albert Francis, Duke of Teschen, 1897–1955
                                                      - Archduke Charles Stephen of Austria, 1860–1933
                                                        - Archduke Charles Albert of Austria, 1888–1951
                                                        - Archduke Leo Charles of Austria, 1893–1939
                                                        - Archduke William of Austria, 1895–1948
                                                      - Archduke Eugene of Austria, 1863–1954
                                                    - Archduke Frederick of Austria, 1821–1847
                                                    - Archduke William Francis of Austria, 1827–1894
                                                  - Archduke Alexander Leopold of Austria, 1772–1795
                                                  - Archduke Joseph of Austria (Palatine of Hungary), 1776–1847
                                                    - Archduke Stephen of Austria (Palatine of Hungary), 1817–1867
                                                    - Archduke Joseph Charles of Austria, 1833–1905
                                                      - Archduke Joseph Augustus of Austria, 1872–1962
                                                        - Archduke Joseph Francis of Austria, 1895–1957
                                                          - Archduke Joseph Arpad of Austria, 1933–2017
                                                            - Archduke Joseph Charles of Austria, b. 1960
                                                              - 2 sons
                                                            - Archduke Andrew-Augustine of Austria, b. 1965
                                                              - 6 children
                                                            - Archduke Nicholas Francis of Austria, b. 1973
                                                              - 4 children
                                                            - Archduke John James of Austria, b. 1975
                                                              - 3 sons
                                                          - Archduke Stephen Dominic of Austria, 1934–2011
                                                          - Archduke Geza of Austria, b. 1940
                                                          - Archduke Michael of Austria, b. 1942
                                                            - Archduke Edward of Austria, b. 1967
                                                        - Archduke Ladislaus Luitpold, 1901–1946
                                                      - Archduke Ladislaus Philip of Austria, 1875–1895
                                                  - Archduke Anthony Victor of Austria, 1779–1835
                                                  - Archduke John of Austria, 1782–1859
                                                  - Archduke Rainer Joseph of Austria, 1783–1853
                                                    - Archduke Leopold Louis of Austria, 1823–1898
                                                    - Archduke Ernest of Austria, 1824–1899
                                                    - Archduke Sigismund of Austria, 1826–1891
                                                    - Archduke Rainer Ferdinand of Austria, 1827–1913
                                                    - Archduke Henry Anthony of Austria, 1828–1891
                                                  - Archduke Louis of Austria, 1784–1864
                                                  - Archduke Rudolph of Austria, 1788–1831
                                                - Ferdinand Charles, Archduke of Austria-Este, 1754–1806
                                                  - Francis IV, Duke of Modena, 1779–1846
                                                    - Francis V, Duke of Modena, 1819–1875
                                                    - Archduke Ferdinand Charles Victor of Austria-Este, 1821–1849
                                                  - Archduke Ferdinand Charles Joseph of Austria-Este, 1781–1850
                                                  - Archduke Maximilian of Austria-Este, 1782–1863
                                                  - Archduke Charles Ambrose of Austria-Este, 1785–1809
                                                - Archduke Maximilian Francis of Austria, 1756–1801
                                              - Prince Charles Alexander of Lorraine, 1712–1780
                                            - Charles Joseph of Lorraine, 1680–1715
                                            - Joseph Emmanuel, 1685–1705
                                            - Francis Anthony, 1689–1715
                                  - Nicholas, Duke of Mercœur, 1524–1577
                                    - Philip Emmanuel, Duke of Mercœur, 1558–1602
                                    - Cardinal Charles de Lorraine de Vaudémont, 1561–1587
                                    - Francis of Lorraine, Marquis of Chaussin, 1567–1596
                                    - Henry, Count of Chaligny, 1570–1600
                                      - Prince Charles of Lorraine, Bishop of Verdun, 1592–1631
                                      - Prince Henry of Lorraine, Count of Chaligny, 1596–1672
                                      - Prince Francis of Lorraine, Bishop of Verdun, 1599–1671
                                    - Eric of Lorraine, Count of Vaudémont, 1576–1623
                                - Claude, Duke of Guise, 1496–1550, founder of the **House of Guise**
                                  - Francis, Duke of Guise, 1519–1563
                                    - Henry I, Duke of Guise, 1550–1588
                                      - Charles, Duke of Guise, 1571–1640
                                        - Francis, Prince of Joinville, 1612–1639
                                        - Henry II, Duke of Guise, 1614–1664
                                        - Charles Louis, Duke of Joyeuse, 1618–1637
                                        - Louis, Duke of Joyeuse, 1622–1654
                                          - Louis Joseph, Duke of Guise, 1650–1671
                                            - Francis Joseph, Duke of Guise, 1670–1675
                                        - Roger, a knight, 1624–1653
                                      - Louis III, Cardinal of Guise, 1575–1621
                                      - Claude, Duke of Chevreuse, 1578–1657
                                      - Francis Alexander, a knight, 1589–1614
                                    - Charles, Duke of Mayenne, 1554–1611
                                      - Henry of Lorraine, Duke of Mayenne, 1578–1621
                                      - Charles Emmanuel of Lorraine, Count of Sommerive, 1581–1609
                                    - Louis II of Lorraine, Cardinal of Guise, 1555–1588
                                  - Charles, Cardinal of Lorraine, 1524–1574
                                  - Claude, Duke of Aumale, 1526–1573
                                    - Charles, Duke of Aumale, 1555–1631
                                    - Claude of Lorraine, knight of Aumale, 1564–1591
                                  - Louis I of Lorraine, Cardinal of Guise, 1527–1578
                                  - Francis of Lorraine, Grand Prior, 1534–1563
                                  - René II of Lorraine, Marquis of Elbeuf, 1536–1566
                                    - Charles I, Duke of Elbeuf, 1556–1605
                                      - Charles II, Duke of Elbeuf, 1596–1657
                                        - Charles III, Duke of Elbeuf, 1620–1692
                                          - Charles of Lorraine, knight of Elboeuf, 1650–1690
                                          - Henry, Duke of Elbeuf, 1661–1748
                                            - Philip of Lorraine, Prince of Elbeuf, 1678–1705
                                            - Charles of Lorraine, 1685–1705
                                          - Louis of Lorraine, Abbot of Orcamp, 1662–1693
                                          - Emmanuel Maurice, Duke of Elbeuf, 1677–1763
                                        - Henry, Abbot of Hombieres, 1622–1648
                                        - Francis Louis, Count of Harcourt, 1623–1694
                                          - Alphonse Henri, Count of Harcourt, 1648–1718
                                            - Francis-Mary of Lorraine, Count of Maubec, 1686–1706
                                            - Francis of Lorraine, Prince of Montlaur, 1684–1705
                                          - Cesar of Lorraine, Prince of Montlaur, 1650–1675
                                          - Charles of Lorraine, Abbé of Harcourt, 1661–1683
                                        - Francis-Mary, Prince of Lillebonne, 1624–1694
                                          - Charles, Prince of Commercy, 1661–1702
                                          - John Paul of Lorraine, 1672–1693
                                      - Henry, Count of Harcourt, 1601–1666
                                        - Louis, Count of Armagnac, 1641–1718
                                          - Henry, Count of Brionne, 1661–1713
                                            - Louis, Prince of Lambesc, 1692–1743
                                              - Louis, Prince of Brionne, 1725–1761
                                                - Charles Eugene, Prince of Lambesc, 1751–1825
                                                - Joseph Louis, Prince of Lorraine-Vaudémont, 1759–1812
                                          - Francis Armand of Lorraine, Abbot of Royaumont, 1665–1728
                                          - Camille of Lorraine, Count of Chamilly, 1666–1715
                                          - Louis Alphonse of Lorraine, bailiff of Armagnac, 1675–1704
                                          - Charles of Lorraine, Count of Armagnac, 1684–1751
                                        - Philip, Knight of Lorraine, 1643–1702
                                        - Alphonse Louis of Lorraine, Abbot of Royaumont, 1644–1689
                                        - Raymond Berenger of Lorraine, Abbot of Faron de Meaux, 1647–1686
                                        - Charles, Count of Marsan, 1648–1708
                                          - Charles Louis, Count of Marsan, 1696–1755
                                            - Gaston, Count of Marsan, 1721–1743
                                            - Camille, Prince of Marsan, 1725–1780
                                          - James Henry of Lorraine, Knight of Lorraine, 1698–1734
                                - John, Cardinal of Lorraine, 1498–1550
                                - Louis, Count of Vaudémont, 1500–1528
                                - Francis of Lorraine, Lord of Lambesc, 1506–1525
                              - Nicholas, Lord of Joinville and Bauffremont, d. c. 1476
                            - Henry of Lorraine-Vaudémont, Bishop of Metz, c. 1432–1505
                            - John, Count of Harcourt, d. 1473
                          - Frederick, Lord of Rumigny
                          - Charles, Lord of Bovines
                          - John, Lord of Fleurines
                  - Matthias, Lord of Darney, Boves, Blainville and Florennes, d. c. 1330
                  - Hugh, Lord of Rumigny, Martigny, and Aubenton, d. after 1337
                - Matthias, Lord of Beauregard, d. 1282
                - Frederick, Bishop of Orléans, d. 1299
                - Frederick, Lord of Plombiéres, Romont, and Brémoncourt, d. c. 1320
                - Gerard, fl. 1317
            - James, Bishop of Metz
            - Reynold, Count of Castres
          - Theoderic the Devil, Lord of Autigny
          - Henry the Lombard
          - Philip, Lord of Gerbéviller, d. 1243
          - Matthias, Bishop of Toul, 1170–1217
        - Theoderic, bishop of Metz, d. 1181
        - Matthias, Count of Toul, d. 1208
      - Robert, lord of Floranges
      - Baldwin
      - John
  - Gerard, Count of Vaudémont, 1057–1108

== Armorial ==
The below shows the main coats of arms of the House of Lorraine.

=== Chiefs of the Family ===
Figure
Prince et blasonnement
Duke of Lorraine from Simon II (v.1140-1207) à Charles II (1364–1431). The blason was:

d'or à la bande de gueules chargée de trois alérions d'argent.

The Counts of Vaudémont from Antoine (1400–1458) à Ferry II (1428–1470) originally used a blue label: Blasonnement : d'or à la bande de gueules chargée de trois alérions d'argent (Lorraine) (see below)

However, when Charles II dies without male heirs they removed the blue label as senior male agnates of the house of Lorraine.

It was originally three eaglets whose legs and trunk gradually atrophied to become the current alerion at the end of the 15th century. It is elsewhere from this century that this heraldic term dates.

René II (1451–1508) - Arms quartered those of his parents, utilized 1473 to 1500.

Blasonnement : écartelé, en 1 et 4 d'or à la bande de gueules chargée de trois alérions d'argent (Lorraine) et en 2 et 4 coupé, le chef tiercé en pal d'un fascé de gueules et d'argent de huit pièces (Hongrie), d'azur semé de fleurs de lis d'or et au lambel de gueules (Anjou-Sicile) et d'argent à la croix potencée d'or cantonnée de quatre croisettes du même (Jérusalem) et en pointe parti d'azur semé de fleurs de lis d'or à la bordure de gueules (Anjou) et d'azur semé de croisettes recroisetées au pied fiché d'or et à deux bars adossés du même (Bar).

Duke of Lorraine de René II (1451–1508), arms after 1500, and of Antoine the Good (1489–1544), until 1538.

Blasonnement : coupé le chef parti de trois traits, en 1 fascé de gueules et d'argent de huit pièces (Hongrie), en 2 d'azur semé de fleurs de lis d'or et au lambel de gueules (Anjou-Sicile), en 3 d'argent à la croix potencée d'or cantonnée de quatre croisettes du même (Jérusalem) et en 4 d'or à quatre pals de gueules (Aragon) et la pointe parti d'azur semé de fleurs de lis d'or à la bordure de gueules (Anjou) et d'azur semé de croisettes recroisetées au pied fiché d'or et à deux bars adossés du même (Bar), sur-le-tout d'or à la bande de gueules chargée de trois alérions d'argent (Lorraine).

Duke of Lorraine of Antoine (1489–1544), after 1538, and François III (1708–1765), in 1737. The bottom 2 quarters are inherited from Philip of Guelders (1467–1544), Lorraine's claims to the duchies of Guelders and Juliers were limited to this heraldic addition.

Blasonnement : coupé d'un trait et parti de trois, en 1 fascé de gueules et d'argent de huit pièces (Hongrie), en 2 d'azur semé de fleurs de lis d'or et au lambel de gueules (Anjou-Sicile), en 3 d'argent à la croix potencée d'or cantonnée de quatre croisettes du même (Jérusalem), en 4 d'or à quatre pals de gueules (Aragon), en 5 d'azur semé de fleurs de lis d'or à la bordure de gueules (Anjou), en 6 d'azur au lion contourné à queue fourchée d’or, armé, lampassé et couronné de gueules (Gueldre), en 7 d'or au lion de sable armé et lampassé de gueules (Juliers) et en 8 d'azur semé de croisettes recroisetées au pied fiché d'or et à deux bars adossés du même (Bar), sur-le-tout d'or à la bande de gueules chargée de trois alérions d'argent (Lorraine)

Grand Duke of Tuscany Francis I Stephen (1708–1765), as part of the end of the War of Austrian Succession, the Duchy of Lorraine was exchanged for the Grand Duchy of Tuscany. For his and Maria Theresa of Austria's descendants see House of Habsburg-Lorraine and Armorial of the Habsburgs.

Blasonnement : coupé d'un trait et parti de trois, en 1 fascé de gueules et d'argent de huit pièces (Hongrie), en 2 d'azur semé de fleurs de lis d'or et au lambel de gueules (Anjou-Sicile), en 3 d'argent à la croix potencée d'or cantonnée de quatre croisettes du même (Jérusalem), en 4 d'or à quatre pals de gueules (Aragon), en 5 d'azur semé de fleurs de lis d'or à la bordure de gueules (Anjou), en 6 d'azur au lion contourné à queue fourchée d’or, armé, lampassé et couronné de gueules (Gueldre), en 7 d'or au lion de sable armé et lampassé de gueules (Juliers) et en 8 d'azur semé de croisettes recroisetées au pied fiché d'or et à deux bars adossés du même (Bar), sur-le-tout parti d'or à la bande de gueules chargée de trois alérions d'argent (Lorraine) et d'or à six tourteaux mis en orle, cinq de gueules et celui en chef d'azur chargé de trois fleurs de lis d'or (Toscane/Medici).

=== Branches cadettes ===
Figure
Prince et blasonnement
Counts of Vaudémont from XI^{e} centuryto 1348. From Gérard (v.1057-1108), younger son of Gérard d'Alsace (v.1030-1070). This line also founded the house of Joinville.

Blasonnement : burelé d'argent et de sable de dix pièces (Vaudémont).

Seigneurs de Deuilly du xii^{e} siècle à 1419. Issus de Geoffroy, fils cadet de Gérard II de Vaudémont. Cette lignée se fondit dans la maison du Châtelet.

Blasonnement : burelé d'or et de sable de dix pièces (Deuilly).

Counts of Flanders au xii^{e} siècle. Issue of Thierry, Count of Flanders (v1100-1168), 2nd son of Theodoric II, Duke of Lorraine, he inherited Flanders through is his mother Gertrude.his son Philip I, Count of Flanders (v.1143-1191) adopted the black lion on gold arms emblematic of Flanders. His line, through his daughter, merged into the original House of Flanders in the person of the Baldwin V, Count of Hainaut.

Blasonnement : d'or au lion de sable armé et lampassé de gueules (Flandre).

A partir de la seconde moitié du xiv^{e} siècle, on attribua rétrospectivement aux prédécesseurs de Philippe d'Alsace un écu gironné d'or et d'azur à l'écu de gueules brochant (Flandre ancien).

Count of Boulogne through Mathieu d'Alsace (v1137-1173), younger son of Thierry, Count of Flanders (v1100-1168). He married the heiress of the House of Blois which had inherited the county from the original House of Flanders which bred the original Kings of Jerusalem. Through his daughter Ide (v.1160-1216), the county passed to the house of Dammartin.

Blasonnement : d'or à trois tourteaux de gueules (Boulogne)

Seigneurs de Florange du xiie au xive siècle. Issue of Robert, younger son of Simon I, Duke of Lorraine (v.1076-1139). This line merged into the houses of Lenoncourt and Chambley.

Blasonnement : d'or au lion de sable armé et lampassé de gueules et à la bordure du même (Florange).

Counts of Toul in xiii^{e} century. Issue of Mathieu, younger son of Matthias I, Duke of Lorraine (v.1110-1176), who became Count of Toul through his wife Béatrice de Dampierre. In debt, his grandson Eudes sold the county in 1261.

Blasonnement : le sceau du comte Eudes montre un lion mais les émaux sont inconnus.

Seigneurs de Montreux en Ferrette from xiii^{e} to the xvi^{e} century. Issue of Robert, younger son of Ferry de Toul, who inherited the fief via his mother Agnès de Ferrette.

Blasonnement : d'or au lion de sable lampassé de gueules et à la bordure engrelée du même (Montreux).

counts of Vaudémont from 1393to 1473

d'or à la bande de gueules chargée de trois alérions d'argent, brisé d'un lambel d'azur.

dukes of Guise of the House of Guise(Lorraine)

coupé et parti en 3, au premier fascé de gueules et d'argent, au second d'azur semé de lys d'or et au lambel de gueules, au troisième d'argent à la croix potencée d'or, cantonnée de quatre croisettes du même, au quatrième d'or aux quatre pals de gueules au cinquième parti d'azur semé de lys d'or et à la bordure de gueules, au sixième d'azur au lion contourné d'or, armé, lampassé et couronné de gueules, au septième d'or au lion de sable armé et lampassé de gueules, au huitième d'azur semé de croisettes d'or et aux deux bar d'or. Sur le tout d'or à la bande de gueules chargé de trois alérions d'argent le tout brisé d'un lambel de gueules.

Claude II de Lorraine (1496–1550), Duke d'Aumale, Duke of Mayenne, and pair de France, seigneur de Saint-Dizier, chevalier de Saint-Michel

écartelé, en 1 et 4 coupé et parti en 3, au premier fascé de gueules et d'argent, au second d'azur semé de lys d'or et au lambel de gueules, au troisième d'argent à la croix potencée d'or, cantonnée de quatre croisettes du même, au quatrième d'or aux quatre pals de gueules au cinquième parti d'azur semé de lys d'or et à la bordure de gueules, au sixième d'azur au lion contourné d'or, armé, lampassé et couronné de gueules, au septième d'or au lion de sable armé et lampassé de gueules, au huitième d'azur semé de croisettes d'or et aux deux bar d'or. Sur le tout d'or à la bande de gueules chargé de trois alérions d'argent le tout brisé d'un lambel et d'une bordure de gueules; et en 2 et 4 d'azur aux trois fleurs de lys d'or et au bâton péri de gueules(Bourbon-Condé).

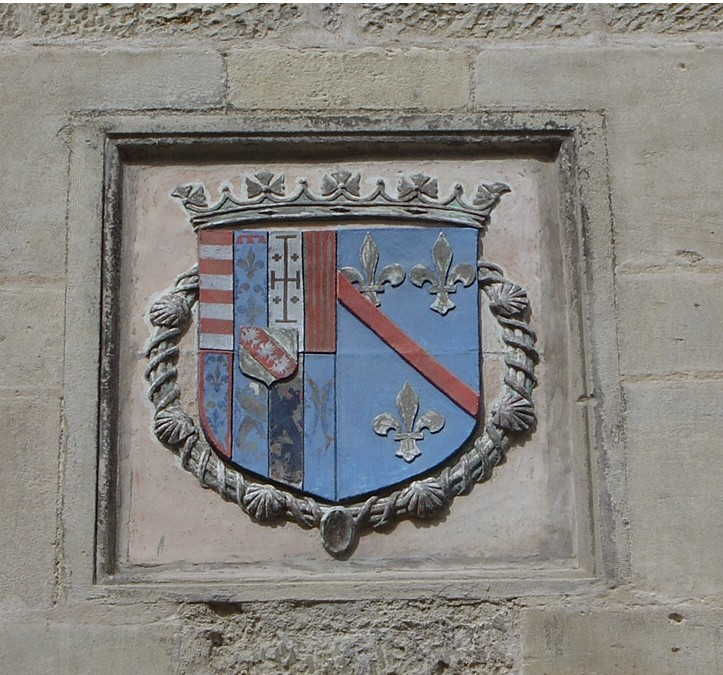

On the facade of the auditoire de Joinville : Accolé de Lorraine et Bourbon.

He was the son of Claude Ier de Lorraine, duc de Guise and Antoinette of Bourbon.

ducs de Mayenne

écartelé, en 1 et 4 : coupé et parti en 3, au premier fascé de gueules et d'argent, au second d'azur semé de lys d'or et au lambel de gueules, au troisième d'argent à la croix potencée d'or, cantonnée de quatre croisettes du même, au quatrième d'or aux quatre pals de gueules au cinquième parti d'azur semé de lys d'or et à la bourdure de gueules, au sixième d'azur au lion contourné d'or, armé, lampassé et couronné de gueules, au septième d'or au lion de sable armé et lampassé de gueules, au huitième d'azur semé de croisettes d'or et aux deux bar d'or. Sur le tout d'or à la bande de gueules chargé de trois alérions d'argent le tout brisé d'un lambel de gueules; en 2 et 3 contre-écartelé en 1 et 4 d'azur, à l'aigle d'argent, becquée, languée et couronnée d'or (Este, Dukes of Ferrara) et en 2 et 3 d'azur, à trois fleurs de lys d'or, à la bordure endentée de gueules et d'or.

Duke d'Aumale

écartelé, en 1 et 4 coupé et parti en 3, au premier fascé de gueules et d'argent, au second d'azur semé de lys d'or et au lambel de gueules, au troisième d'argent à la croix potencée d'or, cantonnée de quatre croisettes du même, au quatrième d'or aux quatre pals de gueules au cinquième parti d'azur semé de lys d'or et à la bourdure de gueules, au sixième d'azur au lion contourné d'or, armé, lampassé et couronné de gueules, au septième d'or au lion de sable armé et lampassé de gueules, au huitième d'azur semé de croisettes d'or et aux deux bar d'or. Sur le tout d'or à la bande de gueules chargé de trois alérions d'argent le tout brisé d'un lambel et d'une bordure de gueules; et en 2 et 4 d'azur aux trois fleurs de lys d'or et au baton péri de gueules(Bourbon-Condé).

marquis et ducs d'Elbeuf

coupé et parti en 3, au premier fascé de gueules et d'argent, au second d'azur semé de lys d'or et au lambel de gueules, au troisième d'argent à la croix potencée d'or, cantonnée de quatre croisettes du même, au quatrième d'or aux quatre pals de gueules au cinquième parti d'azur semé de lys d'or et à la bourdure de gueules, au sixième d'azur au lion contourné d'or, armé, lampassé et couronné de gueules, au septième d'or au lion de sable armé et lampassé de gueules, au huitième d'azur semé de croisettes d'or et aux deux bar d'or. Sur le tout d'or à la bande de gueules chargé de trois alérions d'argent le tout brisé d'un lambel de gueules et d'une bordure de gueules.

comtes d'Harcourt

coupé et parti en 3, au premier fascé de gueules et d'argent, au second d'azur semé de lys d'or et au lambel de gueules, au troisième d'argent à la croix potencée d'or, cantonnée de quatre croisettes du même, au quatrième d'or aux quatre pals de gueules au cinquième parti d'azur semé de lys d'or et à la bourdure de gueules, au sixième d'azur au lion contourné d'or, armé, lampassé et couronné de gueules, au septième d'or au lion de sable armé et lampassé de gueules, au huitième d'azur semé de croisettes d'or et aux deux bar d'or. Sur le tout d'or à la bande de gueules chargé de trois alérions d'argent le tout brisé d'un lambel de gueules et d'une bordure de gueules chargée de huit besans d'or.

ducs de Mercœur

coupé et parti en 3, au premier fascé de gueules et d'argent, au second d'azur semé de lys d'or et au lambel de gueules, au troisième d'argent à la croix potencée d'or, cantonnée de quatre croisettes du même, au quatrième d'or aux quatre pals de gueules au cinquième parti d'azur semé de lys d'or et à la bourdure de gueules, au sixième d'azur au lion contourné d'or, armé, lampassé et couronné de gueules, au septième d'or au lion de sable armé et lampassé de gueules, au huitième d'azur semé de croisettes d'or et aux deux bar d'or. Sur le tout d'or à la bande de gueules chargé de trois alérions d'argent le tout brisé d'un lambel d'azur.

Louise de Lorraine (1553 † 1601), fille de Nicolas, duc de Mercœur, mariée en 1575 à Henri III (1551 † 1589), roi de France

mi-parti de France, qui est d'azur aux trois fleurs de lys d'or et de Lorraine, qui est coupé et parti en 3, au premier fascé de gueules et d'argent, au second d'azur semé de lys d'or et au lambel de gueules, au troisième d'argent à la croix potencée d'or, cantonnée de quatre croisettes du même, au quatrième d'or aux quatre pals de gueules au cinquième parti d'azur semé de lys d'or et à la bourdure de gueules, au sixième d'azur au lion contourné d'or, armé, lampassé et couronné de gueules, au septième d'or au lion de sable armé et lampassé de gueules, au huitième d'azur semé de croisettes d'or et aux deux bar d'or. Sur le tout d'or à la bande de gueules chargé de trois alérions d'argent.

ducs de Chevreuse

Ecartelé : au I et au IV coupé et parti en 3, au premier fascé de gueules et d'argent, au second d'azur semé de lys d'or et au lambel de gueules, au troisième d'argent à la croix potencée d'or, cantonnée de quatre croisettes du même, au quatrième d'or aux quatre pals de gueules au cinquième parti d'azur semé de lys d'or et à la bourdure de gueules, au sixième d'azur au lion contourné d'or, armé, lampassé et couronné de gueules, au septième d'or au lion de sable armé et lampassé de gueules, au huitième d'azur semé de croisettes d'or et aux deux bar d'or. Sur le tout d'or à la bande de gueules chargé de trois alérions d'argent le tout brisé d'un lambel de gueules; au II et au III contre-écartelé 1 et 4, parti de gueules, à l'écusson d'argent, aux rais d'escarboucle d'or, brochantes sur le tout et d'or à la fasce échiquetée de gueules et d'argent de trois tires (Duchy of Cleves et 2 et 3 d'azur à trois fleurs de lys d'or à la bordure componée d'argent et de gueules (de la Marck).

— Royal house — House of Lorraine; House of Habsburg-Lorraine
Preceded by House of Habsburg
Preceded by House of Habsburg	Archduchy of Austria; 1780–1804	Archduchy elevated to the Empire of Austria
Preceded by House of Habsburg	Kingdom of Bohemia; 1780–1918	Kingdom abolished
Preceded by House of Habsburg	Duchy of Burgundy and the Burgundian Netherlands; 1780–1795	Duchy abolished
Preceded by House of Habsburg	Kingdom of Hungary; 1780–1849	Incorporated into the Empire of Austria Austro-Hungarian Compromise recreates the Kingdom of Hungary separate from the Empire of Austria in 1867
Preceded by House of Habsburg	Kingdom of Hungary; 1867–1918	Kingdom abolished
New title	Empire of Austria; 1804–1918	Empire abolished
Preceded by House of Medici	Grand Duchy of Tuscany; 1765–1801	Grand Duchy abolished Became the Kingdom of Etruria, a territory of the House of Bourbon
Preceded by House of Bonaparte	Kingdom of Lombardy–Venetia; 1815–1866	Kingdom abolished Italy united under the House of Savoy
Preceded by House of Bonaparte	Grand Duchy of Tuscany; 1814–1859	Grand duchy abolished Incorporated into the United Provinces of Central Italy
Preceded by House of Iturbide; Deposed in 1823; a republic was created in the interim	Empire of Mexico; 1864–1867	Empire abolished
