= Philip II of Nassau-Weilburg =

Philip II, Count of Nassau-Weilburg
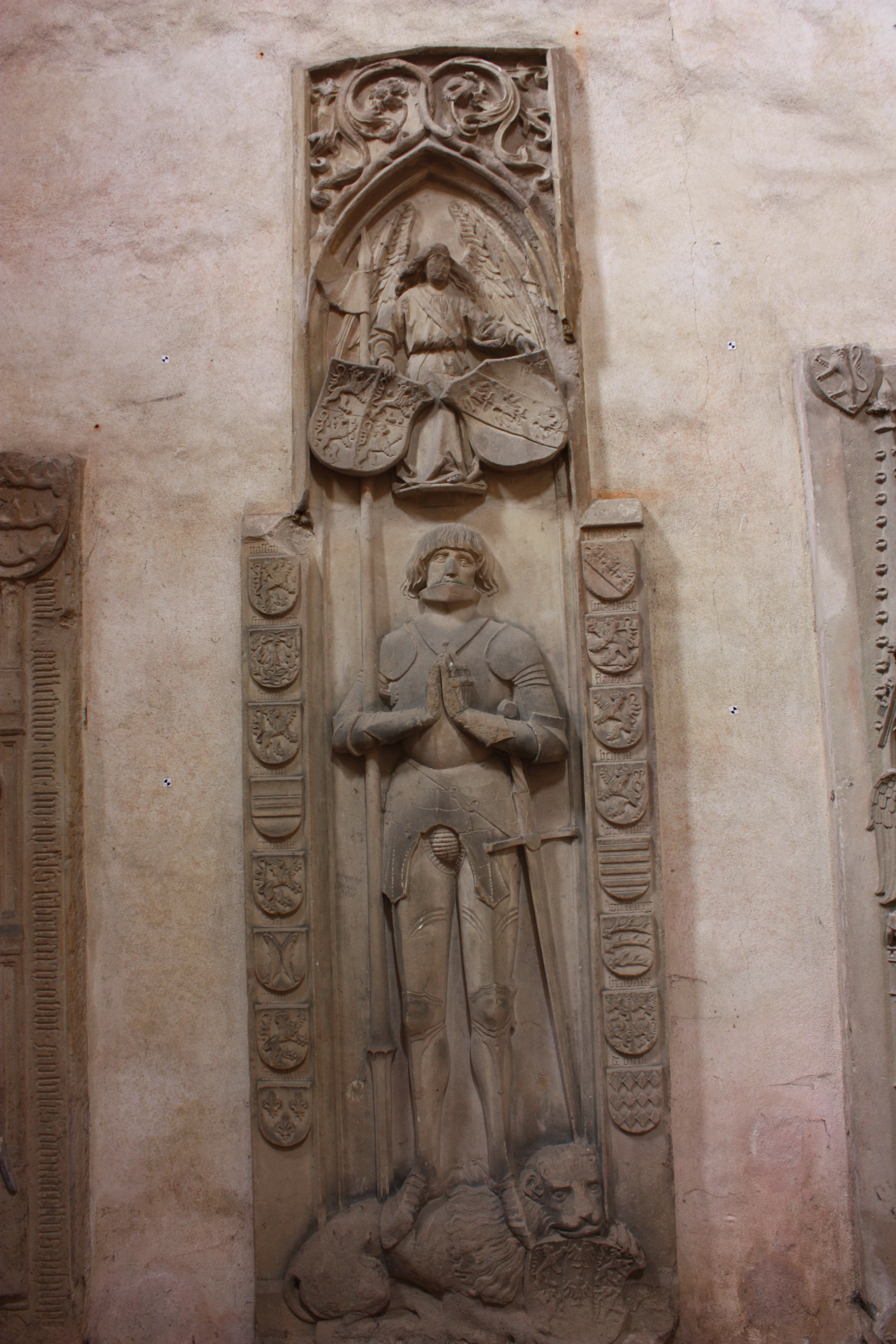
- Born: 14 March 1418
- Died: 19 March 1492 (aged 74); Mainz
- Noble family: House of Nassau
- Spouse: Margaret of Loon
- Issue: John III; Philip
- Father: Philipp I of Nassau-Weilburg
- Mother: Elisabeth of Lorraine-Vaudémont

Philip II, Count of Nassau-Weilburg (14 March 1418 – 19 March 1492 in Mainz) was Count of Nassau in Weilburg and shared briefly the regency of the County of Saarbrücken.

== Biography ==
Philip was a son of Philip I (1368 – 1429), and grandson of John I, Count of Nassau-Weilburg (1309 – 1371), with his second wife, Elisabeth of Lorraine-Vaudémont (c. 1395 – 1456).

In 1429, he succeeded his father as count of Nassau-Weilburg, jointly with his brother Johann II ("John"). Their mother was the regent until 1438, when Philip reached majority, but an arrangement was made to provide for their mother. In 1442, the brothers decide to divide the counties: Johann II received Saarbrücken with Seigneurie of Commercy Château bas (this Nassau-Saarbrücken line died out in 1574) and Philip II received Weilburg (this Nassau-Weilburg line died out in the male line in 1912; however, it was continued in the female line to this day). Ownership of the possessions in the Palatinate (Dannenfels, Stauf, Kirchhein, Altenbamberg, Wöllstein) would be shared between the two lines. Their sisters married lords and did not partake in the inheritance.

Philip II died on 19 March 1492, and was succeeded by his grandson, Louis I.

== Marriage and issue ==
Philip married Margaret of Loon-Heinsberg. She was a daughter of John III (d. bef. 1441), Count of Loon-Heinsberg, who in turn was the son of John II, Count of Loon.

Philip and Margaret had two sons:

- John III (1441–1480), succeeding his father as Count of Nassau-Weilburg after Philip II's death.
- Philip (1443–1471).

As a widower, he married Veronika of Sayn-Wittgenstein. This marriage was childless.

== Ancestry ==
Ancestors of Philip II of Nassau-Weilburg

Adolf, King of Germany
Gerlach I, Count of Nassau
Imagina of Isenburg-Limburg
John I, Count of Nassau-Weilburg
Henry "the Younger" of Hesse son of Henry I, Landgrave of Hesse
Agnes of Hesse
Agnes of Bavaria
Philipp I, Count of Nassau-Weilburg; Count of Saarbrücken
Simon of Saarbrücken-Commercy son of Jean I of Saarbrücken-Commercy
John II, Count of Saarbrücken
Margaret of Savoy daughter of Louis I of Vaud
Johanna of Saarbrücken
Peter of Bar-Pierrefort son of Theobald II, Count of Bar
Ghislette of Bar
Johanna of Vianden
Philip II, Count of Nassau-Weilburg
Rudolph, Duke of Lorraine
John I, Duke of Lorraine
Marie of Blois (fr) daughter of Guy I, Count of Blois
Frederick I, Count of Vaudémont
Eberhard II, Count of Württemberg
Sophie of Württemberg
Elizabeth of Henneberg-Schleusingen
Elisabeth of Lorraine-Vaudémont
Anseau of Joinville (fr)
Henry, Lord of Joinville
Marguerite of Vaudémont (fr)
Margaret of Joinville
John I of Luxembourg, Lord of Ligny
Marie of Luxembourg
Alix of Dampierre daughter of Guy of Dampierre

Philip II of Nassau-Weilburg House of Nassau Born: 14 March 1418 Died: 19 March 1492
Preceded by Philip I	Count of Nassau-Weilburg; 1429-1492	Succeeded by Louis I
