= Marie, Countess of Harcourt =

French countess (1398–1476)

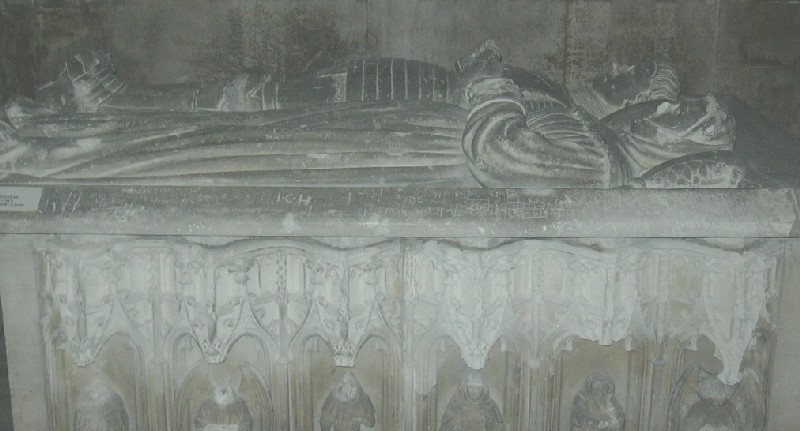
- Tomb of Marie of Harcourt and her husband Antoine de Vaudémont, in the church of the Cordeliers in Nancy
- Born: 9 September 1398
- Died: 19 April 1476 (aged 77)
- Buried: Nancy
- Noble family: House of Harcourt
- Spouse: Antoine of Lorraine
- Issue Detail: Frederick II of Vaudémont; Jean VIII of Harcourt-Lorraine; Henri of Lorraine (died 1505)
- Father: John VII of Harcourt
- Mother: Marie of Alençon

Marie of Harcourt (9 September 1398 – 19 April 1476) was a ruling suo jure Countess of Harcourt, and Baroness of Elbeuf from 1452 to 1476.

== Life ==
Marie was the eldest daughter of John VII of Harcourt, Count of Harcourt and Aumale and Baron of Elbeuf, and of Marie of Alençon. On 12 August 1416 she married Antoine of Lorraine (1400–1458), Count of Vaudémont and sire of Joinville.

Upon the death of her father in 1452, she attempted to claim the entire Harcourt inheritance, to the exclusion of her younger sister Jeanne of Harcourt. By 1454, Jeanne had established herself as Countess of Aumale, and Marie as Countess of Harcourt and Baroness of Elbeuf. These lands were to pass to her second son, John, but he predeceased her in 1473, so they went to her grandson Rene.

== Issue ==
- Frederic II of Vaudémont (1428–1470), count of Vaudémont and sire of Joinville, in 1445 married Yolande, Duchess of Lorraine of Anjou. Together Frederic and Yolande had six children.
- Jean of Lorraine, Count of Harcourt (died 1473), comte of Harcourt and of Aumale and baron of Elbeuf
- Henri (died 1505), bishop of Thérouanne (1447–1484), then of Metz (1484–1505)
- Marie (died 23 April 1455), in 1450 married Alain IX (died 1462), viscount of Rohan
- Marguerite of Lorraine, Dame d'Aerschot and de Bierbeke (died before 1474), in 1432 married Antoine I de Croy, Seigneur de Croy

== Sources ==
- Carroll, Stuart (1998). Noble Power During the French Wars of Religion. Cambridge University Press. ISBN 0-521-62404-5.
- Harcourt (1996). "Index des Noms de Personnes". Annuaire-Bulletin de la Société de l'histoire de France. Editions de Boccard: 131–135.

Marie, Countess of Harcourt House of Harcourt Born: 9 September 1398 Died: 19 April 1476
French nobility
| Preceded by John VII | Countess of Harcourt; Baroness of Elbeuf with Antoine 1452–1458; John VIII 1458–1473; René 1473–1476; 1452–1476 | Succeeded by René |
