= John II of Nassau-Saarbrücken =

Ruling Count of Nassau-Saarbrücken (1423-1472)

John II
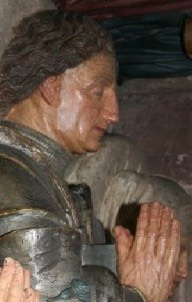
- Grave monument of Johan II (detail)
- Reign: 1429–1472
- Predecessor: Philipp I of Nassau-Weilburg
- Successor: John Louis, Count of Nassau-Saarbrücken
- Born: 4 April 1423; Saarbrücken
- Died: 15 July 1472 (aged 49); Vaihingen an der Enz
- Spouse: Johanna of Loon; Elisabeth of Württemberg-Urach
- House: Nassau-Saarbrücken
- Father: Philipp I of Nassau-Weilburg
- Mother: Elisabeth of Lorraine-Vaudémont

John II of Nassau-Saarbrücken (4 April 1423, in Saarbrücken – 15 July 1472, in Vaihingen an der Enz) the ruling Count of Nassau-Saarbrücken from 1429 to 1472.

== Biography ==
John II was born into the branch of the House of Nassau, as the son of Philipp I, Count of Nassau-Weilburg and his wife, Elisabeth of Lorraine-Vaudémont, member of the Vaudémont branch of the House of Lorraine, who acted as regent of Nassau-Saarbrücken during the monority of her son.

== Marriages and issue ==
He married Countess Johanna of Hainsberg-Loon (1443–1469), a daughter of John IV, Count of Loon and his wife, Johanna van Diest.

They had two daughters:

- Elizabeth (1459–1479), married William IV, Duke of Jülich-Berg in 1472
- Johanna (1464–1521), married John I, Count Palatine of Simmern in 1481.

After Johanna's death, he married Countess Elisabeth of Württemberg, the daughter of Count Louis I of Württemberg-Urach.

With her, he had a son:

- John Louis, succeeded as Count of Nassau-Saarbrücken

== Death ==
John II died on 15 July 1472 in Vaihingen an der Enz, Baden-Württemberg, aged 49.

He was interred, alongside both of his wives, in the Nassau family vault of the Gothic church of St Arnual, Saarbrücken, Germany.
