= Marie of Harcourt =

Marie of Harcourt may refer to:

- Marie of Harcourt (died 1464), lady of Parthenay, daughter of Jacques II d'Harcourt, baron of Montgomery, wife of Jean de Dunois
- Marie of Harcourt (1398-1476), countess of Aumale, daughter of John VII of Harcourt, wife of Antoine de Vaudémont, count of Vaudemont
