= Elisabeth of Lorraine-Vaudémont =

German countess and pioneer of the prose novel

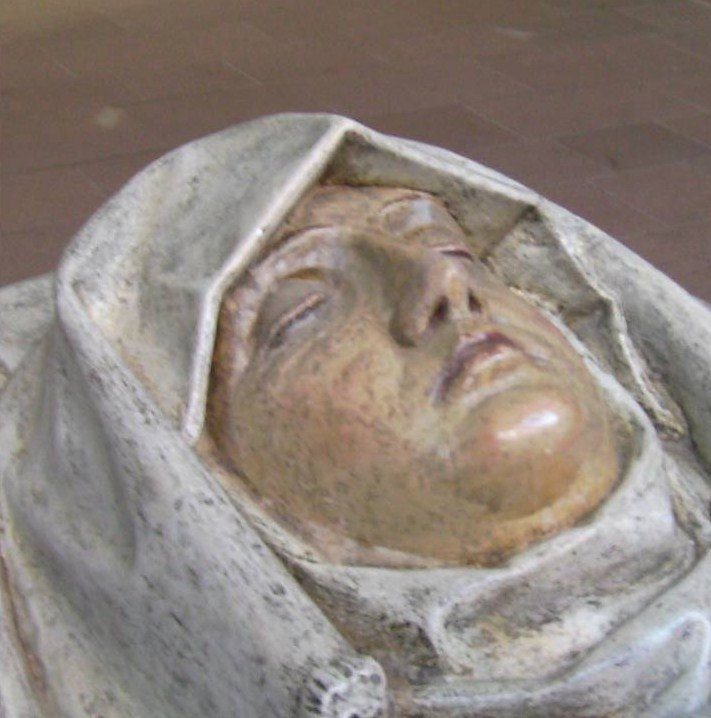
- Elisabeth of Lorraine-Vaudémont
- Born: c. 1395; Lorraine
- Died: 17 January 1456; Saarbrücken
- Buried: Collegiate Church in Sankt Arnual
- Noble family: House of Lorraine
- Spouse: Philipp I, Count of Nassau-Weilburg
- Father: Frederick I, Count of Vaudémont
- Mother: Margaret of Joinville

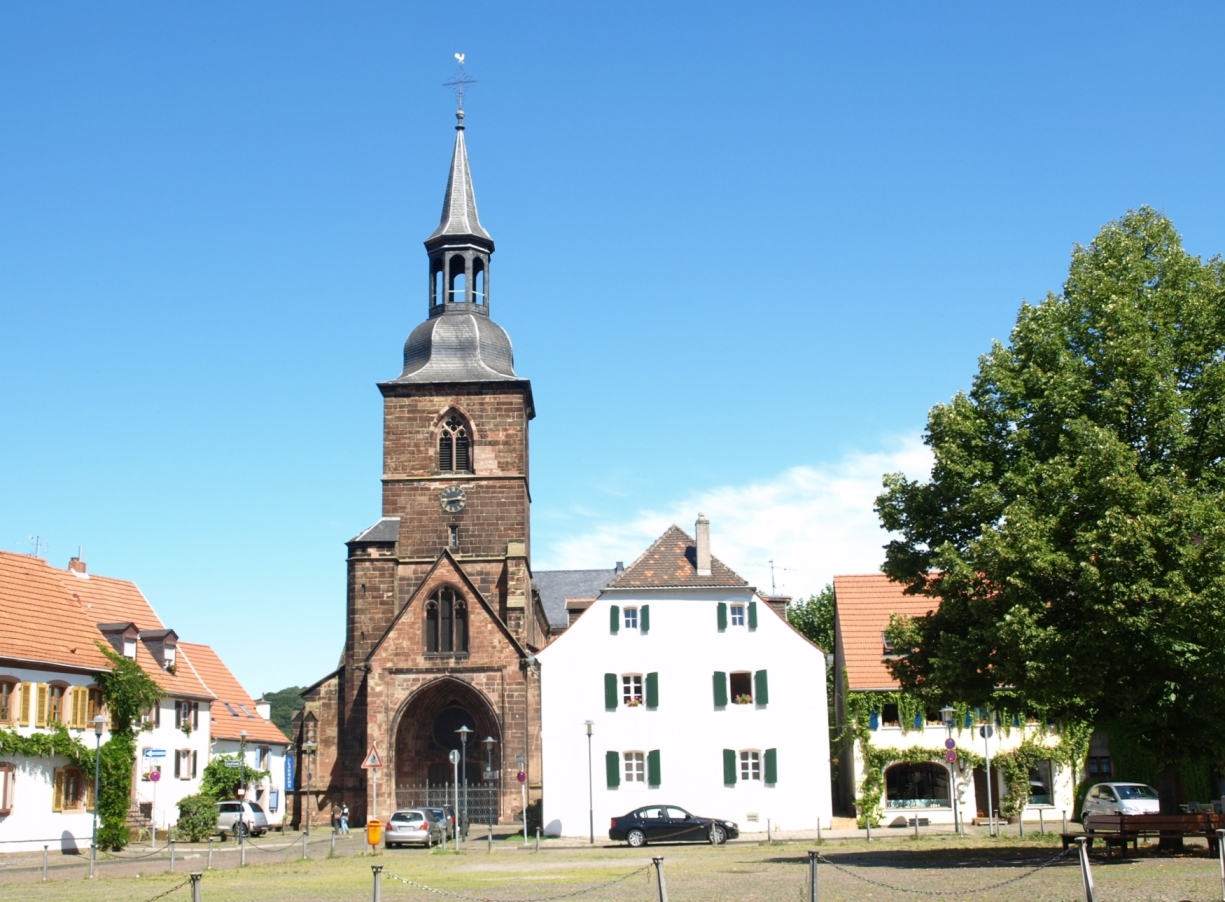
Collegiate Church of St. Arnual

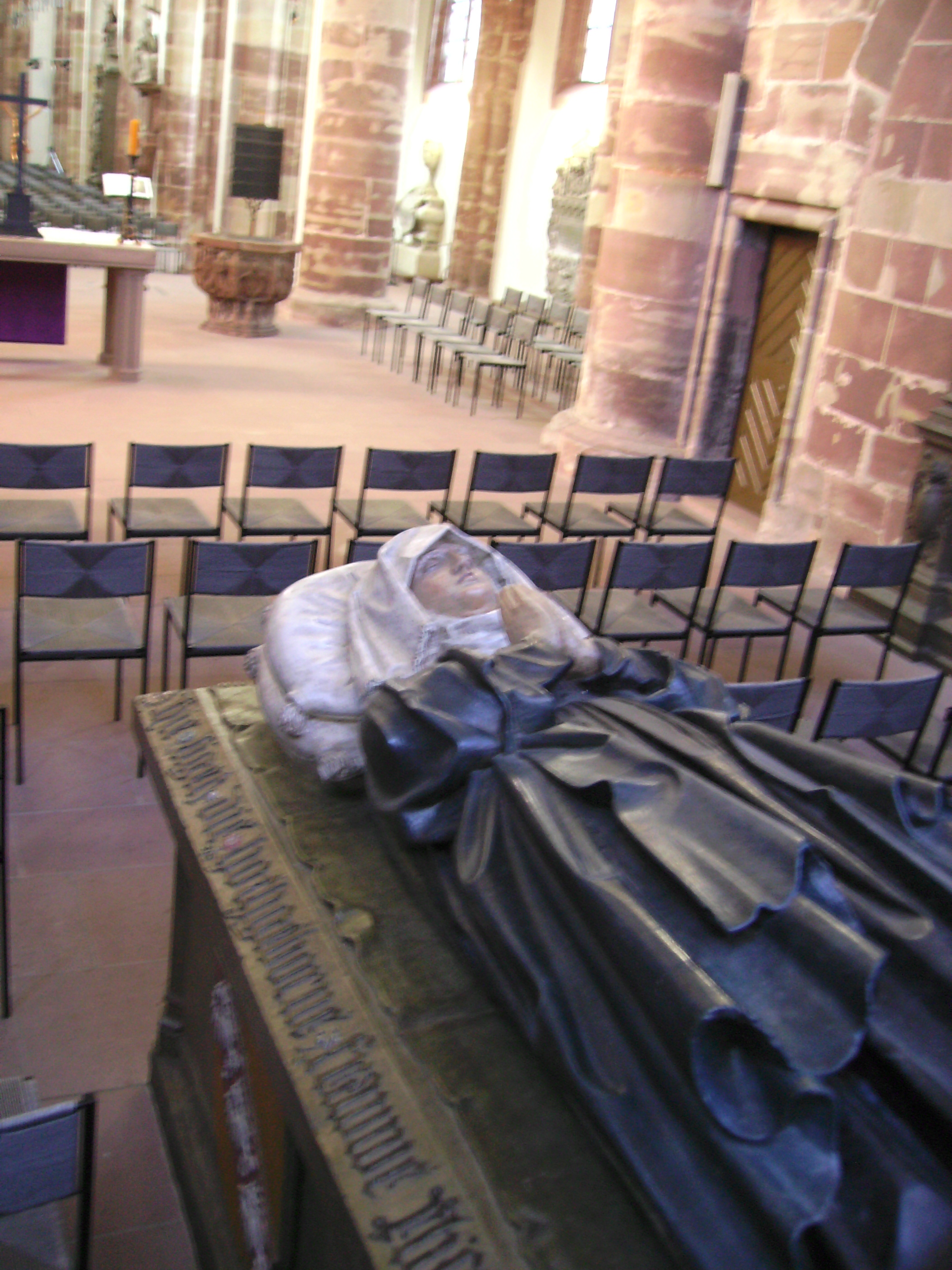
Tomb in the Collegiate Church of St. Arnual

Elizabeth of Lorraine-Vaudémont, Countess of Nassau-Saarbrücken (also known as Isabella of Lotharingen; c. 1395 in Lorraine – 17 January 1456 in Saarbrücken) was a German regent and translator. She was the Countess of Nassau-Weilburg by marriage to Philipp I, Count of Nassau-Weilburg, and the regent of the County of Nassau-Weilburg during the minority of her son Philip II between 1429 and 1438.

She was a pioneer of the novel in Early New High German language. Around 1437, she translated and edited four French romances (chansons de geste) by Odo Arpin of Bourges, Sibille, Loher & Maller and Hug Chapler.

== Life ==
Elizabeth was the daughter of Frederick of Lorraine (1368–1415) and Margaret of Joinville (c. 1354 – 1418). In 1412, she became the second wife of Count Philip I of Nassau-Weilburg-Saarbrücken (1368–1429).

=== Regency ===
After his death in 1429, she took over the regency for her infant son, Philip II (1418–1492) of the Nassau-Saarbrücken territory until her son became an adult in 1438. The territory consisted of the areas along the middle Saar, along the Blies, in eastern Lorraine, in today's Donnersbergkreis, around the city of Kirchheimbolanden, in the Taunus area, along the Lahn as well as Commercy in Lorraine on the Meuse.

She managed to keep her possessions together and to avoid disputes with her many neighbours. During her rule, Saarbrücken was developed into a residence town. She resided at Saarbrücken Castle on the Castle Rock with its steep slope towards the Saar. Until then, the territory had had no centralized administration, and its rulers had travelled constantly between their scattered possessions, in order to maintain their claim to power by being physically present some of the time in each and every possession ("rule by travelling around").

=== Death ===
Elisabeth died on 17 January 1456. Contrary to the customs of the ancient Counts of Saarbrücken, who were buried in Wadgassen, Elisabeth chose to be buried in the Collegiate Church in Sankt Arnual, which is now part of Saarbrücken. For the next 200 years, all Counts of Nassau-Saarbrücken would be buried here.

== Legacy ==
Elisabeth took care of her inheritance during her lifetime. In 1439, she divided her possessions among her two sons. The elder son, Philip II received the territories on the right bank of the Rhine; the younger son, John II received the territories on the left bank. Apparently John II, unlike his brother, was interested in his mother's literary activities. Among other things, he had magnificent manuscripts made of the novels his mother had translated These manuscripts and early printed copies are now held by the Herzog August Library in Wolfenbüttel and the State and University Library in Hamburg.

In April 2007, a large poster exhibition of Elisabeth's novels was held in Saarbrücken, in the framework of the city's participation in the activities of Luxembourg as Cultural Capital of Europe. A European Writers' Congress in Saarbrücken on 16 October 2007 had as its motto Ir herren machent fryden, with which Elisabeth began her translations.

== Marriage and issue ==
Elisabeth was the second wife of Count Philip I of Nassau-Weilburg-Saarbrücken (1368–1429) and had the following children with him:

1. Philip II of Nassau-Weilburg
2. John II of Nassau-Saarbrücken
3. Johannetta (d. 1 February 1481, Römhild), married on 22 June 1422 to Count George I of Henneberg
4. Margarete (26 April 1426 – 5 May 1490), married in 1441 to Gerhard of Rodemachern
