= Margaret of Joinville =

French noblewoman (1354-1418)

- Tomb illustration of Margaret and Frederick I
- Born: 1354
- Died: 1418 (aged 63–64)
- Noble family: House of Joinville
- Spouses: John of Châlon; Peter of Geneva; Frederick I, Count of Vaudémont
- Issue: Antoine, Count of Vaudémont; Elisabeth of Lorraine-Vaudémont; Margaret
- Father: Henry, Lord of Joinville
- Mother: Marie of Luxembourg

Margaret of Joinville (French: Marguerite de Joinville; 1354–1418), was a French noblewoman. From 1365 until her death, she was the ruling Lady of Joinville and Countess of Vaudémont.

== Family ==
Her father was Henry, Lord of Joinville. He was Count of Vaudémont as Henry V; he died when she was seven years old. Her mother was Marie of Luxembourg.

== Marriages and issue ==
In 1367, she married John of Châlon, Lord of Montaigu (1340-1373). This marriage was childless.

In 1374, she married Count Peter of Geneva. In 1378, Peter's brother Robert was elected antipope as Clement VII. Peter died in Robert's service in 1392. This marriage was also childless.

In 1392, Margaret married for the third time, to Frederick I (1368-1415), the younger brother of Duke Charles II of Lorraine. Together they had three children:

- Antoine (1397-1456), who succeeded as Count of Vaudémont, his grandson René II became Duke of Lorraine
- Elisabeth (1400-1458), who married in 1412 to Philipp I of Nassau-Weilburg, and
- Margaret, who married Thibault II of Blamont.
