= Black Band (landsknechts) =

16th century European mercenary group

The Black Band was a formation of 16th century mercenaries, largely pikemen, probably serving as Landsknechts. They fought in the French army for ten years, seeing service in several notable engagements, including the Battle of Marignano and the Battle of Pavia.

== Origin ==
The Black Band was created as the Black Guard in 1514 by George, Duke of Saxony, to fight for his claims in East Frisia against Edzard I, Count of East Frisia, in what was to become known as the Saxon feud.

It is not clear whether the band was newly founded or a continuation of the Great or Black Guard that had been founded in 1487 by Landsknechts formerly in Imperial service with Maximilian in Flanders. It fought in Northern Germany and Denmark, often against rebellious peasants, until its defeat at the Battle of Hemmingstedt on 17 February 1500. It is possible that at least some Fähnlein of the Black Guard survived during these fourteen years and were part, if not core, of the new formation.

This Black Guard took part in the campaign in East Frisia in 1514 and devastated large parts of it in the process. When the participation of George of Saxony in the Saxon Feud ended in 1515 at the mediation of Charles II, Duke of Guelders and Francis I of France, Charles of Guelders hired them and led them in support of Francis to Italy, where they entered French service.

There they joined an existing contingent of 12,000 Landsknechts in French service, drafted for a planned invasion of England under the Yorkist pretender Richard de la Pole that was aborted after the Anglo-French peace treaty of St Germain-en-Laye in 1514. Many of these Landsknechts were originally sent "on loan" to the French by Maximilian between 1512 and 1513 for service in Italy, notably at Brescia and Ravenna, and had defied his recall to Imperial service. Some of the members of the Black Band also chose not to enter French service and heed that recall.

The distinction between the two contingents soon was lost, and most sources call the whole French Landsknecht contingent the "Black Band" or "Black Legion" by the time of the Battle of Marignano.

== Organization and leadership ==
The full Landsknecht contingent of Francis I. army in 1515 was initially 17,000 men strong, composed of 12,000 pikemen, 2,000 arquebusiers, 2,000 two-handed swordsmen, and 1,000 halberdiers. Landsknecht contingents are organized in companies or Fähnlein of up to 500, with actual numbers often being lower than the nominal full strength.

Captain of the Black Band in 1525 was Georg Langenmantel, but it was also placed under the command of French officers, such as at Pavia, when it was nominally led by François de Lorraine and Richard de la Pole. By the time of the Battle of Pavia, they are described by Delbrück as 5,000 strong, by Konstam as 4,000 strong.

== Campaigns ==
The Black Band marched into Italy in 1515, led by Asche von Cramm, in time to fight alongside King Francis I at the Battle of Marignano, where, defending the ditch and supported by artillery, they nonetheless recoiled from the attacking Swiss, but did not break. Eventually they were relieved by the charge of the French gendarme heavy cavalry into the flank of the Swiss attack column.

Ten years later they were still in French service and appeared as the lead French infantry square at the Battle of Pavia, led by Francois de Lorraine and Richard de la Pole. In this battle they found themselves heavily outnumbered by two blocks of 12,000 Imperial Landsknechts opposing them, led by Georg von Frundsberg and Max Sittich von Ems. Before the battle Georg Langenmantel, Obrist of the band, stepped out and tried to challenge Frundsberg or Ems to single combat, but was killed by the Imperials in response. Struck in both flanks -- “seize[d] … as if with tongs”—and hacked to pieces, the Black Band was killed almost to the last man, including both of their leaders, and ceased to exist.

It was refounded and fought with a strength of 4,000 under Lautrec in the campaign against the Imperial army in Naples. The destruction of that army in August 1528 saw some 2,000 survivors, many of whom found service with the Imperial Landsknechts.

== Sources ==
- Arfaioli, Maurizio. The Black Bands of Giovanni, p. 143, 159-161. Pisa: Pisa University Press, 2005.
- Cuneo, Pia F. Art and Politics in Early Modern Germany: Jorg Breu the Elder and the Fashioning of Political Identity – CA 1475-1536, pp. 136–137. Leiden: Koninkliijke Brill NV, 1998.
- Delbrück, Hans. History of the Art of War, pp. 10, 92-93. Originally published in 1920; University of Nebraska Press (reprint), 1990 (trans. J. Renfroe Walter). Volume IV: The Origins of Modern Warfare.
- Knecht, R. J. Renaissance Warrior and Patron: The Reign of Francis I, p. 70. Cambridge: Cambridge University Press, 1994.
- Konstam, Angus. Pavia 1525: The Climax of the Italian Wars, pp. 65–73. Oxford: Osprey Publishing, 1996.
- Oman, Charles. A History of the Art of War in the Sixteenth Century. London: Methuen & Co., 1937.
- Onno Klopp. Geschichte Ostfrieslands, Band 1, Hannover 1854–1858, S.298f
- Wilson, John. The History of Switzerland, pp. 194-195. London: Longman, Rees, Orme, Brown, Green & Longman, 1832 (reprint 2005 Adamant Media Corporation).
