= François de Lorraine =

French noble

François de Lorraine (24 June 1506 – 24 February 1525) was the Lord of Lambesc, and a commander in the French army under Francis I of France. He was the youngest surviving son of René II, Duke of Lorraine and Philippa of Guelders. He commanded the Black Band of renegade Landsknechts at the Battle of Pavia, and in the bitter combat that ensued between the Black Band and Frundsberg's Imperial Landsknechts, Lorraine was killed.

== Sources ==
- Carroll, Stuart (2011). Martyrs and Murderers: The Guise Family and the Making of Europe. Oxford University Press.
- Knecht, R.J. (1982). Francis I. Cambridge University Press.
