= Jean, Count of Harcourt =

French noble

Jean of Lorraine-Vaudémont (died 1473) was a younger son of Antoine of Lorraine, Count of Vaudémont and Marie of Harcourt. He was Count of Harcourt and Count of Aumale, as well as Baron of Elbeuf.

His mother was the eldest daughter of Jean VII of Harcourt, Count of Harcourt and Aumale. Her brother, Jean VIII of Harcourt, her father's heir, died in 1424. In anticipation of this, she assigned to Jean the County of Harcourt in 1448. In 1449, at the breakdown of the Truce of Tours, he was sent as an ambassador to Philip III, Duke of Burgundy, by King Charles VII of France.

In 1452, his maternal grandfather died. Jean attempted to secure the whole inheritance for himself and his mother. After his father, he was Count of Harcourt and Count of Aumale (as "Jean VI"). While briefly effective, by 1454, his mother's younger sister had gained control of the County of Aumale.

He was appointed captain of Angers in 1469, and later seneschal and governor of Anjou. He died in 1473, unmarried, and was succeeded by his nephew, René II, Duke of Lorraine.

French nobility
Preceded by Antoine; Marie	Count of Harcourt; Baron of Elbeuf; 1458–1473; With: Marie	Succeeded by René; Marie
