= Frederick I of Vaudémont =

Count of Vaudémont

Frederick I, Count of Vaudémont
- Tomb illustration of Frederick and his wife
- Born: 9 January 1369
- Died: 25 October 1415; Agincourt
- Spouse: Margaret of Joinville
- Issue: Antoine; Elisabeth; Frederic; Charles; John
- House: House of Lorraine
- Father: John I, Duke of Lorraine
- Mother: Sophie of Württemberg

Frederick I, or Ferry I of Lorraine (9 January 1369 – 25 October 1415) was a Count of Vaudémont.

Frederick was the son of Duke John I of Lorraine (1346-1390) and Sophie of Württemberg (1343-1369). He was a younger brother of Charles II. In 1394, Frederick married Margaret, the heiress of Vaudémont and Joinville, and became Count of these lands in her right. He fought at the battle of Agincourt and was killed 25 October 1415.

His children were:

- Antoine, who succeeded as Count of Vaudémont,
- Elisabeth, who married Philipp I of Nassau-Weilburg,
- Frederic, Lord of Rumigny,
- Charles, Lord of Bovines, and
- John, Lord of Fleurines

== See also ==
- Dukes of Lorraine family tree

== Sources ==
- Bennett, Matthew; Nicolle, David; Evans, Martin Marix (2000). Agincourt 1415. Bloomsbury.
- Bogdan, Henry (2007). La Lorraine des Ducs (in French). Perrin.
- McDonald, R. Thomas (2016). "Lorraine". In Kibler, William W.; Zinn, Grover A. (eds.). Medieval France: An Encyclopedia. Routledge. pp. 560–561.
