= Antoine, Count of Vaudémont =

Count of Vaudémont and Sieur de Joinville

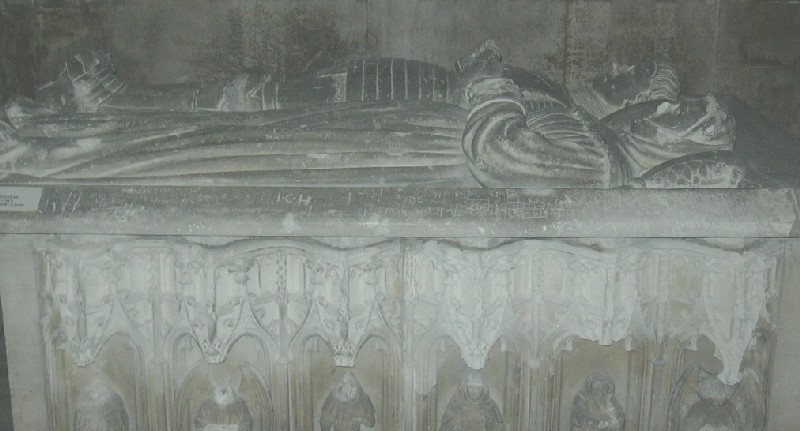
- Tomb of Antoine and his wife in the St-François-des-Cordeliers church in Nancy
- Born: c. 1400
- Died: 22 March 1458
- Buried: St-François-des-Cordeliers church in Nancy
- Noble family: House of Lorraine
- Spouse: Marie of Harcourt
- Issue Detail: Frederick II of Vaudémont; Jean VIII of Harcourt-Lorraine; Henri of Lorraine (died 1505)
- Father: Frederick of Lorraine, Count of Vaudémont
- Mother: Margaret of Joinville

Antoine of Vaudémont (c. 1400 – 22 March 1458) was Count of Vaudémont and Sieur de Joinville from 1418 to 1458. By marriage, he was also Count of Harcourt, Count of Aumale, and Baron of Elbeuf from 1452 to 1458.

== Life ==
His uncle Charles II, Duke of Lorraine had only daughters. Antoine did not conceal his wish to inherit the Duchy of Lorraine, and quarrelled with Charles. Charles attacked Antoine, but Antoine had Philip the Good of Burgundy as an ally.

After Charles II died in 1431, Antoine attacked the new Duke, René of Anjou, defeating and capturing him at the Battle of Bulgnéville, on 1 July 1431. A decade of negotiation followed, since Sigismund, Holy Roman Emperor was unwilling to recognise Antoine as Duke, pronouncing for René in 1434.

Ultimately, Antoine gave up his claim on the Duchy of Lorraine, by a treaty of 27 March 1441. In return, Antoine's County of Vaudémont was recognised as independent, and his son Frederick bethrothed to the Duke's daughter Yolande of Lorraine. The dynastic consequence was that Antoine's grandson became Duke.

Antoine also took part in several local armed conflicts.

== Family ==
Antoine was the son of Frederick I of Lorraine, Count of Vaudémont and Margaret of Joinville. He married Marie of Harcourt (1398–1476), on 12 August 1416. She was Countess of Harcourt, and of Aumale, and Baroness of Elbeuf. Her father was John VII of Harcourt, Count of Harcourt and Aumale, and her mother was Marie of Alençon. Their children were:

- Frederick II of Lorraine-Vaudémont (1428–1470), Count of Vaudémont and sire of Joinville
- Henri of Lorraine-Vaudémont (died 1505), Bishop of Thérouanne (1447–1484), and then Bishop of Metz (1484–1505)
- Philippe, died young
- John of Lorraine-Vaudémont (died 1473), Count of Harcourt and Aumale, as well as Baron of Elbeuf.
- Marie of Lorraine-Vaudémont (died 1455), who married in 1450, Alain IX of Rohan (died 1462).
- Marguerite of Lorraine-Vaudémont, Dame d'Aarschot (died before 1474), married in 1432, Antoine I de Croÿ, Count of Porcéan.

== Sources ==
- Guenee, Bernard (1987). Between Church and State: The Lives of Four French Prelates in the Late Middle Ages. The University of Chicago Press.
- Vaughan, Richard (2002). Philip the Good. Boydell Press.

Antoine, Count of Vaudémont House of Vaudémont Born: c. 1400 Died: 22 March 1458
Titles of nobility
Preceded by Frederick I	Count of Vaudémont; 1418–1458	Succeeded by Frederick II
French nobility
Preceded by John VII	Count of Aumale; Baron of Elbeuf; 1452–1458; With: Marie	Succeeded by John VIII; Marie
