= Philipp I of Nassau-Weilburg =

Count of Nassau-Weilburg (1371–1429) and Saarbrücken (1381-1429)

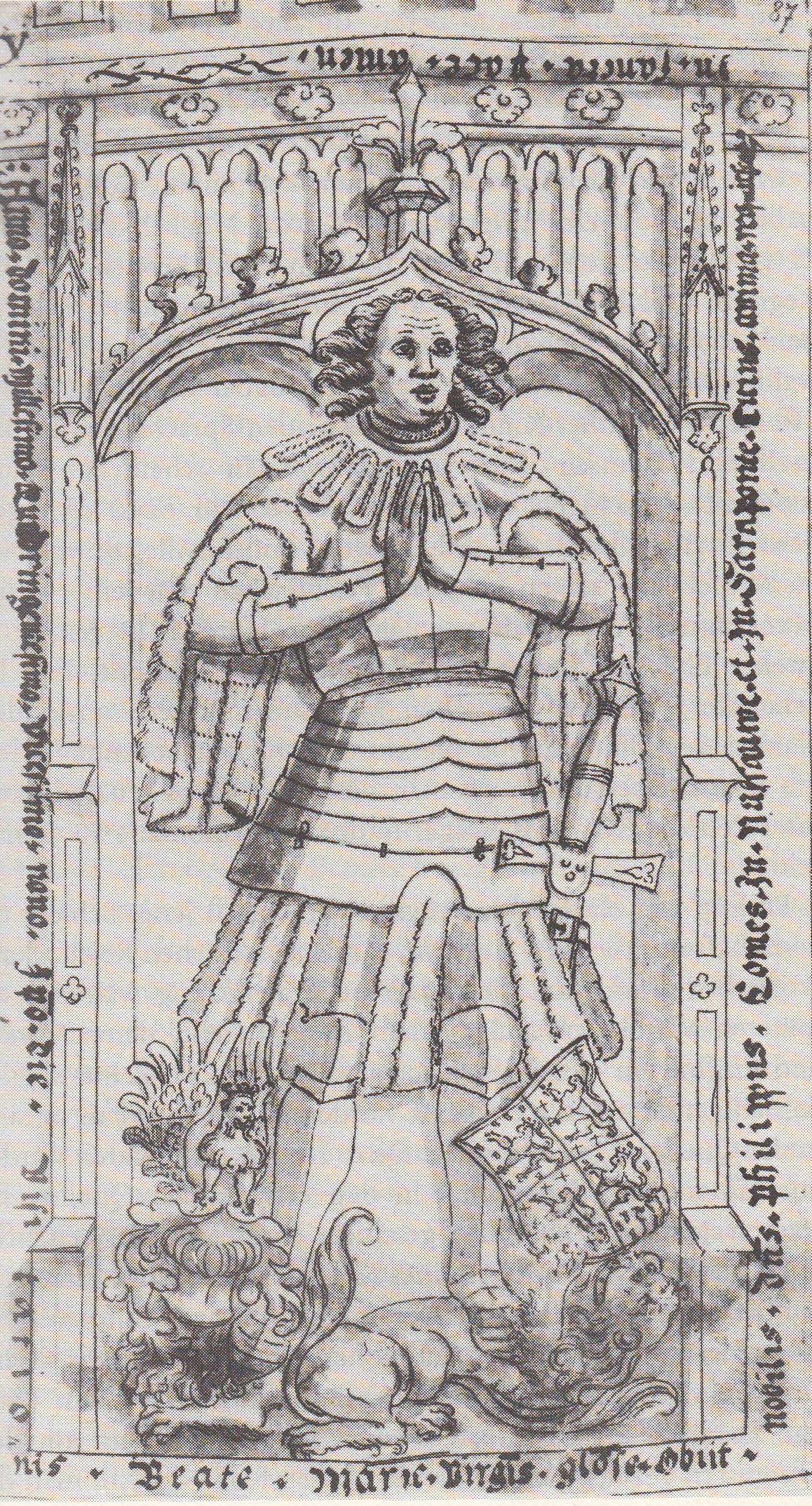
- Born: 1368; Weilburg
- Died: 2 July 1429; Wiesbaden
- Buried: Klarenthal Abbey
- Noble family: House of Nassau
- Spouses: Anna of Hohenlohe-Weikersheim; Elisabeth of Lorraine-Vaudémont
- Father: John I of Nassau-Weilburg
- Mother: Johanna of Saarbrücken

Coat of arms of Nassau-Saarbrücken

Count Philipp I of Nassau-Weilburg (1368 – 2 July 1429) was Count of Nassau in Weilburg, Count of Saarbrücken and Seigneur of Commercy Château bas in 1371–1429.

== Biography ==
Philipp was a son of John I, Count of Nassau-Weilburg (1309 – 1371) and Johanna, Countess of Saarbrücken (d. 1381), daughter of John II, Count of Saarbrücken (d. 1381).

Philipp inherited the County of Nassau-Weilburg from his father in 1371 and the County of Saarbrücken from his mother 1381. For the first ten years, his mother was the regent in his place, then bishop Friedrich of Blankenheim was the regent until his majority.

Philipp married twice and had several children, and his first wife Anna brought some territories in Trier that were added to his realm. At Philipps death in 1429, the counties were ruled jointly by his eldest sons, with their mother Elisabeth as regent until 1442, then it was divided between them, Philipp getting Nassau-Weilburg and Johann getting Saarbrücken and Commercy. At Philip's majority in 1438 he began ruling in collaboration with his mother, and provisions were made for her future.

In the war 1387–1389 (de) Philipp sided with the Bavarian duchies, against the Swabian union (de). For his achievements at the battle of Döffingen (de) he was honoured with the accolade. His involvement gave important allies and influence in southern Germany. In 1398 he was accredited with the privileges of coinage by Emperor Wenceslaus, and the power of his realm was consolidated. The emperor appointed him also to supervise the "landfrieden" in Rhine and Wetterau areas. In the national politics he both collaborated in the removal of emperor Wenceslaus 1400, protecting his successor Rupert and then joining many other lords in the opposition against him 1405–07, and until his Rupert's death in 1410. He participated at the crowning of the successor, Sigismund, Holy Roman Emperor, who elevated him, and made him a member of his council, and "Hauptmann" (leader) of the nobility in Luxembourg. He was also a member of the council of the French king.

At the Council of Constance, Philipp supported King Sigismund against the policies of certain Popes, at the time of the Western Schism.

== Marriage and issue ==
Firstly, Philipp married in 1385 with Anna of Hohenlohe-Weikersheim (d. 11 October 1410), daughter of Count Kraft IV of Hohenlohe-Weikersheim (de) (d. 1399). They had:

- Philip (1388 – 19 March 1416).

Secondly, he married in 1412 with Elisabeth of Lorraine-Vaudémont (c. 1395 – 1456), who bore:

- Philip II of Nassau-Weilburg (14 March 1418 – 19 March 1492), married Margaret of Loon-Heinsberg. He was the founder of the Nassau-Weilburg line (extinct 1912 on male side). he married secondly Veronika of Sayn-Wittgenstein.
- John II of Nassau-Saarbrücken (4 April 1423 - 15 July 1472), married Johanna (1443 - 1469), daughter of Margaret's brother, Johann IV of Loon-Heinsberg (d. 1448), and had two daughters. He married secondly Elisabeth of Württemberg-Urach, and founded the Nassau-Saarbrücken line (extinct 1574). In 1444 he sold the Seigneurie of Commercy "Château-Bas" to Louis of Lorraine (1427 - 1445), marquis Pont-à-Mousson, son of King René of Anjou (1409 - 1480), who inherited the property from his son.
- Margarete (26 April 1426 – 5 May 1490), married in 1441 to Gerhard of Rodemachern (Rodemack) (d. 1388?). They probably had about four daughters.

One daughter may have been from either marriage, probably with Anna:

- Johannetta (d. 1 February 1481, Römhild), married on 22 June 1422 to Count George I of Henneberg (de).

Also, he had at least three illegitimate children:

- Philipp of Nassau
- Grete (d. 1437)
- Heintzchen of Nassau

== Ancestry ==
Ancestors of Philipp I of Nassau-Weilburg

16. Walram II, Count of Nassau
8. Adolf, King of Germany
17. Adelheid of Katzenelnbogen
4. Gerlach I, Count of Nassau
18. Gerlach IV of Isenburg-Limburg
9. Imagina of Isenburg-Limburg
19. Imagina of Blieskastel
2. John I, Count of Nassau-Weilburg
20. Henry I, Landgrave of Hesse
10. Henry "the Younger" of Hesse
21. Adelheid of Brunswick-Lüneburg; daughter of Otto I, Duke of Brunswick-Lüneburg
5. Agnes of Hesse
22. Louis II, Duke of Bavaria
11. Agnes of Bavaria
23. Matilda of Habsburg
1. Philipp I, Count of Nassau-Weilburg
24. Jean I of Saarbrücken-Commercy; son of Simon IV, Count of Saarbrücken
12. Simon of Saarbrücken-Commercy
25. Mahaut of Aspremont
6. John II, Count of Saarbrücken
26. Louis I of Savoy, Baron of Vaud
13. Margaret of Savoy
27. Jeanne de Montfort de Chambéon
3. Johanna of Saarbrücken
28. Theobald II, Count of Bar
14. Peter of Bar-Pierrefort
29. Jeanne of Toucy-Saint-Fargeau
7. Ghislette of Bar
30. Philipp I, Count of Vianden; or Hugues of Vienne, Sire of Longwy and Pagny
15. Johanna of Vianden
31. Maria of Brabant-Perwez; daughter of Godfrey of Leuven

Philipp I of Nassau-Weilburg House of Nassau Born: 1368 Died: 2 July 1429
Preceded by John I	Count of Nassau-Weilburg; 1371–1429	Succeeded by Philip II
Preceded by Johanna (as Countess of Saarbrücken, Dame of Commercy)	Count of Nassau-Saarbrücken; 1381–1429	Succeeded by John II
Preceded by Johanna (as Countess of Saarbrücken, Dame of Commercy)	Seigneur of Commercy; Château bas 1381–1429	Succeeded by John II
