= Frederick II, Count of Vaudémont =

Count of Vaudémont and Lord of Joinville

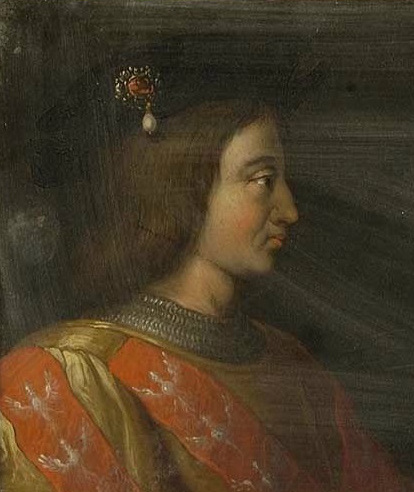
- 17th-century portrait of Frederick II
- Born: c. 1428
- Died: 31 August 1470 (aged 41–42); Joinville
- Noble family: House of Lorraine
- Spouse: Yolande of Anjou (later Duchess of Lorraine) (m. 1445)
- Issue: René II, Duke of Lorraine; Nicholas, Lord of Joinville; Joan, Duchess of Anjou; Yolande, Landgravine of Hesse; Margaret, Duchess of Alençon
- Father: Antoine, Count of Vaudémont
- Mother: Marie, Countess of Harcourt

Frederick (Ferry) II of Lorraine-Vaudémont (c. 1428 – 31 August 1470) was a French nobleman. He was Count of Vaudémont and Lord of Joinville from 1458 to 1470. He is sometimes numbered Frederick V by continuity with the Dukes of Lorraine.

== Life ==
Frederick was born c. 1428 as the son of Antoine of Lorraine, Count of Vaudémont and Lord of Joinville, and Marie of Harcourt, Countess of Harcourt and Aumale, as well as Baroness of Elbeuf. In 1445, he competed in tournament at Nancy as one of the five defenders and the same year jousted at Chalons-sur-Marne. At Chinon/Razilly and Launay in 1446 he jousted, while at Tarascon the same year, Frederick won the grand prize. In 1448, he was made a member of the Order of the Crescent.

In 1445, he married his cousin Yolande of Anjou (1428–1483), daughter of René I of Anjou, (King of Naples, Duke of Anjou, of Bar and of Lorraine, Count of Provence), and of Isabelle, Duchess of Lorraine. This marriage put an end to the litigation which existed between the fathers of the bride and groom, in connection with the succession of the Duchy of Lorraine. They had:

- Peter (died 1451)
- René II of Lorraine (1451–1508), Duke of Lorraine
- Nicholas, Lord of Joinville and Bauffremont (died about 1476)
- Joan (1458–01.25.1480), married Charles IV, Duke of Anjou in 1474
- Yolande, married William II, Landgrave of Hesse in 1497
- Margaret (1463–1521), married René of Alençon in 1488

In 1453 his father-in-law honoured him with the command of the troops that he sent to the Dauphin Louis to help him to fight the Duke of Savoy.

In 1456 René entrusted the government of the Duchy of Bar to Frederick, and in 1459 granted him the honorary title of Lieutenant-General of Sicily.

Frederick died in Joinville on August 31, 1470.

== Sources ==
- Blunk, Catherine; Brown-Grant, Rosalind (2025). "The Pas de la Joyeuse Garde/Pas de Saumur (Pas of the Joyous Guard/Pas of Saumur), 1446". In Brown-Grant, Rosalind; Damen, Mario (eds.). Pas D'armes and Late Medieval Chivalry: A Casebook. Liverpool University Press. pp. 80–110. ISBN 9781835537671.
- Guenee, Bernard (1987). Between Church and State: The Lives of Four French Prelates in the Late Middle Ages. The University of Chicago Press.
- Munns, Jessica; Richards, Penny; Spangler, Jonathan W., eds. (2016). Aspiration, Representation and Memory: The Guise in Europe, 1506–1688. Routledge.
- Potter, David (1995). A History of France, 1460-1560: The Emergence of a Nation State. St. Martin's Press.

Frederick II, Count of Vaudémont House of Vaudémont Born: c. 1428 Died: 31 August 1470
Titles of nobility
Preceded by Antoine	Count of Vaudémont; 1458–1470	Succeeded by René II
