= Louis, Count of Vaudémont =

French noble

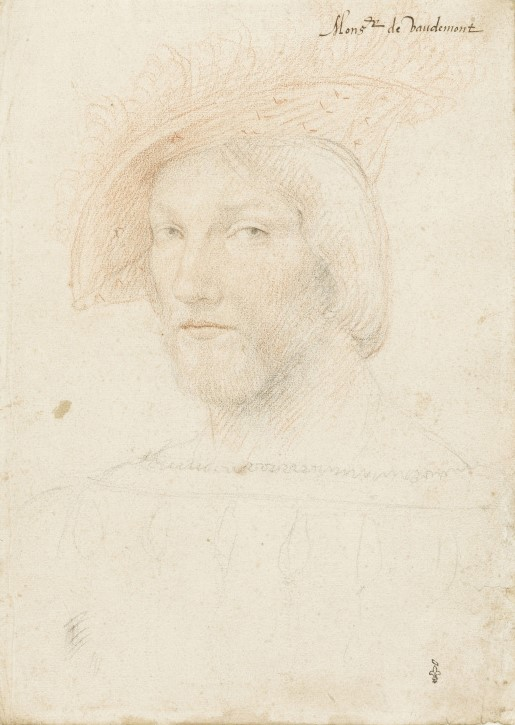
Portrait by Jean Clouet, c. 1525

Louis de Lorraine (27 April 1500 – 23 August 1528) was a nobleman of Lorraine who attempted to claim the Kingdom of Naples. He was styled as the Count of Vaudémont.

A younger son of René II, Duke of Lorraine, he was born in Bar-le-Duc in 1500. His family possessed a hereditary claim to the throne of Naples, and his father had accepted the throne of Naples in 1493. However, the ambitions of Charles VIII towards the same object prevented René from taking up rule in Italy. Upon his death in 1508, Louis' older brother Antoine reverted to the style of Duke of Calabria to indicate his family's claims on Naples.

Originally destined for the Church and styled Prince de l'Eglise, he became Bishop of Verdun in 1508 and Abbot of Saint-Mihiel in 1512. He was present at the Field of the Cloth of Gold in 1520. He abandoned his ecclesiastical career in 1522, taking the title of Count of Vaudémont.

Louis was present with the army led by Francis I into Italy in 1524, and fought at the Battle of Pavia. With the outbreak of the War of the League of Cognac, Louis was sent into Italy with an army under the command of Lautrec, and was invested by Pope Clement VII as King of Naples and Sicily. Salerno fell to the invaders on 17 March 1527, but the siege of Naples by the French army was prolonged and unsuccessful. When plague broke out in the encampment, both Lautrec and Vaudémont succumbed.

Religious titles
| Preceded by Warry de Dommartin | Bishop of Verdun; 1508–1522 | Succeeded by John of Lorraine |
