= René II of Lorraine =

Duke of Lorraine from 1473 to 1508

René II
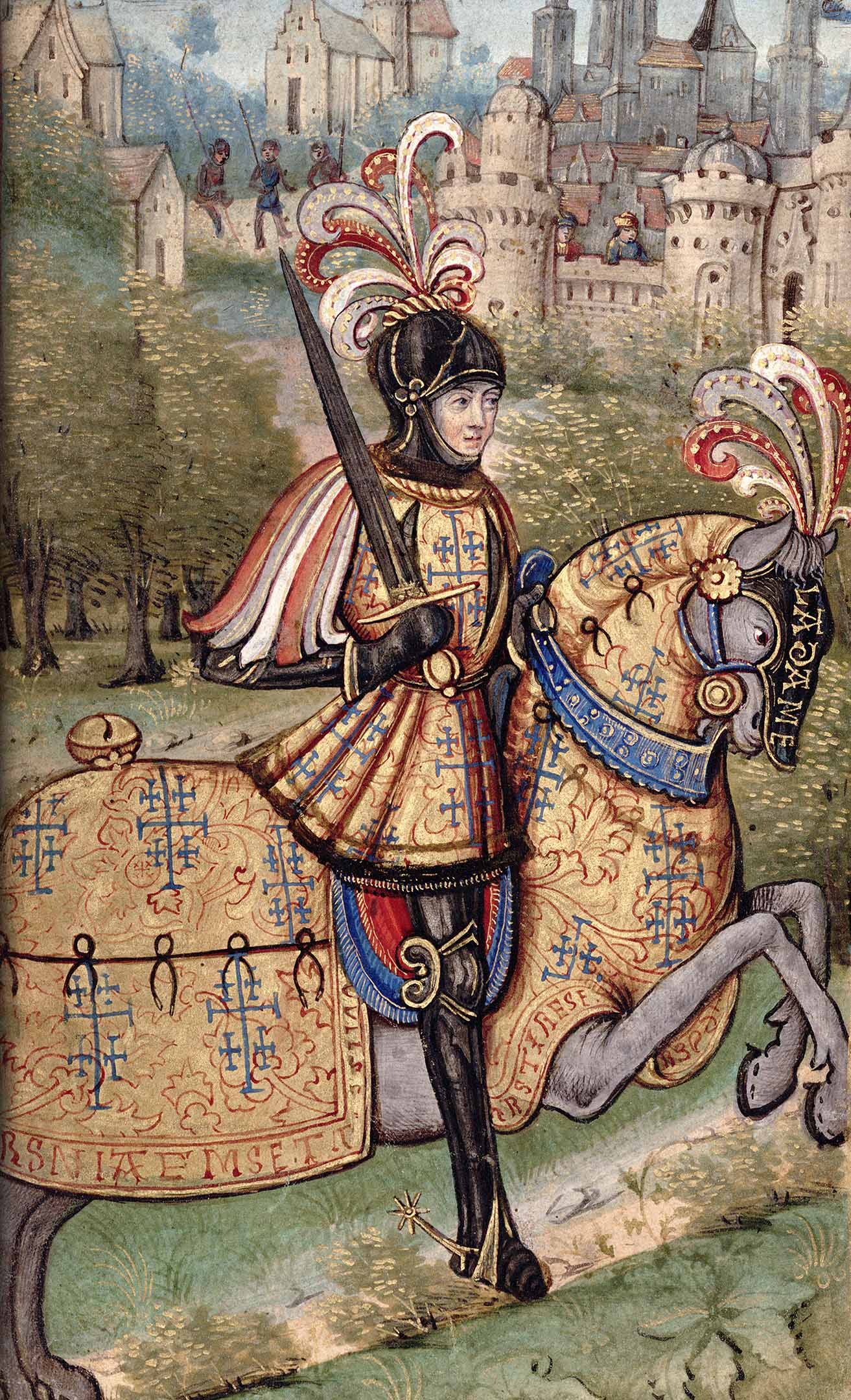
- René at the Battle of Nancy, as depicted in La Nancéide, 1518

Duke of Lorraine
- Reign: 24 July 1473 – 10 December 1508
- Predecessor: Nicholas I
- Successor: Antoine

Duke of Bar
- Reign: 23 March 1483 – 10 December 1508
- Predecessor: Yolande
- Successor: Antoine

Count of Vaudémont
- Reign: 31 August 1470 – 10 December 1508
- Predecessor: Yolande
- Successor: Antoine
- Born: 2 May 1451; Angers
- Died: 10 December 1508 (aged 57); Fains
- Spouse: Philippa of Guelders (m. 1485)
- Issue: Antoine, Duke of Lorraine; Claude, Duke of Guise; John, Cardinal of Lorraine; Louis, Count of Vaudémont; François de Lorraine
- House: Lorraine
- Father: Frederick II of Vaudémont
- Mother: Yolande of Lorraine

René II (2 May 1451 – 10 December 1508) was Count of Vaudémont from 1470, Duke of Lorraine from 1473, and Duke of Bar from 1483 to 1508. He claimed the crown of the Kingdom of Naples and the County of Provence as the Duke of Calabria 1480–1493 and as King of Naples and Jerusalem 1493–1508. He succeeded his uncle John of Vaudémont as Count of Harcourt in 1473, exchanging it for the county of Aumale in 1495. He succeeded as Count of Guise in 1504.

== Life ==
René was born in Angers, the son of Yolande of Lorraine and Frederick, Count of Vaudémont. He spent his youth in the court of his grandfather René I of Anjou between Angers and Provence. René succeeded his father as count of Vaudémont in 1470 and, three years later, his uncle as captain of Angers, seneschal and governor of Anjou. That same year he became Duke of Lorraine, which was at the time under the pressure of both Louis XI of France and Charles the Bold of Burgundy, with whom he initially allied. When the latter began to establish garrisons in Lorraine, however, René secretly allied with Louis (1474).

Charles invaded the duchy and René was forced to quit Nancy (30 November 1475). He regained the city on 5 October the following year and moved to Switzerland to hire an army of Swiss mercenaries. With this force René defeated and killed Charles at the Battle of Nancy (5 January 1477), ending the Burgundian Wars. In 1476, upon the death of his grandmother, he became sole Count of Harcourt and Baron of Elbeuf.

The alliance with Louis would not last, as Louis moved to acquire René's lands. In June 1478, as compensation for the royal seizure of Anjou and Provence, Louis XI reaffirmed his rights to the formerly Burgundian possessions of the Duchy of Luxembourg and the County of Burgundy, and then transferred those rights to René and all of his descendants.

The transfer of the County of Burgundy to France in 1482 with the Treaty of Arras made realization of these rights possible, but the County was returned to the Habsburgs in 1493 with the Treaty of Senlis and René would not exercise control over the County again. Likewise, any authority over Luxembourg was merely theoretical outside of the seizure of Virton, as the Duchy remained in possession of the Habsburgs throughout René's lifetime.

In 1480 René succeeded his grandfather as Duke of Bar while his mother was still living. In 1482 he conquered the prévôté of Virton, a part of the Duchy of Luxembourg, and annexed it to Bar. In 1484 Peter II, Duke of Bourbon, regent for the young King Charles VIII of France, formally installed him in the Duchy of Bar.

When his mother Yolande died in 1483, he succeeded her in her claims to the kingdoms of Naples and Jerusalem. In 1482, René traveled to Italy and defeated the Duke of Ferrara in the Battle of Adria as an ally of the Republic of Venice.

In 1485 René took part in the first phase of the so-called "Mad War", but prudentially retired after a while. In 1488 the Neapolitans offered him the crown of the Kingdom of Naples, and René set an expedition to gain possession of the realm; he was however halted by the new French king, Charles VIII, who intended to claim the realm himself.

In 1495, to settle a dispute with his second cousin, Jean IV de Rieux, over their grandmothers' inheritance, he ceded to Jean the county of Harcourt and its appurtenances, retaining only Elbeuf and Brionne, and receiving the county of Aumale.

== Death ==
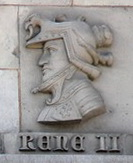
René II's effigy on the Porte de la Craffe at Nancy.

René fell ill during a hunt in Fains, and died on 10 December 1508, aged 57.

== Family ==
On his mother's side, he was a grandson of Isabella, Duchess of Lorraine. His father was a member of the Vaudémont family, a junior branch of the Lorraine ducal family, descending from John I, Duke of Lorraine. He was thus both heir-general and heir-male to the Duchy when he succeeded on the death of his cousin Nicholas in 1473.

René married Philippa of Guelders, daughter of Adolf, Duke of Guelders, in Orléans on 1 September 1485 and had the following children:

- Charles (b. 17 August 1486, Nancy); died at birth
- Francis (5 July 1487, Pont-à-Mousson); died at birth
- Antoine, Duke of Lorraine (1489–1544)
- Nicholas (9 April 1493, Nancy); died at birth
- Claude, Duke of Guise (1496–1550); first Duke of Guise
- Jean, Cardinal of Lorraine and Bishop of Metz (1498–1550)
- Louis, Count of Vaudémont (1500–1528)
- François, Count of Lambesc (1506–1525)
- Anne (19 December 1490, Bar-le-Duc), died at birth
- Isabelle (2 November 1494, Lunéville died at birth
- Claude and Catherine (twins) (24 November 1502, Bar-le-Duc); died at birth

== See also ==
- Dukes of Lorraine family tree

== Sources ==
- Bogdan, Henry (2013). La Lorraine des ducs (in French). Tempus.
- Carroll, Stuart (1998). Noble Power During the French Wars of Religion: The Guise Affinity and the Catholic Cause in Normandy. Cambridge University Press.
- Carroll, Stuart (2011). Martyrs and Murderers: The Guise Family and the Making of Europe. Oxford University Press.
- Gillespie, Alexander (2017). The Causes of War: Volume III: 1400 CE to 1650 CE. Vol. III. Hart Publishing.
- Lepage, Henri (1884). "La guerre de Sedan: Episode du règne de René II (1493–1496)". Mémoires de la Société d'archéologie lorraine. 3. 34: 183–224.
- Monter, E. William (2007). A Bewitched Duchy: Lorraine and Its Dukes, 1477–1736. Librairie Droz.
- Wellman, Kathleen (2013). Queens and Mistresses of Renaissance France. Yale University Press.

Titles of nobility
Preceded by Frederick II	Count of Vaudémont; 1470–1508	Succeeded by Antoine
Preceded by Nicholas I	Duke of Lorraine; 1473–1508; With: Yolande 1473–1483	Succeeded by Antoine
Vacant Title last held by Nicholas I	Marquis of Pont-à-Mousson; 1480–1508	Succeeded by Antoine
Preceded by Yolande	Duke of Bar; 1483–1508	Succeeded by Antoine
French nobility
Preceded by John	Count of Harcourt; 1473–1495	Succeeded by Jean IV
Preceded by John	Baron of Elbeuf; 1473–1508	Succeeded by Claude
Preceded by Jean IV	Count of Aumale; 1495–1508	Succeeded by Claude
Preceded by Charlotte	Count of Guise; 1504–1508	Succeeded by Claude
