= Henri of Lorraine-Vaudémont =

Bishop of Thérouanne, bishop of Metz

Coat-of-arms of Henri of Lorraine-Vaudémont, bishop.

Henri of Lorraine-Vaudémont (died 20 October 1505) was bishop of Thérouanne, and then bishop of Metz from 1484 to 1505. From an aristocratic family, he was son of Antoine of Vaudémont.

== Life ==
He was probably born in the early 1430s. He became a canon at Toul and then at Metz. He studied theology at Paris, and became bishop of Thérouanne in 1456.

He was administrator of the County of Vaudémont, while his brother Frederick, Count of Vaudémont was on campaign in Catalonia with John II, Duke of Lorraine.

On his 1484 nomination as bishop of Metz, a quarrel with the citizens had to be resolved by the intervention of the Emperor Frederick III. He added to Metz Cathedral.
