= Count of Vaudémont =

Noble title in medieval France

Arms of the Count of Vaudémont

The title Count of Vaudémont was granted to Gérard 1st of Vaudémont in 1070, after he supported the succession of his brother, Theodoric II, Duke of Lorraine to the Duchy of Lorraine. Counts of Vaudémont served as vassals of the Dukes of Lorraine. After 1473 the title was held by the Duke of Lorraine and was bestowed on younger sons of the Duke. It was later restyled "Prince of Vaudémont".

== House of Alsace ==
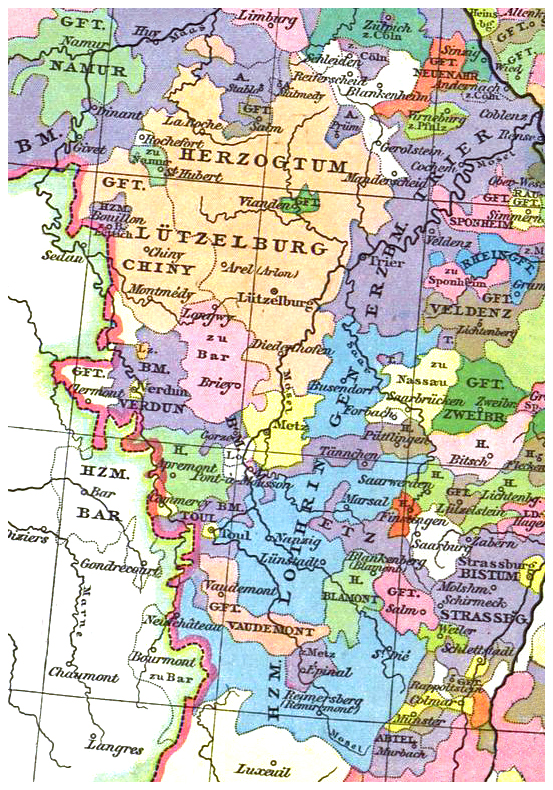
County of Vaudémont (orange), and the surrounding Duchy of Lorraine (blue) in the middle of the 14th century

- 1070-1118 Gérard I of Vaudémont (c. 1060–1118), son of Gérard d'Alsace: married in 1080 to Hedwig Dagsbourg
- 1118-1155 Hugh I Vaudémont' (d. 1155), son of the previous count: married in 1130 to Aigeline (or Anne) Burgundy (1116–1163), daughter of Hugh II of Burgundy, and Mathilde Turenne
- 1155-1188 Gerard II Vaudémont (d. 1188), son of the previous count: married his first wife in 1158 to Gertrude Joinville, daughter of Geoffroy of Joinville: second marriage in 1187 to Ombeline Vandoeuvre
- 1188-1242 Hugues II Vaudémont (d. 1242), son of the former Gertrude and Joinville: married in 1189 to Hedwig Raynel lady Gondrecourt
- 1242-1244 Hugues III of Vaudémont (d. 1244), son of the previous count: married to Marguerite de Bar, daughter of Theobald I of Bar, Count Bar and Luxembourg and Ermesinde Luxembourg
- 1244-1278 Henry I of Vaudémont (1232–1278), son of the previous count: married to Marguerite de la Roche, daughter of Guy I de La Roche, Duke of Athens
- 1278-1279 Renaud of Vaudémont (1252–1279), son of the previous count
- 1279-1299 Henri II of Vaudémont (1255–1299), brother of the preceding: married to Hélisente Vergy, daughter of John I of Vergy and Marguerite de Noyers
- 1299-1348 Henri III of Vaudémont (d. 1348), son of the previous count: married in 1306 to Isabelle of Lorraine (d.1335), daughter of Frederick III, Duke of Lorraine, Duke of Lorraine and Marguerite de Champagne

Henri IV Vaudémont (1310–1346), son of previous count, became de facto count in his father's later years, but died before him, killed at the Battle of Crecy.

== House of Joinville ==
Blazon of the House of Joinville

- 1348-1365 Henry V of Vaudémont (1327–1365) son of Anseau Joinville, Sire de Joinville (1265 -1343), and Marguerite of Vaudémont (1305–1333), herself daughter of Henry III of Vaudémont: married to Marie de Luxembourg, daughter of John of Luxembourg, Count of Ligny, and Alix de Dampierre
- 1365-1418 Margaret of Joinville (1354–1418), daughter of the previous count: first married in 1367 to John of Châlon, Lord of Montaigu (d. 1373): married for the second time in 1374 to Peter of Geneva (d.1392), Count of Geneva: married for the third time in 1393 to Frederick I, Count of Vaudémont (1368-1415)

== House of Lorraine-Vaudémont ==
Blazon of the House of Lorraine-Vaudémont

- 1393-1415 Frederick I, Count of Vaudémont (1368–1415), son of John I, Duke of Lorraine and Sophie of Wurtemberg
- 1415-1458 Antoine, Count of Vaudémont (1393–1458), son of the previous count: married in 1416 to Marie d'Harcourt (1398-1476), Countess Harcourt.
- 1458-1470 Frederick II, Count of Vaudémont (1428–1470), son of the previous count: married in 1444 to Yolande, daughter of René d'Anjou and heiress to the Duchy of Lorraine.
- 1470-1508 René II, Duke of Lorraine (1451–1508), son of the previous count, became Duke of Lorraine in 1473.

After this the title Count of Vaudémont was attached to the Duchy of Lorraine and was given to cadet members of the family:

- Louis, Count of Vaudémont, (1500–1528), son of René II
- Nicolas, Duke of Mercœur (1524–1577), Count of Vaudémont and later Duke of Mercœur, son of Antoine, Duke of Lorraine
- Francis II, Duke of Lorraine (1572–1632), Count of Vaudémont and subsequently Duke of Lorraine in 1625, son of Charles III, Duke of Lorraine
- Charles Henri, Prince of Commercy (1649–1723), later styled Prince of Vaudémont, son of Charles IV and Béatrice de Cuzance (the marriage was not recognised as valid in Canon Law).
- Charles Thomas, Prince of Vaudémont (1670–1704), son of the previous count.
- Joseph Louis, Prince of Lorraine-Vaudémont (1759–1812), younger brother of the Charles Eugene, Prince of Lambesc, given the courtesy title Prince of Vaudémont. His wife Louise de Montmorency-Logny (1763–1832) was a close friend of Talleyrand.

== Sources ==
- François, Michel. Histoire des comtes et du comté de Vaudémont des origines à 1473, Nancy, Imprimeries A. Humblot et Cie, 1935, 459
- Kibler, William W.; Zinn, Grover A., eds. (2011) [1995]. Medieval France: An Encyclopedia. New York and London: Routledge.
