= Simon IV of Saarbrücken =

Simon IV of Saarbrücken Simon IV. Graf von Saarbrücken
- Count of Saarbrücken; Seigneur of Commercy

Count of Saarbrücken
- Reign: 1276-1308

Seigneur of Commercy
- Reign: 1265-1297
- Born: b. 1247
- Died: 1308
- Spouse: 1. Élisabeth/Marguerite de Broyes-Commercy; 2. Mathilde/Mahaut de Sexfontaines
- Issue: Jean I of Saarbrücken-Commercy; Laure; Jeanne; Agnès
- House: House of Commercy
- Father: Simon III of Commercy
- Mother: Mathilde, Countess of Saarbrücken

Simon IV, Count of Saarbrücken, Simon of Saarbrücken-Commercy (born before 1247; dead 1308). He was the Count of Saarbrücken (de) and Seigneur (lord) of Commercy (fr).

== Biography ==
Simon was a son of Simon III? of Commercy (d.c. 1247) and grandson of Gaucher I (fr) (c.1185 - 1244/48), Seigneur of Broyes-Commercy, who was succeeded by Simon III's brother Gaucher II in Commercy, while Hugues, the elder brother of Gaucher I, had Broyes (fr) from their mother Agnès of Broyes (c.1175 - a. 1248). It is not clear if Simon III actually was a Seigneur of Commercy, but at least the title came to his descendants.

Simon's mother was Mathilde (c.1224 - 1276), Countess of Saarbrücken from 1270, daughter of Simon III (c. 1180–1243), Count of Saarbrücken with Lauretta of Upper Lorraine (1195 - a.1226). The County of Saarbrücken was given to the eldest sister Loretta (d.1270), with the others getting a share, but at her death the title went to Mathilde. As a widow Mathilde remarried in c.1248 to Amadeus (fr) (d. 1280), Seigneur (lord) of Montfaucon and had more children.

Simon's sister Laure (d. 1275), married Jean "the old" (1190–1267), Count of Chalon, Sire of Salins, regent of the County of Burgundy, and had several children, including Jean I of Châlon-Arlay.

Simon married twice and founded the House of Saarbrücken-Commercy (fr), having both fiefs as inheritance in 1274.

== Marriage and issue ==
In 1265 Simon married Elisabeth (or Marguerite?) of Broyes-Commercy (1248? - 1303?), daughter or granddaughter of his uncle Gaucher II of Broyes-Commercy (fr) (d. 1308), married to Marguerite of Bellevesvre (c. 1225 - a. 1308). These had two known children, Jeanne-Agnès (c. 1250 - b. 1324) and Marguerite who married Richard of Monnet.

Simon and his wife had one known child:

- Jean/Johann I (b. 1265 - 1341/42), who succeeded as Count of Saarbrücken. Jean also succeeded Simon as Seigneur of Commercy, already in 1297.
  - Jean married Mahaut/Mathilde of Aspremont, daughter of Gobert VII (fr) (d. 1279) and had possibly (records vary) the following children:
    - Simon (d. 1325), married 1309 Margarethe of Savoy (d. 1313), daughter of Louis I of Vaud. Their son was Johann/Jean II (c. 1310 - c. 1380), who succeeded Jean I in 1342, in Saarbrücken and 1326 in the part of Commercy called "Saarbrücken" or "Château bas" (as "Jean IV"), and married Ghislette of Bar (granddaughter of Theobald II, Count of Bar) and had one daughter, Johanna who married John I, Count of Nassau-Weilburg (1309 – 1371), and had several children. Formally she succeeded briefly as Countess of Saarbrücken, and as regent of Nassau-Weilburg.
    - Jeanne (d. 1375/76), married to Gerhard VII, Herr of Blankenheim (de) (1341 - 1377).
    - Marguerite, married to Louis III of Cossonay (fr) (d. 1394), Sire of Bercher, but with no children recorded.
    - Agnes (d.b. 1337), married to Simon II, Count of Zweibrücken (de) (d. 1311/12). They had two children.
    - Mahaut/Mathilde, married Johann III, Lord of Lichtenberg (fr) (d.c. 1324). Secondly she married 1334 to Simon I, Count of Salm (de) (d. 1346).
    - Pierre/Peter
    - Jean/Johann II of Commercy (fr) (d.b. 1344), Seigneur of the rest of the estate, "Château haut", Sire of Commercy and Venizy. In 1335 he married Alix, (c. 1310 - a. 1358), Dame of Venizy and Brequenay, daughter of Guillaume of Joinville (Briquenay) and Béatrice de Brienne, and had about seven children, including Jean III of Sarrebruck-Commercy (fr) (d.c. 1384).
  - Jean's second marriage with Marguerite, (d. 1342), Dame of Bosjean, daughter of Eudes V of Grancey rendered childless.

In 1269 Simon remarried, to Mathilde/Mahaut, (d. 1285), daughter of Simon III? of Sexfontaines (d.c. 1238) and Elisabeth of Jonvelle, daughter of Guy III of Jonvelle (d.a. 1175). They had three known children:

- Laure, (b. 1323), married in 1302 to Anseau of Joinville (fr) (1265 - 1343), son of Jean of Joinville (fr) (c. 1224 - 1317), and grandson of Simon, lord of Joinville (fr) (d. 1233) with Beatrix of Auxonne (fr) (1195 - 1261). They had one child:
  - Jeanne, Dame of Rimaucourt. She married twice, to Aubert VII of Hangest (fr) (d. 1338), Seigneur of Genlis, having one son that died as a child, and secondly Jean I of Noyers (1323-1361), Count of Joigny (fr). His son Jean II succeeded him.
- Johanna/Jeanne, (b. 1327), Dame de Bainville, married to Jacques of Vaudémont (d. 1299), Seigneur of Blainville and Bettingen, son of Henri I of Vaudémont (fr). Their daughter was:
  - Marguerite (d.c. 1344), who married firstly Johann of Salm (de) (d. 1313) and secondly (b. 1319) Guillaume of Vienne, Seigneur of Longwy and Bettingen (d.c. 1344).
- Agnès, (b. 1282 - b. 1349), married to Eberhard I, Herr of Zweibrücken-Bitsch (d.b. 1321), son of Heinrich II (de), Count of Zweibrücken. They had at least:
  - Simon I/II, of Herr of Zweibrücken-Bitsch [c. 1310 - c. 1355). He married Anna (Agnes) of Lichtenberg (c. 1329? - c. 1377), daughter of Johann ("Hannemann") II of Lichtenberg (fr) (1273? - 1366).

== Ancestry ==
Ancestors of Simon IV of Saarbrücken

Hugh III of Broyes, seigneur of Broyes and Commercy (c. 1125 - 1199)
Simon II, Seigneur of Broyes and Commercy (fr) (c. 1145 - a. 1208)
Stéphanie of Bar-Commercy (fr) (c. 1125 - b. 1178) daughter of Reginald I, Count of Bar
Gaucher I, Seigneur of Commercy (fr) (c. 1185 - 1244/48)
Renaud de Traves ? (d.a. 1157)
Nicole, Dame of Montrivel (Comté) and Châteauvillain (Jura) (c. 1160 - a. 1233); Probably missing generation from Humbert III of Salins (fr) (1075/80 - 1133)
Elisabeth of Salins ? daughter of Humbert III of Salins (fr)
Simon III ? of Commercy (d.c. 1247); Count of Saarbrücken, (Seigneur of Commercy ? 1246-48)
Henri of Fouvent (d. 1228)
Agnès (of Fouvent ?) (c. 1195 - b. 1248)
Hugh III of Broyes, seigneur of Broyes and Commercy (c. 1125 - 1199)
Agnès of Broyes (d. 1221)
Stéphanie of Bar-Commercy (fr) (c. 1125 - b. 1178) daughter of Reginald I, Count of Bar
Simon IV of Saarbrücken-Commercy; Count of Saarbrücken, Seigneur of Commercy
Simon I, Count of Saarbrücken (1120-1182)
Simon II, Count of Saarbrücken (de) (d. 1207)
Mathilda (Mechtild) of Sponheim ? (b.c. 1125) daughter of Meginhard I, Count of Sponheim (de)
Simon III, Count of Saarbrücken (c. 1180–1243)
Emich III ?, Count of Leiningen (d.c. 1180) ? relation exists, but is not clear, at least descendants of Emich II
Liutgard of Leiningen (d.a. 1239)
Elizabeth of Eberstein (b.1114 ?) ? wife of Emich III
Mathilde (c.1224-1276), Countess of Saarbrücken 1270-76
Frederick I, Duke of Lorraine (c. 1143 – 1206)
Frederick II, Duke of Lorraine (d. 1213)
Ludmilla of Piast (b. 1153 – b. 1223), daughter of Mieszko III the Old
Lauretta of Upper Lorraine (1195 - a. 1226)
Theobald I, Count of Bar (c. 1158- 1214)
Agnes of Bar (1177 - 1226)
Lauretta (Adelheid?) of Looz (d 1190) daughter of Ludwig I, Count of Looz (Loon)

== Notes ==
Simon IV of Saarbrücken House of Saarbrücken-Commercy
Regnal titles
Preceded by Mathilde	Count of Saarbrücken; 1276-1308	Succeeded by Jean/Johann I
Preceded by Gaucher II of Broyes-Commercy	Seigneur of Commercy; 1265-1297	Succeeded by Jean/Johann I
