= Adolph, Count of Nassau-Saarbrücken =

German ruler (1526–1559)

Adolph of Nassau-Saarbrücken
- Born: 22 August 1526; Saarbrücken
- Died: 26 November 1559 (aged 33)
- Noble family: House of Nassau
- Spouse: Anastasia of Isenburg-Grenzau
- Father: John Louis, Count of Nassau-Saarbrücken
- Mother: Catherine of Moers

Adolph of Nassau-Saarbrücken (Saarbrücken 22 August 1526 – 26 November 1559) was count of Saarbrücken and Saarwerden. He comes from the Walramian branch of the House of Nassau.

== Biography ==
Adolf was the fourth and youngest son of John Louis, Count of Nassau-Saarbrücken and his second wife, Catherine of Moers, daughter of John III, Count of Moers-Saarwerden and Anna van den Bergh.

In 1544 his father divided his belongings between his sons. Philip obtained the county of Saarbrücken. John and Adolph divided the rest. John obtained the lordships Ottweiler and Homburg. Adolph obtained, among others, the parts of the lordship Kirchheim that belonged to the counts of Saarbrücken. The county of Saarwerden remained joint property. Father John Louis retained a quarter of the income. After the death of the father on 18 June 1545, the division of the inheritance with his brothers was confirmed on 1 August 1545. Emperor Charles V confirmed the possession of the imperial fiefs and the brothers' heritage during his transit in Saarbrücken on 21 March 1546.

After the death of their brother Philip in 1554, John and Adolph inherited the county of Saarbrücken. They also obtained the fiefs of the house Nassau-Saarbrücken of the Bishopric of Metz. John and Adolph divided these possessions in 1556 on which occasion Adolph acquired the county of Saarwerden and the lordschip of Lahr.

Adolph introduced the Reformation in his county, probably in 1557. Introduced were the Augsburg Confession and the Church Order of Palatine Zweibrücken.

Adolph died on 26 November 1559, he was buried in Kirchheim.

== Marriage ==
Adolph married at Boppard on 28 August 1553 with Anastasia of Isenburg-Grenzau († Kirchheim, 26 January 1558), daughter of Henry, Count of Isenburg-Grenzau and Margaretha of Wertheim. Anastasia was buried in the church of Saint-Peter in Kirchheimbolanden. The marriage remained childless.

== Sources ==
- This article or an earlier version has been (partially) translated from the Dutch Wikipedia.
- Frank Becker, Zeittafel zur Geschichte des Saarbrücker Schlosses in: Gerhard Bungert & Charly Lehnert (Hg.), Das Saarbrücker Schloss. Zur Geschichte und Gegenwart, Lehnert Verlag, Saarbrücken, 1989, ISBN 3-926320-15-X.
- Wolfgang Behringer & Gabriele Clemens, Geschichte des Saarlandes, München, 2009.
- Michel Huberty, Alain Giraud, F. & B. Magdelaine, l’Allemagne Dynastique. Tome III Brunswick-Nassau-Schwarzbourg, Alain Giraud, Le Perreux, 1981.
- Friederich Köllner, Geschichte des vormaligen Nassau-Saarbrück'schen Landes und seiner Regenten, Teil 1, Saarbrücken, 1841.
- Albert Ruppersberg, Geschichte der Grafschaft Saarbrücken, Band 1, Saarbrücken, 2. Auflage, 1908 (reprint: Sankt Ingbert, 1979).
