= Anna Amalie of Baden-Durlach =

Anna Amalia of Baden-Durlach
- Born: 9 July 1595
- Died: 18 November 1651 (aged 56); Saarbrücken
- Noble family: Zähringen
- Spouse: William Louis, Count of Nassau-Saarbrücken
- Father: George Frederick, Margrave of Baden-Durlach
- Mother: Juliana Ursula of Salm-Neuville

Anna Amalia of Baden-Durlach (born: 9 July 1595; died: 18 November 1651 in Saarbrücken) was a Countess of Nassau-Saarbrücken by marriage to William Louis, Count of Nassau-Saarbrücken, and regent of Nassau-Saarbrücken during the minority of her son from 1640 to 1651.

== Life ==
She was a daughter of Margrave George Frederick of Baden-Durlach and his first wife, Countess Juliana Ursula of Salm-Neuville.

She married Count William Louis of Nassau-Saarbrücken in 1615.

Her children were legally minors when her husband died in 1640. She took up the regency, until her death. After her death, John Louis acted as regent for Gustav Adolph and Walrad until the inheritance was divided when they came of age in 1659.

== Issue ==
She had the following children:

- Anna Juliana (1617–1667), married Count Palatine Frederick of Zweibrücken
- Maurice
- Charlotte (1619–1687), married Louis Everhard of Leiningen-Westerburg
- Crato (1621–1642), succeeded William Louis as Count of Nassau-Saarbrücken; died in battle at Straelen
- Anna Amalia (1623–1695)
- John Louis (1625–1690), married in 1649 Countess Palatine Dorothea Catherine of Birkenfeld-Bischweiler
- Elisabeth Sybilla (1626–1627)
- Maria Sybilla (1628–1699), married August Philipp, Duke of Schleswig-Holstein-Sonderburg-Beck
- George Frederick (1630-1630)
- Gustav Adolph (1632–1677), married in 1662 Eleonora Clara of Hohenlohe-Neuenstein
- George Frederick (1633–1635)
- Walrad (1635–1702), married in 1678 Catherine Françoise of Croÿ-Roeulx

Anna Amalie of Baden-Durlach House of Zähringen Born: 9 July 1595 Died: 18 November 1651
Preceded by William Louis	Regent of Nassau-Saarbrücken; 1640-1651	Succeeded by John Louis
