= County of Nassau-Saarbrücken =

State of the Holy Roman Empire (1381–1797)

County of Nassau-Saarbrücken Grafschaft Nassau-Saarbrücken (German)
- 1381–1797
- Coat of arms

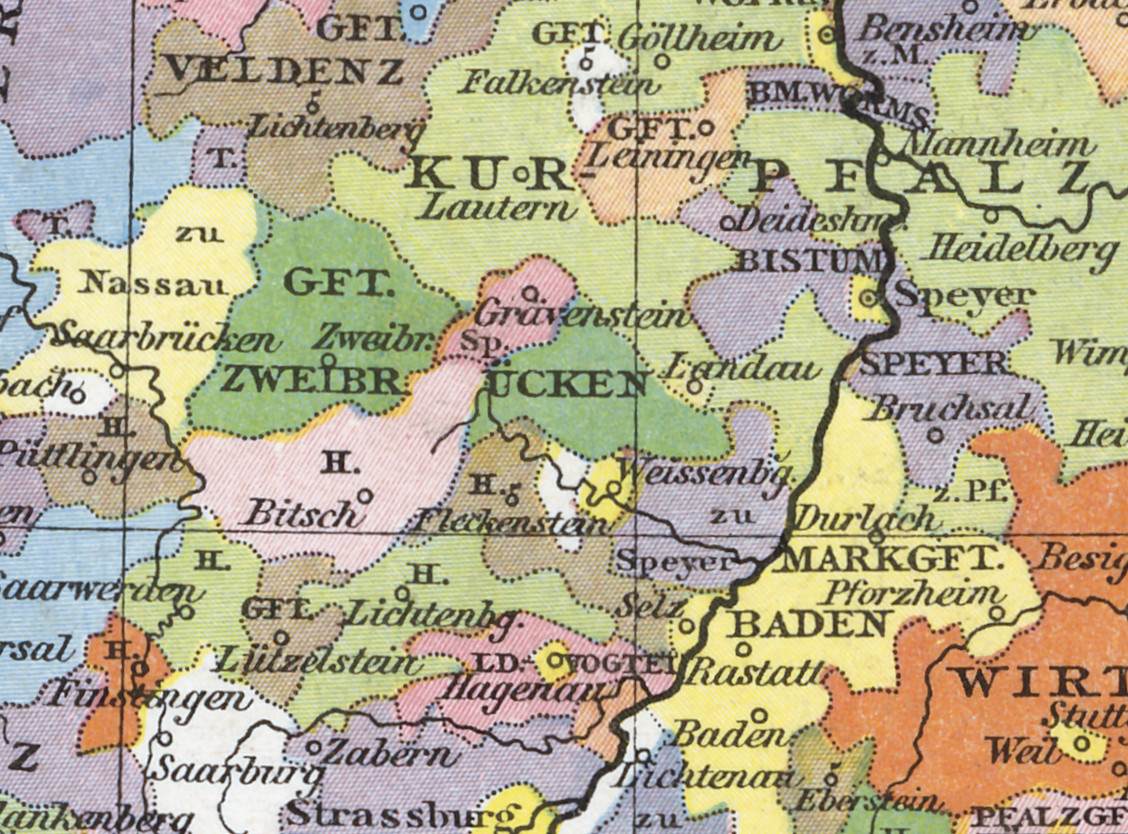
- County of Nassau-Saarbrücken (yellow, left), about 1400
- Status: County
- Capital: Saarbrücken
- Historical era: Middle Ages; Early modern period
  - Inherited by Nassau-Weilburg: 1381
  - Joined Upper Rhenish Circle: 1500
  - Held in personal union by Nassau-Weilburg: 1574–1627
  - Inherited by Nassau-Usingen: 1728
  - Annexed by France: 1797
Preceded by	Succeeded by
County of Saarbrücken	French First Republic

The County of Saarbrücken was an Imperial State in the Upper Lorraine region, with its capital at Saarbrücken. From 1381 it belonged to the Walram branch of the Rhenish House of Nassau.

== County of Saarbrücken ==
Coat of arms of the Counts of Saarbrücken

Around the year 1080 King Henry IV of Germany vested one Count Siegbert in the Saargau with the Carolingian Kaiserpfalz at Wadgassen on the Saar River and further possessions held by the Bishops of Metz in the Bliesgau as well as in the adjacent Alsace and Palatinate regions as a fiefdom.

In the course of the fierce Investiture Controversy, the rise of the comital dynasty continued with the appointment of Siegbert's son Adalbert as Archbishop of Mainz in 1111, and in 1118 his elder brother Frederick was first mentioned with the title of a "Count of Saarbrücken". However, Frederick's son Simon I had to face the slighting of his Saarbrücken residence by the forces of Emperor Frederick Barbarossa in 1168. Upon his death about 1183, the county was divided into two parts, when the Palatinate territories were separated to form the basis of the County of Zweibrücken. The Alsatian possessions had been lost already around 1120.

When the comital House of Leiningen became extinct in 1212, the Counts of Saarbrücken by jure uxoris inherited their Palatinate possessions around Altleiningen Castle, where they established the younger line of the Counts of Leiningen as a cadet branch. Simon III of Saarbrücken, count from 1207, was a loyal supporter of the Imperial House of Hohenstaufen and of Philip of Swabia. He later joined the Fifth Crusade and, as he had no male heirs, reached the acknowledgement of the inheritance by his daughter Laurette. His younger daughter Mathilda, who succeeded her sister in 1272, managed to secure her right of succession by marrying Count Simon of Commercy who from 1271 called himself Count of Saarbrücken-Commercy.

Saarbrücken received town privileges in 1322. Count John I, vassal of the dukes of Lorraine, joined the Luxembourg king Henry VII of Germany on his campaign to Italy and fought with Henry's son John of Bohemia on the French side in the Hundred Years' War. His grandson, the last Count John II of Saarbrücken, likewise fought with the French in the 1356 Battle of Poitiers, where he and King John II of France were captured and until the 1360 Treaty of Brétigny imprisoned at Wallingford Castle. Vested with the Lordship of Vaucouleurs as well with the title of a Grand Butler of France, he nevertheless had to pawn large parts of his possessions to Archbishop Baldwin of Trier. With John's death in 1381 the male line ended again. As his daughter Johanna had married Count John I of Nassau-Weilburg in 1353, their son Philipp I inherited the County of Saarbrücken.

== County of Nassau-Saarbrücken ==
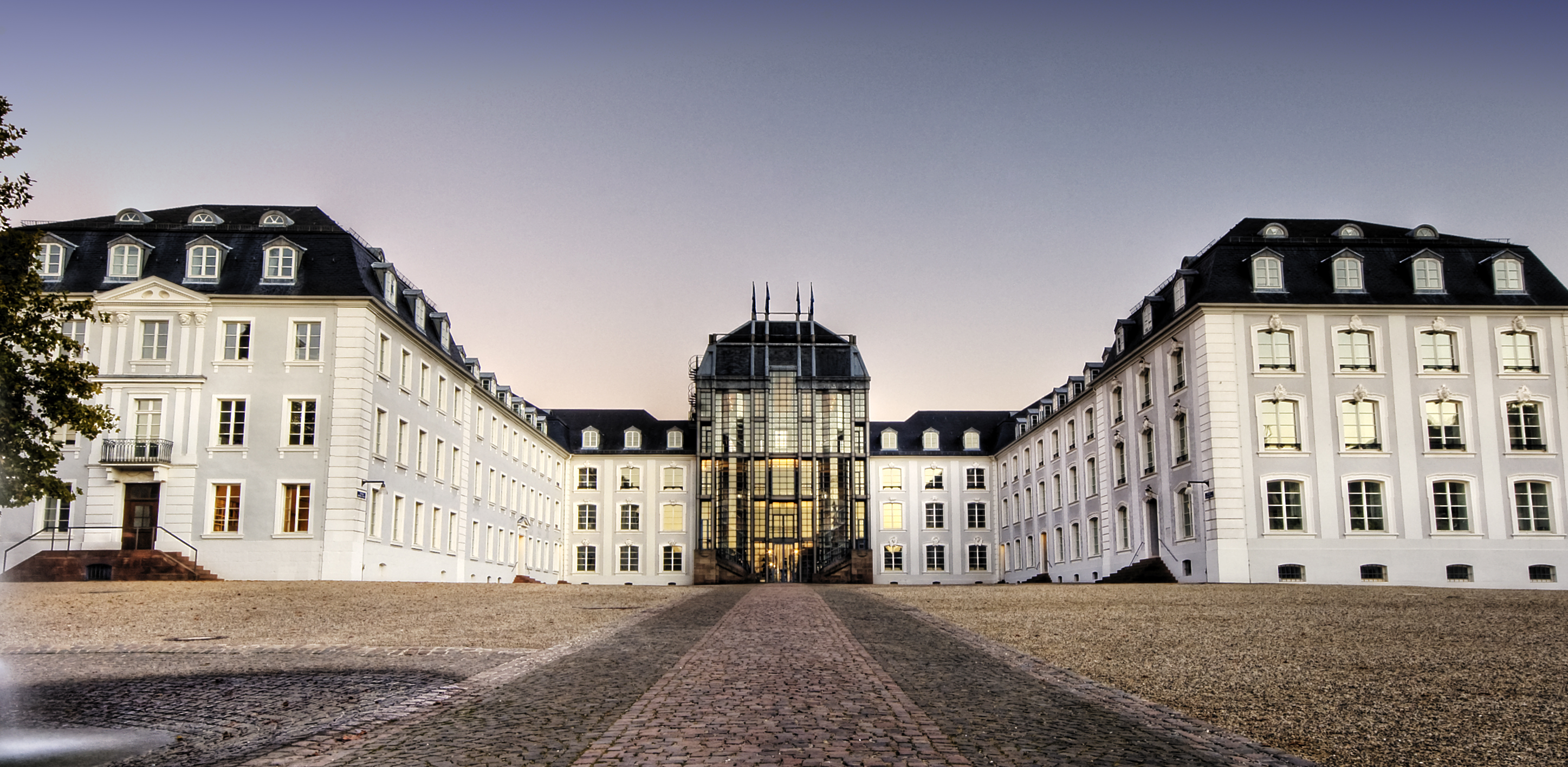
Saarbrücken Palace

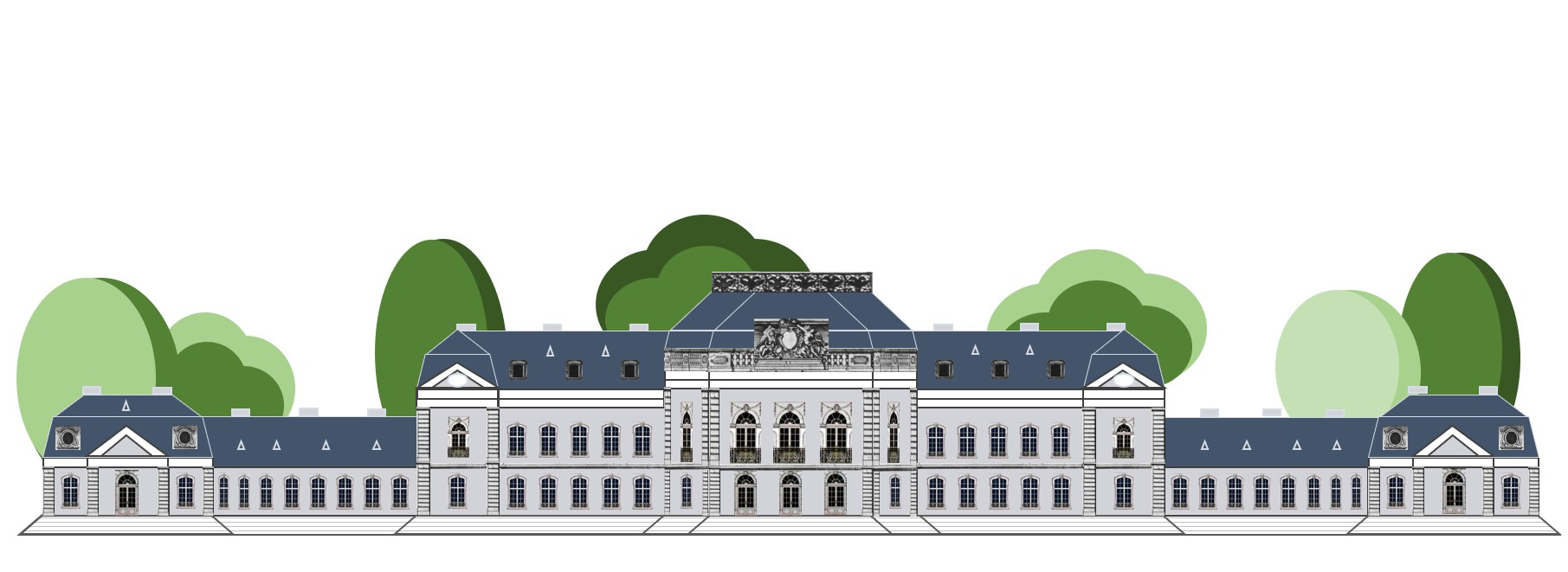
Schloss Jägersberg

Philipp I ruled both Nassau-Saarbrücken and Nassau-Weilburg and in 1393 inherited through his wife Johanna of Hohenlohe the lordships of Kirchheimbolanden and Stauf. He also received half of Nassau-Ottweiler (Lordship of Ottweiler) in 1393 and other territories later during his reign. After his death in 1429 the territories around Saarbrücken and along the Lahn were kept united until 1442, when they were again divided among his sons into the lines Nassau-Saarbrücken (west of the Rhine) and Nassau-Weilburg (east of the Rhine), the so-called Younger line of Nassau-Weilburg.

In 1507 Count John Ludwig I significantly enlarged his territory by marrying Catharine, the daughter of the last Count of Moers-Saarwerden and in 1527 inherited the County of Saarwerden including the Lordship of Lahr. Though after his death in 1544 the county was split into three parts, the three lines (Ottweiler, Saarbrücken proper and Kirchheim) were all extinct in 1574 and all of Nassau-Saarbrücken was united with Nassau-Weilburg until 1629. This new division however was not executed until the Thirty Years' War was over and in 1651 three counties were established: Nassau-Idstein, Nassau-Weilburg and Nassau-Saarbrücken.

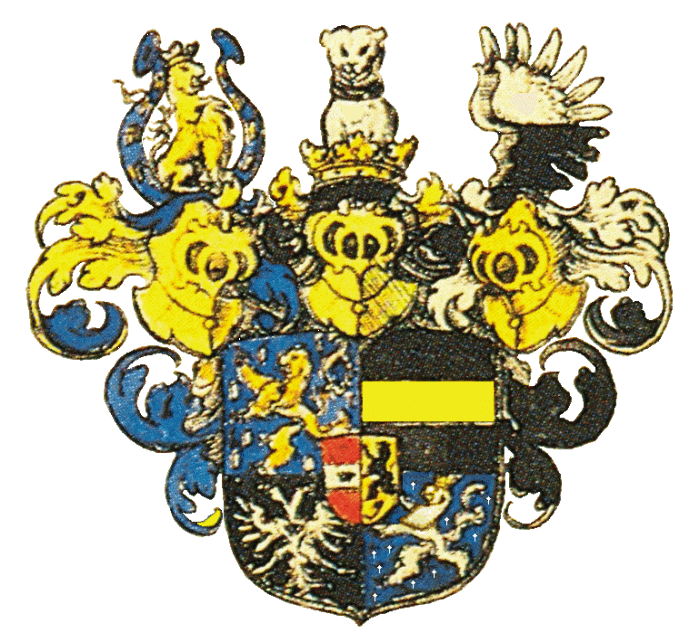
The coat of arms of Nassau-Saarbrücken.

Only eight years later, Nassau-Saarbrücken was again divided into:

- Nassau-Saarbrücken proper; fell to Nassau-Ottweiler in 1723
- Nassau-Ottweiler; fell to Nassau-Usingen in 1728
- Nassau-Usingen

By 1728 Nassau-Saarbrücken was united with Nassau-Usingen which had inherited Nassau-Ottweiler and Nassau-Idstein. In 1735 Nassau-Usingen was divided again into Nassau-Usingen and Nassau-Saarbrücken. In 1793 the territories of Nassau-Saarbrücken were occupied (along with the rest of the Left Bank of the Rhine) by the French First Republic; in 1797 Saarbrücken was annexed to the Sarre department.

In 1797 the Nassau-Saarbrücken title was inherited by Nassau-Usingen; it was (re-)unified with Nassau-Weilburg and raised to the Duchy of Nassau in 1806. The first Duke of Nassau was Frederick August of Nassau-Usingen who died in 1816. He was succeeded by Wilhelm, Prince of Nassau-Weilburg. In 1815, after the Napoleonic Wars, most of the former territory of Nassau-Saarbrücken became part of the Prussian Grand Duchy of the Lower Rhine, then the Rhine Province in 1822; it mostly corresponded to the Saarbrücken district.

The coat of arms combined the lion of the counts of the Saargau with the crosses of the house of Commercy, and was used when the coat of arms of Saarland was created.

== Possessions in 1797 ==
- The Principality of Saarbrücken
- County of Ottweiler
- Some villages of the Abbey Wadgassen
- Two-thirds of the County Saarwerden (the bailiwick of Harskirchen, the rest owned by Nassau-Weilburg)

== Rulers ==
House of Leiningen

- 1080–1105 Siegbert
- 1105–1135 Frederick
- 1135–1182 Simon I
- 1182–1207 Simon II
- 1207–1245 Simon III
- 1245–1271 Lauretta
- 1271–1274 Mathilde

House of Broyes-Commercy

- 1271–1308 Simon IV
- 1308–1342 John I
- 1342–1381 John II
- 1381–1381 Joan

House of Nassau

Reign	Name	Born	Died	Family/Relationship to previous ruler
1381-1429	Philip I	1368	2 July 1429	son
1429/42-1472	John II	4 April 1423	25 July 1472	son
1472-1545	John Louis	19 October 1472	4 June 1545	son
1545-1554	Philip II	25 July 1509	19 June 1554	son
1554-1574	John III	5 April 1511	23 November 1574	brother
1574-1602	Philip IV	14 October 1542	12 March 1602	son of Philip III of Nassau-Weilburg
1602-1627	Louis II	9 August 1565	8 November 1627	brother's son
1625/7-1640	William Louis	18 December 1590	22 August 1640	son
1640-1642	Crato	7 November 1621	14 July 1642	son
1642-1659	John Louis	24 May 1625	9 February 1690	brother
1642-1677	Gustav Adolph	27 March 1632	9 October 1677	brother
1677-1713	Louis Crato	28 March 1663	14 February 1713	son
1713-1723	Charles Louis	6 January 1665	6 December 1723	brother
1723-1728	Frederick Louis	3 November 1651	25 May 1728	son of John Louis
1728-1735	Charles	31 December 1712	21 June 1775	son of William Henry I of Nassau-Usingen, second cousin of Frederick Louis
1735/42-1768	William Henry II	6 March 1718	24 July 1768	brother
1768-1794	Louis	3 January 1745	2 March 1794	son
1794-1797	Henry	9 March 1768	27 April 1797	son

== See also ==
- House of Nassau
- Duchy of Nassau
- House of Nassau-Weilburg

== Sources ==
- The Dutch Nassau-Saarbrücken and the German Nassau-Saarbrücken Wikipedia articles
- The divisions of the House of Nassau chart
- Sante, Wilhelm. Geschichte der Deutschen Länder - Territorien-Ploetz. Würzburg 1964.
- Köbler, Gerhard. Historisches Lexikon der Deutschen Länder. München 1988.
