= Simon III of Saarbrücken =

- Count of Saarbrücken; Graf von Saarbrücken

Count of Saarbrücken
- Reign: 1207-1243
- Born: b. 1180
- Died: c. 1240
- Spouse: Lauretta of Upper Lorraine
- Issue: Dietrich; Johanna; Loretta, Countess of Saarbrücken; Elisabeth; Mathilde, Countess of Saarbrücken
- House: House of Saarbrücken
- Father: Simon II, Count of Saarbrücken
- Mother: Liutgard of Leiningen

Simon III of Sarrebrück, Simon III von Saarbrücken (Saarbrücken-Leiningen) (c. 1180–1243) was the Count of Saarbrücken (de) from 1207 until his death, about 1240.

== Background ==
Simon III was the eldest son of Simon II (de) (d.1207), Count of Saarbrücken (in office 1183–1207) and Count jure uxoris of Leiningen, and his wife Liutgard of Leiningen (d.a. 1239), who was daughter, sister, cousin or aunt of Emich III? (d. 1180/87 or c.1208), Count of Leiningen. When Liutgard's relative Friedrich (First cousin of Emich III) died c. 1215, she inherited the County of Leiningen. Simon II and his younger brother Heinrich (de) (d. 1228) got a share each of their father Simon's County of Saarbrücken, with Heinrich's part called County of Zweibrücken.

Simon III's younger brother Friedrich III, "Frederick" (d. 1237), inherited the County of Leiningen, and founded "the younger House of Leiningen". His brother Heinrich (de) (d. 1234) was a Bishop of Worms. They belonged to the House of Saarbrücken and related to the "Walramids" (de), descendants of Siegbert and Frederick, Count of Saarbrücken, who was the father-in-law of Frederick II, Duke of Swabia.

In the struggle about the power in the Holy Roman Empire 1208–1215, he sided with the Hohenstaufen. He recognised however Otto of Braunschweig (1175-1218) as the King of Germany, but attended the crowning of Frederick II, Holy Roman Emperor in 1215 when Otto had to abdicate.

Simon III was a participant in the Fifth Crusade 1217–1219. He acted there as leader in operations in front of Damietta in 1218.

== Marriage and issue ==
According to a doubtful source Simon III married Gertrude of Dagsburg/Dachsburg (c.1190 - 1225) as her third husband. She was the daughter of Gertrude of Baden (b.1160 – 1225) and Albert II, Count of Dagsburg, and heiress of the County of Dagsburg. It is more likely that it was Simon's nephew, Simon of Leiningen (c. 1205 - 1234/36), son of Friedrich (d. 1237), that married Gertrude in 1224, and became count jure uxoris of Dagsburg in 1234, but was heirless. The line of Dagsburg-Leiningen (de) continued on Friedrich's side, with Simon's brother Friedrich IV (d. 1249/1254).

In 1215/20 Simon then married Lauretta of Upper Lorraine (1195 - a.1226), daughter of "Ferry". Frederick II, Duke of Lorraine with whom he had five children:

- Dietrich (d.b. 12 May 1227), married to Johanna of Aspremont (d.a. 1227). Her parentage is not clear, probably was she from a cadet branch of the Aspremont (fr). No record of children, inheritance went to his sister.
- Laure, "Loretta", "Laurette" (d.a. 13 November 1270). She succeeded Simon as the Countess of Saarbrücken and married Gottfried/Geoffroi II of Aspremont (de) (d. 1250), son of Gobert VI of Apremont (de) and secondly in 1252 to Dietrich I Luf of Cleves (de) (c.1228 - 1277), a junior son of Dietrich V (?), Count of Cleves (1185 - 1260). Both husbands entered as counts jure uxoris from 1243 to 1259 when Dietrich turned back to Cleves (Kleve). Loretta and Dietrich had a young daughter, Richardis (d.a. 1326), that was not yet married, and Loretta let her sister Mathilde inherit the county. Richardis married 1285 to Gerlach II (d.b. 1325) Herr of Dollendorf and Kronenburg, probably son of Gerlach I of Dollendorf, and they had at least one child.
- Johanna (d.b. 1286), married to Simon V (or VI?) (d. 1280), Seigneur (lord) of Clefmont-en-Bassigny (fr). They had children.
- Elisabeth (d.a. 1271), married to Hugo III Count of Lützelstein (and Lunéville ?) (d.a. 1280).
- Mathilde (c.1224 - 1276), succeeded Laure as the Countess of Saarbrücken in 1270.
  - She married Simon III? of Commercy (d.c. 1247), son of Gaucher I (fr) (c.1185 - 1244/48), Seigneur of Broyes-Commercy, who was succeeded by Simon's brother Gaucher II in Commercy, while Hugues, the elder brother of Gaucher I, had had Broyes from their mother Agnès of Broyes (c.1175 - a. 1248). It is not clear if Simon actually was a Seigneur of Commercy, but at least the title came to his descendants.
    - Simon IV, Count of Saarbrücken (b.1247 - 1308). He married twice and founded the House of Saarbrücken-Commercy (fr), having both fiefs as inheritance in 1274. His son Jean I (fr) (b 1265 - 1341/42), succeeded as Count of Saarbrücken. Jean also succeeded Simon IV as Seigneur of Commercy in 1297.
    - Jaquemin of Saarbrücken, a cleric.
    - Friedrich, "Frederick", Seigneur of Commercy (fr) ?.
    - Laure (d. 1275), married Jean "the old" (1190 – 1267), Count of Chalon, Sire of Salins, regent of the County of Burgundy, and had several children, including Jean I of Châlon-Arlay.
  - As a widow Mathilde married in c.1248 to Amadeus (fr) (d. 1280), Seigneur (lord) of Montfaucon, and had:
    - Jean (fr) (d. 1306), Seigneur of Montfaucon, Orbe and Échallens. He married twice, to Marguerite of Châteauvillain, (d. 1297), and Isabeau of Melun, but without issue.
    - Gauthier II (fr) (c. 1250 - 1309), Seigneur of Vuillafans-le-Vieux, later Seigneur of Montfaucon. Me married Mathilde (Mahaut) of Chaussin, Dame of La Marche and had about six children, including Henry I, Count of Montbéliard.
    - Agnès (d. 1278), married to Aymon II, Count of Geneva (d. 1280). They had two daughters.

After the death of his son Dietrich in 1227, he chose Laurette as his heiress as Countess of Saarbrücken, with an official statement in 1235 with the Bishop of Metz, and gave a part of the county to each of the daughters (mentioning "Joffroi d´Aspremont, Lorate, Mahaus & Jehane"). Mathilde gained the title as Countess of Saarbrücken, but the inheritance was contended by Bishop Lorenz von Leistenberg, and first Mathilde's son Simon IV could safeguard their reign after her death, and the House of Saarbrücken-Commercy prevailed until 1381, when the male line became extinct.

== Ancestry ==
Ancestors of Simon III of Saarbrücken

Siegbert (b.c.1040 ?), Count of Saarbrücken and more?
Friedrich, Count of Saarbrücken (d.1135)
Simon I, Count of Saarbrücken (1120-1182)
Theodoric II, Duke of Lorraine (d. 1115)
Gisela of Lorraine (b.c. 1100)
Gertrude of Flanders, Duchess of Lorraine (1080–1117)
Simon II, Count of Saarbrücken (de) (d. 1207)
Stephen II, Count of Sponheim (d.c.1100)
Meginhard I, Count of Sponheim (de) (c.1090-c.1140)
Sophia of Hamm? (Formbach) (de) (d.c. 1100)
Mathilda (Mechtild) of Sponheim ? (b.c.1125)
Adalbert, Count of Mörsburg (de) (d.c.1125)
Mechtilde of Mörsburg (b.c.1100)
Mechtild of Bar-le-Duc
Simon III; Count of Saarbrücken
Emich I ?, Count of Leiningen (fl. 1130)
Emich II ?, Count of Leiningen (d.c. 1180) father or grandfather of Emich III
Emich III ?, Count of Leiningen (d.c. 1180) ? relation exists, but is not clear, at least descendants of Emich II
Elisa (d.a. 1179) wife of Emich II
Liutgard of Leiningen (d.a. 1239)
Elisabeth of Eberstein (b.1114 ?) ? wife of Emich III

== Notes ==
Simon III of Saarbrücken House of Saarbrücken
Regnal titles
Preceded by Simon II	Count of Saarbrücken; 1207-1243	Succeeded by Laure
