= Mathilde of Saarbrücken =

- Count of Saarbrücken; Graf von Saarbrücken

Count of Saarbrücken
- Reign: 1271-1274
- Died: c. 1274
- House: House of Saarbrücken
- Father: Simon III, Count of Saarbrücken
- Mother: Lauretta of Upper Lorraine

Mathilde of Saarbrücken (1224-1276), was a sovereign countess regnant of Saarbrücken from 1271 to 1276.

She was the youngest daughter of Simon III, Count of Saarbrücken, who was succeeded upon his death by her sister Lauretta. Lauretta had one daughter and one son, but as both died early, she was succeeded by her younger sister, Mathilde. She married Simon III? of Commercy (d.c. 1247), son of Gaucher I (fr) (c.1185 - 1244/48), Seigneur of Broyes-Commercy. It is not clear if Simon actually was a Seigneur of Commercy, but at least the title came to his descendants. As a widow Mathilde married in c.1248 to Amadeus (fr) (d. 1280), Seigneur (lord) of Montfaucon.

== Issue ==
- Simon IV, Count of Saarbrücken (b.1247 - 1308). He married twice and founded the House of Saarbrücken-Commercy (fr), having both fiefs as inheritance in 1274. His son Jean I (fr) (b 1265 - 1341/42), succeeded as Count of Saarbrücken. Jean also succeeded Simon IV as Seigneur of Commercy in 1297.
- Jaquemin of Saarbrücken, a cleric.
- Friedrich, "Frederick", Seigneur of Commercy (fr) ?.
- Laure (d. 1275), married Jean "the old" (1190 – 1267), Count of Chalon, Sire of Salins, regent of the County of Burgundy.
- Jean (fr) (d. 1306), Seigneur of Montfaucon, Orbe and Échallens.
- Gauthier II (fr) (c. 1250 - 1309), Seigneur of Vuillafans-le-Vieux, later Seigneur of Montfaucon. Me married Mathilde (Mahaut) of Chaussin, Dame of La Marche.
- Agnès (d. 1278), married to Aymon II, Count of Geneva (d. 1280).

== Notes ==
Mathilde of Saarbrücken House of Saarbrücken
Regnal titles
Preceded by Lauretta	Countess of Saarbrücken; 1271-1276	Succeeded by Simon IV
