= John II of Saarbrücken =

John II, Count of Saarbrücken Johann II. Graf von Saarbrücken
- Count of Saarbrücken; Seigneur of Commercy

Count of Saarbrücken
- Reign: 1342–1381

Seigneur of Commercy
- Reign: 1326-1381
- Born: c. 1310
- Died: 11 March 1381
- Spouse: Ghislette of Bar
- Issue: Johanna of Saarbrücken
- House: House of Saarbrücken-Commercy
- Father: Simon of Saarbrücken-Commercy
- Mother: Margaret of Savoy

John II of Saarbrücken, Jean II de Sarrebruck, Johann II von Saarbrücken (circa 1310 – 11 March 1381). He was the Count of Saarbrücken (de) and Seigneur (lord) of Commercy (fr), as Jean IV of Saarbrücken-Commercy, part "Château bas".

== Life ==
John was the son of Simon of Saarbrücken-Commercy (d. 1325), son of John I (fr) (b. 1265 - 1341/42), Count of Saarbrücken. His mother was Marguerite of Savoy-Vaud (d. 1313), a daughter of Louis I of Vaud, married with Simon in 1309.

1326, before the death of John II's grandfather, Count John I, the inheritance was divided. John was awarded the County of Saarbrücken and a small part of Commercy, called "Saarbrücken" or "Château bas". The larger part of Commercy, called "Château haut", went to his uncle John II (Jean II) (fr), as "Seigneur of Commercy", of the house of Saarbrücken-Commercy. One of his sons was Jean III.

Like his father Simon, John II supported France in the war against England. During the Battle of Poitiers 1356, both John II and King John II of France were taken prisoner by the English. He was held in Wallingford Castle until 1360.

In 1362, he fought against gangs of mercenaries near Lyon and was briefly taken prisoner again. John II undertook several diplomatic missions in the service of the French King. In 1362, he travelled to the court of Emperor Charles IV and in the following years, he travelled to the English court several times. In 1364, he was appointed Grand Butler of France as a reward for his services. In 1370 John was appointed chairman of the Court of Finances. In 1371, he received the Lordship of Vaucouleurs.

In 1380, John II retired from the French court. He died in 1381. As he had no sons, his daughter Johanna inherited the County of Saarbrücken. However, she died later that year, and the county fell to her son Philipp I of Nassau-Weilburg. Various lines of the House of Nassau would hold the county until it was conquered by France in 1795.

== Marriage and issue ==
Latest in 1334, John II married Ghislette (d. 1356/62), a daughter of Peter of Bar (d.c. 1348), Lord of Pierrefort, son of Theobald II, Count of Bar. Ghiselette's mother was Jeanne of Vienne (d.b. 1326), daughter of Hugues of Vienne (d. 1307?), Sire of Longwy and Pagny (or Philipp I, Count of Vianden?). John and Ghislette had one daughter:

- Johanna (d. 1381), married in 1353 to John I, Count of Nassau-Weilburg (1309 – 1371), and had several children as follows. Formally she succeeded briefly as Countess of Saarbrücken, and as regent of Nassau-Weilburg for her young son, and the House of Nassau-Saarbrücken followed, with their son:
  - Philipp I, Count of Nassau-Saarbrücken-Weilburg (1368 – 1429), who ruled both the County of Nassau-Weilburg and the County of Saarbrücken. He married Anna of Hohenlohe-Weikersheim (d. 1410), and Elisabeth of Lorraine-Vaudémont (c. 1395 – 1456) and had several children. At Philipps death in 1429, the counties were ruled jointly by his eldest sons, with their mother Elisabeth as regent until 1442, then it was divided between them:
    - Philip II of Nassau-Weilburg (1418 – 1492), Count and founder of the line Nassau-Weilburg. At his majority in 1438 he began ruling in collaboration with his mother.
    - Johann II of Nassau-Saarbrücken, aka Jean/John II/III, (1423 - 1472), Count and founder of the line Nassau-Saarbrücken. In 1444 he sold the Seigneurie of Commercy "Château-Bas" to Louis of Lorraine (fr) (1427 - 1445), marquis Pont-à-Mousson, son of King René of Anjou (1409 - 1480), who inherited the property from his son.
  - Johann (d. October 6, 1365) and
  - Johannette (d. October 6, 1365), twins
  - Johanna (1362-1383), married in Kassel in 1377 to Hermann II, Landgrave of Hesse (ca. 1342 – June 10, 1413). Johanna died on January 1, 1383, in Marburg.
  - Agnes (d. 1401), married in 1382 to Count Simon III Wecker of Zweibrücken-Bitsch (d. 1401)
  - Schonette (d. 1436), married in 1384 to Heinrich X. von Homburg (d. 1409), married in 1414 to Otto II, Duke of Brunswick-Osterode (1396-1452)
  - Margarete (d. 1427), married ca. 1393 to Frederick III, Count of Veldenz (d. 1444)

== Ancestry ==
Ancestors of John II of Saarbrücken

Simon III ? of Commercy (fr) (d.c. 1247) son of Gaucher I of Broyes-Commercy (fr)
Simon IV of Saarbrücken-Commercy (b. 1247 - 1308); Count of Saarbrücken, Seigneur of Commercy
Mathilde, Countess of Saarbrücken (c.1224-1276) daughter of Simon III, Count of Saarbrücken
Jean I of Saarbrücken-Commercy (fr) (c. 1260 - 1341/42); Count of Saarbrücken, Seigneur of Commercy
ancestry with Gaucher II, Seigneur of Commercy (fr) (d. 1308)
Elisabeth/Marguerite ? of Broyes-Commercy
Simon of Saarbrücken-Commercy (d. 1325)
Gobert VI (fr) (d.c. 1239)
Gobert VII (fr) (c. 1223 - 1279)
Julienne of Rosoy (d.a. 1251) daughter of Roger of Rosoy
Mahaut of Aspremont
Thomas II of Coucy-Vervins (d. 1252/1253) son of Ralph I, Lord of Coucy
Agnès of Coucy (1226? - 1277?)
Mahaut of Rethel (d.a. 1255) daughter of Hugh II, Count of Rethel
John II, Count of Saarbrücken; Seigneur of Commercy "Château bas"
Thomas I, Count of Savoy (1178 – 1233)
Thomas II of Piedmont (c.1199 - 1259); Lord of Piedmont, Count of Flanders & Hainaut jure uxoris, regent of Savoy
Margaret (Beatrix) of Geneva (c. 1280 - d. 1252)
Louis I of Savoy (1249/50 - c. 1302); Baron of Vaud
Teodoro (Tedesio) III Fieschi, Count of Lavagna (c. 1180 - b. 1248)
Beatrice Fieschi (fr) (1225 - 1283)
Simone della Volta (1204 - 1248 ?) or Vigolan of Capo-Corso
Margaret of Savoy (d. 1313)
Philip of Montfort, Lord of Tyre (1206 - 1270)
Philip II of Montfort, Lord of Castres (d. 1270)
Eleonore of Courtenay (1208 - b. 1230) daughter of Peter II of Courtenay
Jeanne of Montfort-Chambéon (fr) (1250 - 1300 ?),
Guy I of Lévis, Lord of Mirepoix (d. 1233)
Jeanne de Levis-Mirepoix
Guibourge of Montfort (d.a. 1234)

John II of Saarbrücken House of Commercy Born: circa 1325 Died: 11 March 1381
Preceded by Jean I of Saarbrücken-Commercy	Count of Saarbrücken; 1342–1381	Succeeded by Johanna
Preceded by Jean I of Saarbrücken-Commercy	Seigneur of Commercy "Château bas", as Jean IV; 1326-1381	Succeeded by Johanna
