= Leiningen-Westerburg =

State of the Holy Roman Empire

- 1457–1547
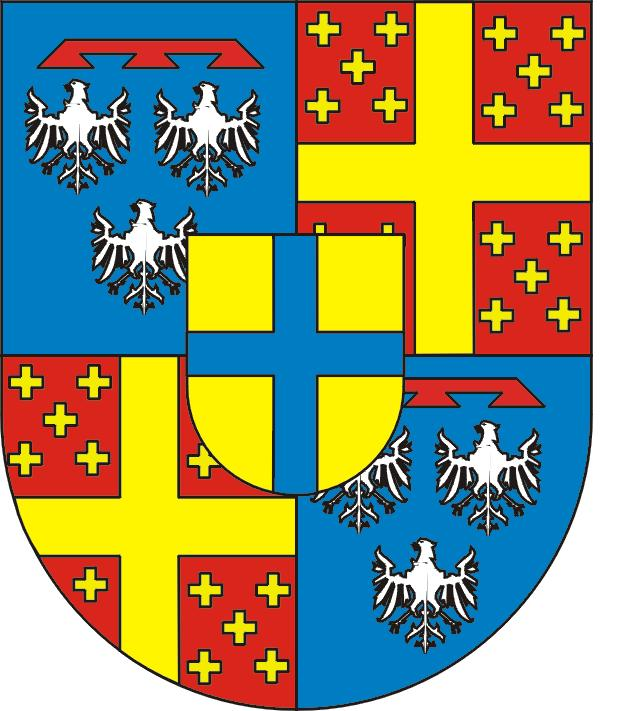
- Coat of arms
- Capital: Leiningen
- History
  - Union of Leiningen and Westerburg: 1457
  - Divided into Westerburg-Leiningen-Leiningen and Westerburg-Leiningen-Westerburg: 1547

Leiningen-Westerburg was a historic state of the Holy Roman Empire, located in the vicinity of Leiningen and Westerburg in what is now the German state of Rhineland-Palatinate.

Leiningen-Westerburg was formed in 1467, when the last Landgrave of Leiningen died childless and Leiningen passed to his sister Margaret, who was married to Reinhard III of Westerburg. Reinhard's grandson moved his capital to Leiningen in 1481 and began styling himself Reinhard I of Westerburg-Leiningen.

== See also ==
- Barony of Westerburg
- County of Leiningen
