= William Louis, Count of Nassau-Saarbrücken =

German noble

- Coat of arms of William Louis shows the arms of counties of Nassau, Moers, Will Saar, Saarbrücken and in the heart the shield of Lahr-Mahlberg
- Born: 18 December 1590; Ottweiler
- Died: 22 August 1640 (aged 49); Metz
- Noble family: Nassau
- Spouse: Countess Anna Amalia of Baden-Durlach
- Father: Louis II, Count of Nassau-Weilburg
- Mother: Anna Maria of Hesse-Kassel

William Louis of Nassau-Saarbrücken (18 December 1590, Ottweiler – 22 August 1640, Metz), was a Count of Saarbrücken.

== Life ==
His parents were Louis II of Nassau-Weilburg (died: 8 November 1627 in Saarbrücken) and Landgravine Anna Maria of Hesse-Kassel (1567–1626). His father had in 1605 re-united all the possessions of the Walram line of the House of Nassau.

After his education at Metz from 1609 to 1614 he made a Grand Tour of France, the Netherlands and England.

In 1616 William Louis became co-regent with his father. His father died in 1627 and he became guardian of his two youngest brothers, Otto and Ernest Casimir. On 29 January 1629 in Ottweiler, the inheritance was split and William Louis received the County of Saarbrücken, the herrschaft of Ottweiler, the Bailiwick of Herbitzheim, and the Community of Saarwellingen. His brother John received Idstein, Wiesbaden and Sonnenberg. William Louis remained Regent of Wehen and the district of Burgschwalbach, the territories of his two youngest brothers, as they were still minors.

Shortly thereafter, on 2 March 1629, Emperor Ferdinand II issued the Edict of Restitution, by which church property that had been confiscated after 1552 under the Peace of Passau, was returned to its previous owner. Based on this Edict, the Prince Bishops of Mainz and Trier claimed substantial parts of the possessions of the Nassau brothers. The Court of Appeal ruled on 7 July 1629 in a dispute between Lorraine and Nassau, that the city and county of Saarwerden and Bockenheim and Wieberstweiler were fiefs of Metz and should therefore be returned to Lorraine, and the Nassau family could keep the rest of their county. The Duke of Lorraine, however, took possession of the whole of the County of Saarwerden and the Lordship of Herbitzheim. William Louis appealed, and his appeal was acknowledged on 27 July 1630 by Superintendent Abraham Staymle at Strasbourg. William Louis took the case to the Imperial Council of Princes in Regensburg and demanded the imperial investiture on 23 July 1631 (although he had refused to join the Catholic League, or to provide troops). Late in 1631, King Gustavus Adolphus of Sweden and his army arrived at the Rhine. William Louis and his brothers joined him, thereby declaring war on the Emperor. William Louis himself served as a lieutenant colonel in the cavalry regiment of Rhinegrave Otto Louis of Salm-Kyrburg-Mörchingen and fought with them in the Upper Rhine Valley.

King Gustavus Adolphus was killed on 16 November 1632 (6 November according to the Julian Calendar which was still used in Sweden at the time). The Protestant estates then met in Heilbronn. At this meeting, the three Nassau brothers joined the Swedish side, which was led by chancellor Axel Oxenstierna. The youngest brother, Count Otto, died on 26 November 1632 and on 11 December Count Ernest Casimir came of age. The Nassau territories were divided anew. Ernest Casimir chose the districts of Weilburg, Gleiberg, Mehrenberg and the districts of Kirchheim and Stauf, that had previously belonged to Otto. The district of Usingen and the Lordship of Stockheim were divided.

In August 1633, the Swedish army attacked form the Alsace into the County of Saarwerden, which was still occupied by Lorraine. The county was conquered, but not given back to the Nassaus. On 5 September 1633, their representative Count John of Nassau-Idstein, signed an alliance with France against the Emperor.

In March 1634 William Louis was at the meeting in Frankfurt, where Oxenstierna tried to win over the Electors of Saxony and Brandenburg to join the Heilbronn League. Here, the Nassau brothers also reached a compromise with the Lords of Geroldseck about the ownership rights to Lahr. On 7 June William Louis sealed the alliance with France. The negotiations in Frankfurt came to an abrupt end when Emperor Ferdinand II won the Battle of Nördlingen on 6 September 1634. As the imperial army of the Middle Rhine approached, the counts brought their archives to a secure place in Frankfurt and then proceeded to Kirchheim. They had to give up their possessions of the right bank of the Rhine.

After the death of Rhinegrave Otto Louis, William Louis entered the service of Duke Bernard of Saxe-Weimar. They launched a campaign to Wetterau and attacked a division of the Imperial General Count von Mansfeld at Michelstadt on the 24 December 1634

In 1635, he returned to Frankfurt to attend a meeting of the Protestant states and their allies. At this meeting, it was decided that Sweden would return Saarwerden to the Nassaus. On 23 April 1635 the family fled to Bockenheim, where the counties of Nassau-Saarbrücken and Saarwerden should have been handed over. However, on 30 May 1635 a number of imperial estates, including the Electorates of Brandenburg and Saxony, had concluded the Peace of Prague and the Nassau Counts were expressly excluded from this agreement. They then went to Saarbrücken, which was defended by Bernard of Saxe-Weimar. Bernard was defeated in August 1635 during an attack on Frankfurt and had to retreat to Metz. William Louis and Ernest joined him; John chose to go into exile in Strasbourg. However, a panic broke out in Saarbrücken as the Imperial troops under Matthias Gallas approached and a large number of people tried to flee. The count's family decided that under the circumstance, Strasbourg was too far and could not be reached. So they followed the advice of King Louis XIII and fled to the free imperial city of Metz on 16 June 1635.

In November 1635 the imperial commissioner Bertram von Sturm appeared in the Nassau lands of and declared the three brothers and had forfeited their counties and all their possessions. The Emperor gave the Duke of Lorraine the counties of Saarbrücken and Saarland and the bailiwick of Herbitzheim and the fortress of Homburg on the Blies as a reward for services rendered.

In 1636, the brothers attempted to petition the Emperor for an imperial pardon; the Elector of Saxony mediated. This attempt failed, but it wasn't until 1637 that the counts were told the reasons for this imperial wrath. Only in 1639 did William Louis and Ernest receive a pass that enabled them to represent their cause in Vienna in person.

William Louis died on 22 August 1640 in Metz and was buried in a pauper's grave. His widow returned with the children to Saarbrücken in 1643. His three sons participated in a new division of the Nassau territories on 31 March 1659.

Registrar Andreae completed William Louis's genealogy books, a project his father Louis II had begun. Some works of the painter Henrich Dors from Altweilnau were commissioned by William Louis.

== Marriage and issue ==
On 25 November 1615 he married Countess Anna Amalia of Baden-Durlach (1595–1651), daughter of the Margrave George Frederick of Baden-Durlach.

- Anna Juliane (1617–1667), married Count Palatine Frederick of Zweibrücken
- Maurice (1618-1618)
- Charlotte (1619–1687), married Louis Everhard of Leiningen-Westerburg
- Crato (born: April 7, 1621 in Saarbrücken, died: 25 July 1642 at a battle in Straelen)
- Anna Amalia (1623–1695)
- John Louis (1625–1690); inherited Ottweiler and founded the Nassau-Ottweiler line
- Elisabeth Sibylle(1626–1627)
- Marie Sibylle (1628–1699), married in 1651 August Philipp, Duke of Schleswig-Holstein-Sonderburg-Beck
- George Frederick (1630-1630)
- Gustav Adolph (1632–1677); inherited Saarbrücken
- George Frederick (1633–1635)
- Walrad (1635–1702); inherited Usingen and founded the Nassau-Usingen line

== See also ==
- House of Nassau

== References and sources ==
- Richard Kolb (1898). "Wilhelm Ludwig (Count of Nassau-Saarbrücken)" . Allgemeine Deutsche Biographie (in German). Vol. 43. Leipzig: Duncker & Humblot. pp. 131–133.
- "William Louis, Count of Nassau-Saarbrücken". Neue Deutsche Biographie (in German). Vol. 7. Berlin: Duncker & Humblot. 1966. p. 334. (added entry)
- "William Louis, Count of Nassau-Saarbrücken". Neue Deutsche Biographie (in German). Vol. 15. Berlin: Duncker & Humblot. 1987. p. 404. (added entry)
- Joe Conrad. "William Louis, Count of Nassau-Saarbrücken". Biographisch-Bibliographisches Kirchenlexikon (BBKL) (in German).

William Louis, Count of Nassau-Saarbrücken House of Nassau Born: 18 December 1590 Died: 22 August 1640
Preceded by Louis II as Count of Nassau-Weilburg	Count of Nassau-Saarbrücken; 1627-1640	Succeeded by Gustav Adolph
