= Simon IV =

Simon IV may refer to:

- Simon de Montfort (died 1188), sometimes called Simon IV de Montfort
- Simon de Montfort, 5th Earl of Leicester (died 1218), sometimes called Simon IV de Montfort
- Simon IV of Clefmont (died c. 1239)
- Simon IV of Sexfontaines (died c. 1265)
- Simon IV, Count of Saarbrücken (died 1308)
- Simon IV, Lord of Lippe (died 1429)
- Simon IV Wecker (died 1499), count of Zweibrücken-Bitsch
