= Westerburg-Leiningen-Leiningen =

Westerburg-Leiningen-Leiningen
1547–1635
Capital; Circle; Bench	Leiningen
Partitioned from Leiningen-Westerburg	1547
ext.	1635

Leiningen-Westerburg was an historic state of the Holy Roman Empire, located in the vicinity of Leiningen and Westerburg in what is now the German state of Rhineland-Palatinate.

Westerburg-Leiningen-Leiningen was formed in 1547 when, upon the death of Kuno II, Count of Leiningen-Westerburg, Leiningen-Westerburg was divided into Westerburg-Leiningen-Leiningen and Westerburg-Leiningen-Westerburg.

This state was ruled by a branch of the House of Leiningen. It lasted until 1705, when it was absorbed by Leiningen-Schaumberg.

== See also ==
- Barony of Westerburg
