= Westerburg-Leiningen-Westerburg =

Westerburg-Leiningen-Westerburg
1547–1597
Capital; Circle; Bench
Partitioned from Leiningen-Westerburg	1547
ext.	1597

Leiningen-Westerburg was an historic state of the Holy Roman Empire, located in the vicinity of Leiningen and Westerburg in what is now the German state of Rhineland-Palatinate.

Westerburg-Leiningen-Leiningen was formed in 1547 when, upon the death of Kuno, Count of Leiningen-Westerburg, Leiningen-Westerburg was divided into Westerburg-Leiningen-Leiningen and Westerburg-Leiningen-Westerburg.

== See also ==
- Barony of Westerburg
