= Lauretta of Saarbrücken =

- Count of Saarbrücken; Graf von Saarbrücken

Count of Saarbrücken
- Reign: 1233-1271
- Died: c. 1271
- House: House of Saarbrücken
- Father: Simon III, Count of Saarbrücken
- Mother: Lauretta of Upper Lorraine

Lauretta of Saarbrücken (died 1271) was a sovereign countess regnant of Saarbrücken from 1233 to 1271.

After the death of his son Dietrich in 1227, her father chose Lauretta as his heiress as Countess of Saarbrücken, with an official statement with the Bishop of Metz, and gave a part of the county to each of the daughters (mentioning "Joffroi d'Aspremont, Lorate, Mahaus & Jehane"). She succeeded Simon as the Countess of Saarbrücken at his death in 1233.

She was married twice: first to Gottfried/Geoffroi II of Aspremont (d. 1250), son of Gobert VI of Apremont and second in 1252 to Dietrich I Luf of Cleves (de) (c.1228 - 1277), a junior son of Dietrich V (?), Count of Cleves (1185 - 1260).

Both husbands were considered counts jure uxoris from 1243 to 1259 when Dietrich returned to Cleves (Kleve). Loretta and Dietrich had a young daughter, Richardis (d.a. 1326), who was not yet married, and Loretta let her sister Mathilde inherit the county. Richardis married 1285 to Gerlach II (d.b. 1325) Herr of Dollendorf and Kronenburg, probably son of Gerlach I of Dollendorf, and they had at least one child.

== Notes ==
Lauretta of Saarbrücken House of Saarbrücken
Regnal titles
Preceded by Simon III	Countess of Saarbrücken; 1233-1271	Succeeded by Mathilde
