= John Louis, Count of Nassau-Saarbrücken =

Count of Saarbrücken (1472–1544) and Saarwerden (1527-1544)

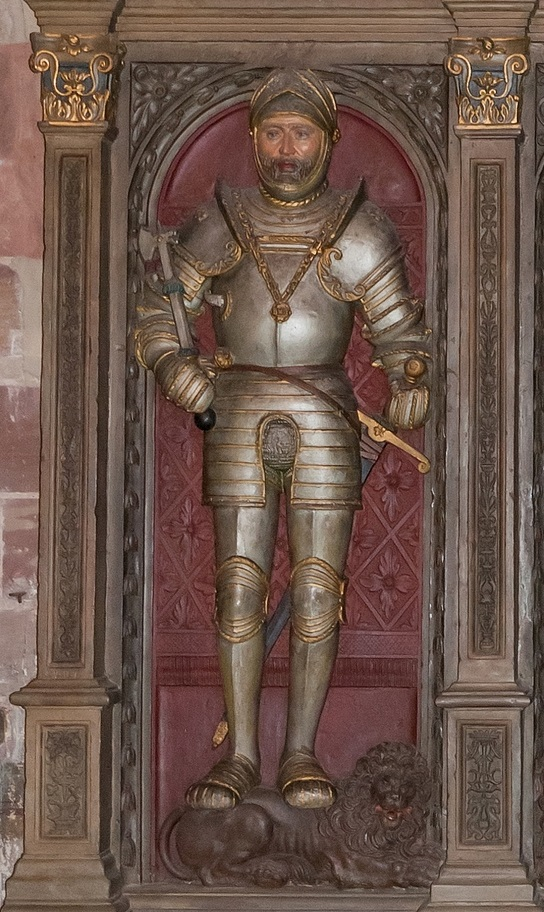
- Born: 19 October 1472; Saarbrücken
- Died: 4 June 1545 (aged 72); Saarbrücken
- Noble family: House of Nassau
- Spouses: Elisabeth of Palatinate-Zweibrücken; Catherine of Moers
- Father: John II of Nassau-Saarbrücken
- Mother: Elisabeth of Württemberg-Urach

Count John Louis of Nassau-Saarbrücken (19 October 1472, in Saarbrücken – 4 June 1545, in ibid.) was the posthumous son of Count John II and his second wife, Elisabeth of Württemberg-Urach.

In 1492, he married Elisabeth (1469–1500), the daughter of Count Palatine Louis I of Zweibrücken. They had the following children:

- Ottilie (1492–1554), married John V of Sayn in 1516
- Anna (1493–1565)
- Elisabeth (1495–1559)
- Johanna (1496–1566)
- Margaret (b. 1497)
- Felicitas (b. 1499)

After Elisabeth's death, John remarried in 1506 to Catherine of Moers-Saarwerden (1491–1547). They had the following children:

- Philip II (1509–1554)
- John III, married Adelaide of Kronengracht,
- Margaret (1513–1562)
- Elisabeth (1515–1568)
- Catherine (1517–1553), married in 1537 to Count Emich IX of Leiningen-Dagsburg
- Agnes (b. 1519)
- John Louis (1524–1542)
- Adolph I (1526–1559), married in 1553 to Anastasia of Isenburg-Grenzau

== Ancestry ==
Ancestors of John Louis, Count of Nassau-Saarbrücken

8. John I, Count of Nassau-Weilburg
4. Philipp I, Count of Nassau-Weilburg
9. Johanna of Saarbrücken
2. Johann II of Nassau-Saarbrücken
10. Frederick I, Count of Vaudémont
5. Elisabeth of Lorraine-Vaudémont
11. Margaret of Joinville
1. John Louis, Count of Nassau-Saarbrücken
12. Eberhard IV, Count of Württemberg
6. Ludwig I, Count of Württemberg-Urach
13. Henriette, Countess of Montbéliard
3. Elisabeth of Württemberg-Urach
14. Louis III, Elector Palatine
7. Mechthild of Germany
15. Matilda of Savoy

John Louis, Count of Nassau-Saarbrücken House of Nassau Born: 19 October 1472 Died: 4 June 1545
Preceded by John II	Count of Nassau-Saarbrücken; 1472-1545	Succeeded by Philip II
