= Crato, Count of Nassau-Saarbrücken =

- Born: 7 April 1621
- Died: 25 July 1642 (aged 21); Straelen
- Noble family: Nassau
- Father: William Louis, Count of Nassau-Saarbrücken
- Mother: Anna Amalia of Baden-Durlach

Crato, Count of Nassau-Saarbrücken (7 April 1621 – 25 July 1642, Straelen), was the oldest son of Count William Louis of Nassau-Saarbrücken and his wife, Landgravine Anna Amalia of Baden-Durlach. He succeeded his father as Count of Nassau-Saarbrücken in 1640. As he was still a minor at the time, he stood under the regency of his mother.

Crato was killed in battle at Straelen in 1642 and was succeeded by his younger brother John Louis.

Crato, Count of Nassau-Saarbrücken House of Nassau Born: 7 April 1621 Died: 25 Juli 1642
Preceded by William Louis	Count of Nassau-Saarbrücken; 1640-1642	Succeeded by John Louis
