= Bertram von Sturm =

- Born: c. 1595
- Died: 20 January 1639; Frankfurt
- Buried: Dominican monastery in Frankfurt
- Noble family: von Sturm zu Vehlingen

Bertram Sturm, from 1632 Bertram von Sturm zu Vehlingen, (c. 1595 – 20 January 1639 in Frankfurt) was Imperial Council, Imperial Chief War Commissioner of the Upper and Lower Rhine district in Frankfurt and was bailiff for the House of Lobkowicz in the Lordships of Idstein and Weilburg.

== Life ==
Bertram Sturm was a descendant of an old family from Münstereifel in the Duchy of Jülich, which is first mentioned in 1436. They had been advisors for generations. On 12 September 1632, he was ennobled in Vienna, and his family name was officially changed into von Sturm zu Vehlingen. On 23 September 1633 in Ebersdorf, Emperor Ferdinand II gave him the predicate von Vehlingen. Nevertheless, his descendants used the family name von Sturm zu Vehlingen.

In the November 1635 Sturm declared that Count William Louis of Nassau-Saarbrücken had forfeited his county. Sturm had a very important function in the region during the Thirty Years' War as a representative of the Emperor. On behalf of the Emperor, he administered lands whose sovereigns had fled or been deposed. He probably used his position to enrich himself. Sturm was portrayed as greedy. From 1650, the Sturm family owned the castle at Odendorf in Swisttal.

At the christening of his son Ferdinand Phillip Casimir on 14 April 1637, both the Emperor and King Philip III of Spain acted as godfather of honor.

Bertram von Sturm zu Vehlingen died on 20 January 1637 in Frankfurt am Main and was buried in the local Dominican monastery. His tomb stone in the church, which is no longer available, showed this date. The register at Frankfurt states his death date as January 9. This difference can be explained as the effect of the Gregorian calendar reform, which only happened in Frankfurt in 1700.
