= Gustav Adolph, Count of Nassau-Saarbrücken =

Gustav Adolf of Nassau-Saarbrücken
- Born: 27 March 1632; Saarbrücken
- Died: 9 October 1677 (aged 45); Strasbourg
- Noble family: House of Nassau
- Spouse: Landgravine Eleonore Klara of Hohenlohe-Neuenstein
- Father: William Louis, Count of Nassau-Saarbrücken
- Mother: Countess Anna Amalia of Baden-Durlach

Gustav Adolf of Nassau-Saarbrücken (27 March 1632 – 9 October 1677) was Count of Saarbrücken and Major General at the Rhine of the Holy Roman Empire.

He was the third son of Count William Louis of Nassau-Saarbrücken (1590 – 22 August 1640) and Countess Anna Amalia of Baden-Durlach (1595–1651), who named him after king Gustav II Adolf of Sweden, who was still alive at the time.

During the Thirty Years' War (1618–1648), the family fled to Metz, where his father died in 1640. In 1643 his mother returned to Saarbrücken with the children.

From 1645 to 1649 he studied in Basel.

He then fought on the French side against Spain. In 1658 he fought against Denmark in the service of the Swedish king Charles X Gustav, who was a duke of the house Palatinate-Zweibrücken. Later, he served in the imperial army, possibly until 1659.

Until 1651 his mother had been Regent of his behalf; from 1651 to 1659, his older brother John Louis had been regent. In 1660, Gustav Adolf and his brothers John Louis and Walrad divided the territory and Gustav Adolf took up the reign of the counties of Saarbrücken and Saarwerden.

He set about rebuilding the war-ravaged country, brought back refugees and recruited settlers for agriculture and skilled workers for the glass industry in Klarenthal. (Note: named after his wife, Eleonore Klara; now a district in the west of Saarbrücken)

Adolf could not resist King Louis XIV's "reunion policy". He refused to swear the required oath of fealty from the king, even when he was captured in 1673 by the French and taken to Metz. After his release the following year, he was not allowed to return to his country.

Adolf enrolled in the imperial army in 1676 and participated in the battle of Philippsburg in the Alsace in 1677. He died of injuries suffered in combat on Mount Kochersberg (northwest of Strasbourg). He was finally buried, after several temporary graves, in the St. Thomas Church at Strasbourg. His mummified corpse was on display there from 1802 to 1990 in a glass sarcophagus. His body was transferred and buried in the tomb erected by his wife in the castle church in Saarbrücken in 1998.

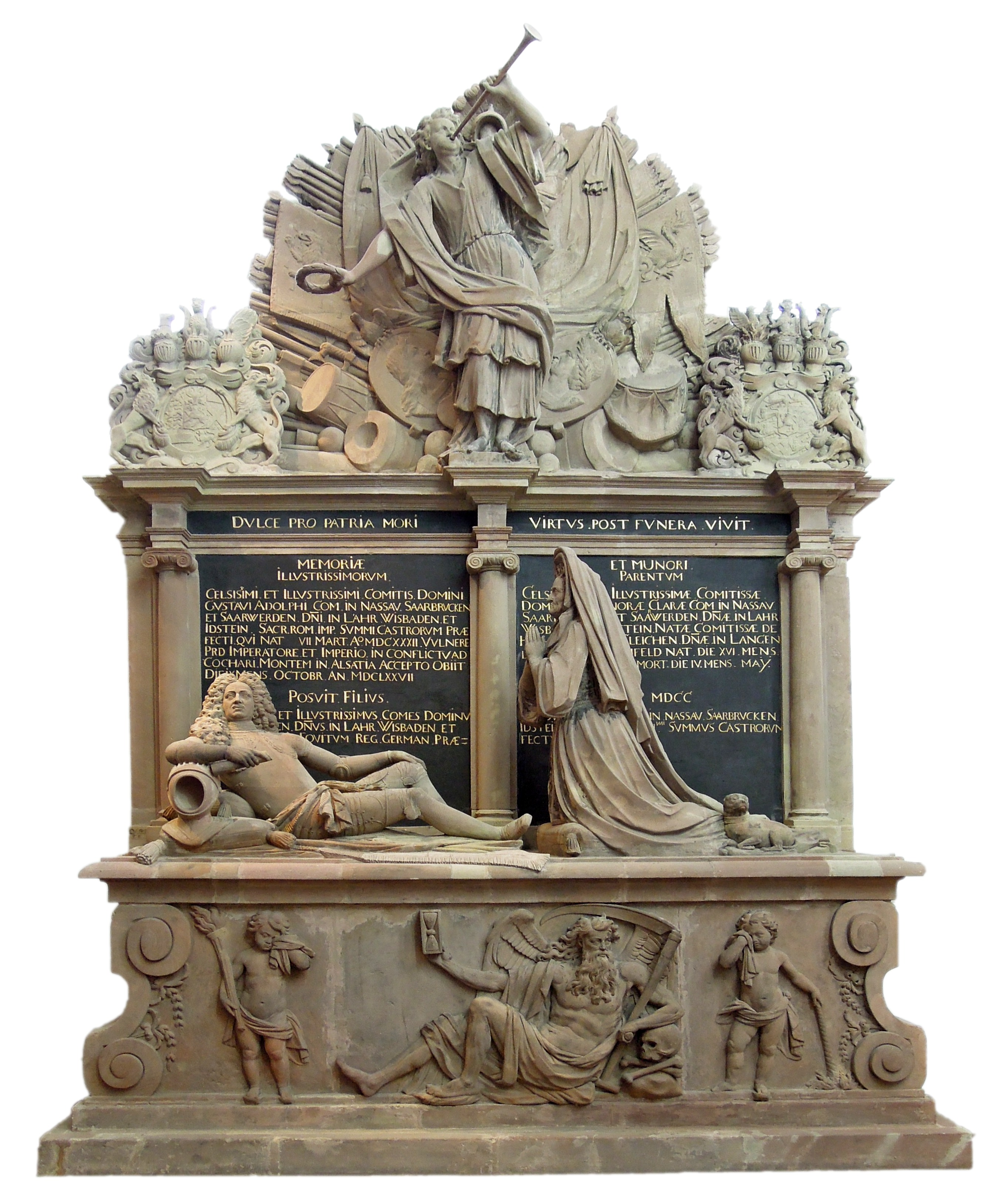
Tomb of Gustav Adolph, Count of Nassau-Saarbrücken, in the castle church in Saarbrücken.

== Marriage and issue ==
On 14 June 1662 he married Landgravine Eleonore Klara of Hohenlohe-Neuenstein (1632–1709), daughter of the Count Crato of Hohenlohe-Neuenstein, with whom he had seven children:

- Louis Crato (1663–1713)
- Charles Louis (1665–1723)
- Sophie Amalia (1666–1736), married to Albert Wolfgang, Count of Hohenlohe-Langenburg.
- Gustav Adolph (1667–1683)
- Sophie Eleonore (1669–1742)
- Sophie Dorothea (1670–1748)
- Philip William (1671–1671)

== Notes ==
Gustav Adolph, Count of Nassau-Saarbrücken House of Nassau Born: 27 March 1632 Died: 9 October 1677
Preceded by William Louis	Count of Nassau-Saarbrücken; 1659-1677	Succeeded by Louis Crato
