= Venizy =

- Commune
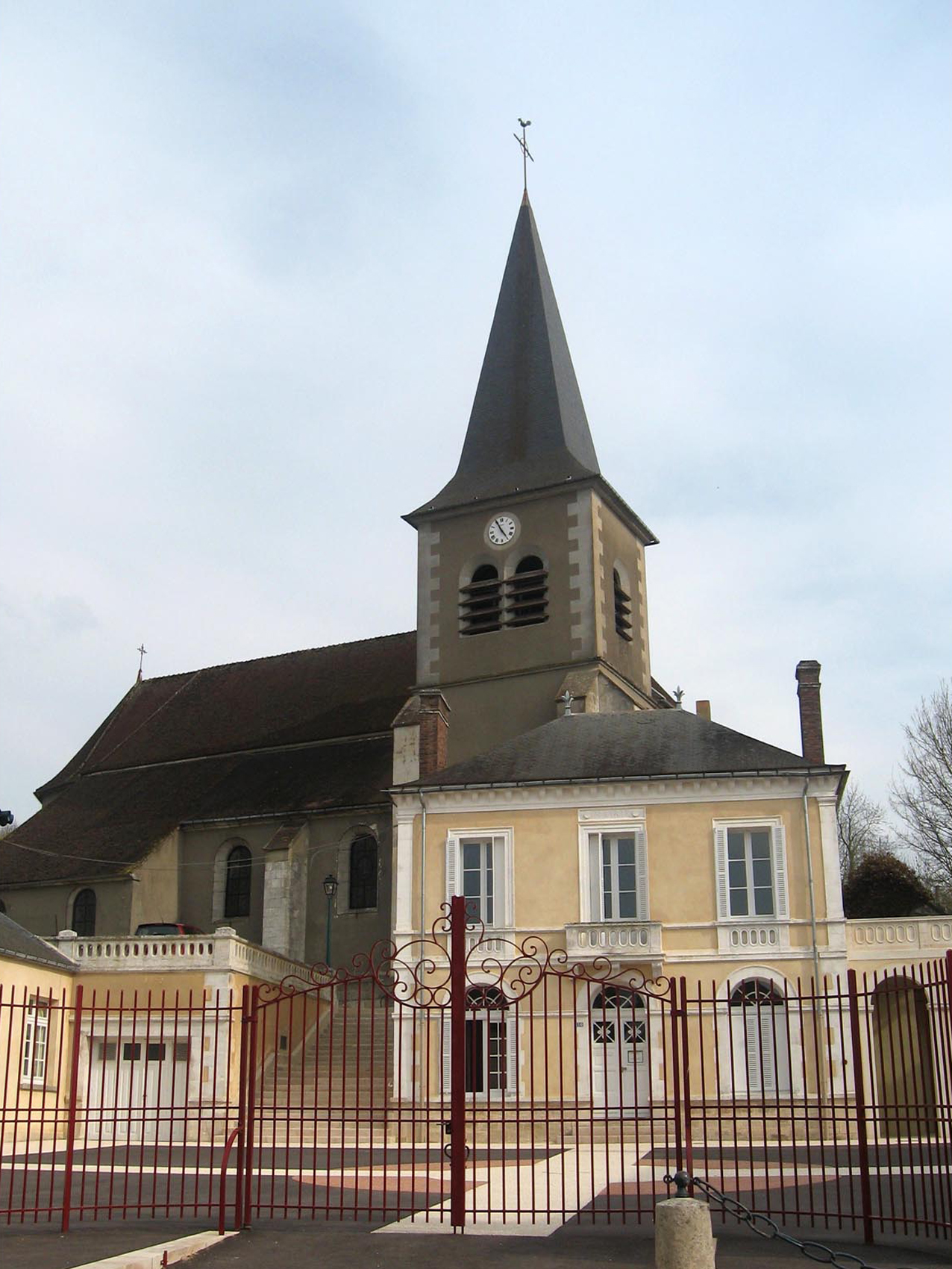
- Church of Notre-Dame de Venizy

- Coat of arms
- Location of Venizy
- Location within France Location within Bourgogne-Franche-Comté
- Coordinates: 48°02′10″N 3°42′34″E
- Country: France
- Region: Bourgogne-Franche-Comté
- Department: Yonne
- Arrondissement: Auxerre
- Canton: Brienon-sur-Armançon

Government
  - Mayor (2020–2026): Sylvain Quoirin
- Area^{1}: 43.68 km^{2} (16.86 sq mi)
- Highest elevation: 289 m (948 ft)
- Lowest elevation: 106 m (348 ft)
- Population (2023): 824
  - Density: 18.9/km^{2} (48.9/sq mi)
- Time zone: UTC+01:00 (CET)
  - Summer (DST): UTC+02:00 (CEST)
- INSEE/Postal code: 89436 /89210
- ^{1} French Land Register data, which excludes lakes, ponds, glaciers > 1 km^{2} (0.386 sq mi or 247 acres) and river estuaries.

Venizy (French pronunciation: [vənizi]) is a commune in the Yonne department in Bourgogne-Franche-Comté in north-central France.

== See also ==
- Communes of the Yonne department
