= Philip II of Nassau-Saarbrücken =

Philip II, Count of Nassau-Saarbrücken
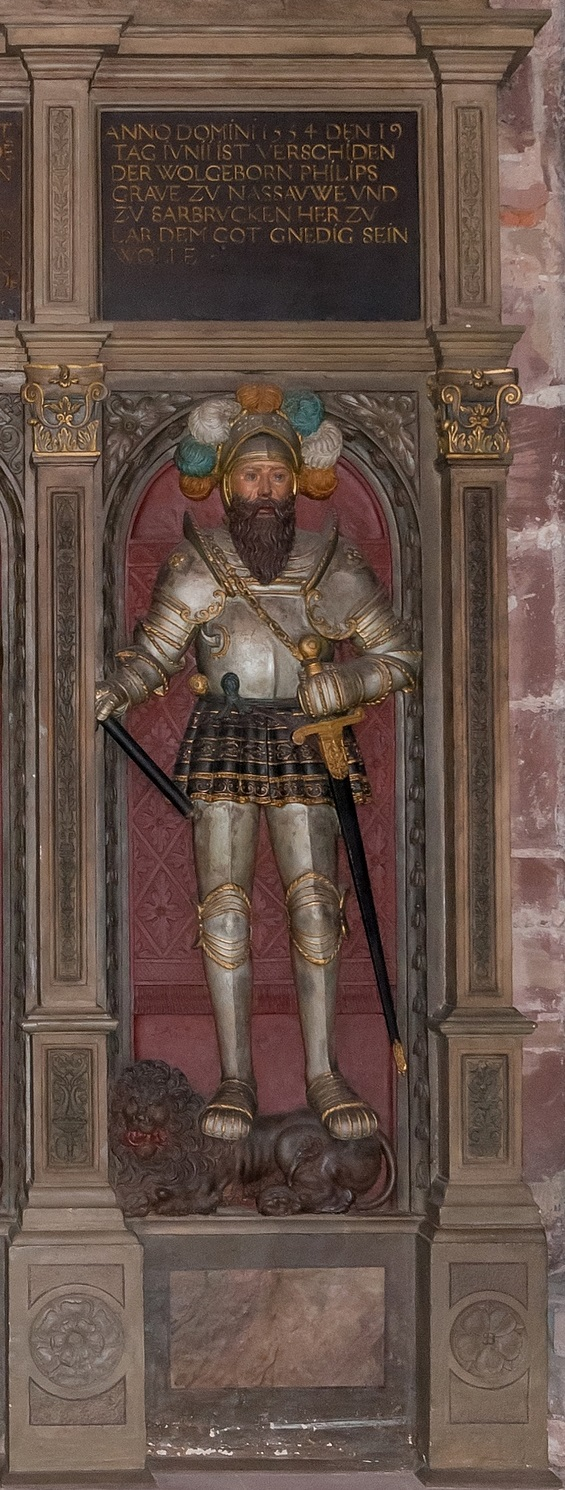
- Born: 25 July 1509; Saarbrücken
- Died: 19 June 1554 (aged 44); Strasbourg
- Noble family: House of Nassau
- Spouse: Catherine of Leiningen-Hartenberg
- Father: John Louis, Count of Nassau-Saarbrücken
- Mother: Catherine of Moers

Philip II, Count of Nassau-Saarbrücken (25 July 1509 – 19 June 1554) was a nobleman from the Holy Roman Empire.

He was born in Saarbrücken, the eldest son of John Louis and his second wife, Catherine of Moers.

In 1537, he married Catherine of Leiningen-Hartenburg (d. 1585). This marriage remained childless.

In 1545, he succeeded his father as Count of Nassau-Saarbrücken.

He died childless, in Strasbourg, on 19 June 1554, aged 44, and was succeeded by his younger brother John III.

Philip II of Nassau-Saarbrücken House of Nassau Born: 25 July 1509 Died: 19 June 1554
Preceded by John Louis	Count of Nassau-Saarbrücken; 1545-1554	Succeeded by John III
