= John III of Nassau-Saarbrücken =

John III, Count of Nassau-Saarbrücken
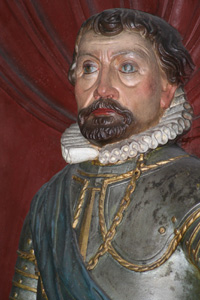
- Born: 5 April 1511
- Died: 23 November 1574 (aged 63); Saarbrücken
- Noble family: House of Nassau
- Spouses: Adelaide of Kronenkracht; Elisabeth Selz
- Father: John Louis, Count of Nassau-Saarbrücken
- Mother: Catherine of Moers and Saarwerden

John III, Count of Nassau-Saarbrücken (5 April 1511 – 23 November 1574) was a son of Count John Louis of Nassau-Saarbrücken and his second wife Catherine of Moers. He succeeded his childless brother Philip II in 1554 as Count of Nassau-Saarbrücken. He married Adelaide of Kronenkracht and Elisabeth Selz. However, his children predeceased him. When he died in 1574, Nassau-Saarbrücken fell to Nassau-Weilburg.

John III of Nassau-Saarbrücken House of Nassau Born: 5 April 1511 Died: 23 November 1574
Preceded by Philip II	Count of Nassau-Saarbrücken; 1554-1574	Succeeded by Philip IV as Count of Nassau-Weilburg
