= Dollendorf =

- Ortsteil of Blankenheim
- Interactive map of Dollendorf
- Location within Germany Location within North Rhine-Westphalia
- Coordinates: 50°22′20″N 06°42′27″E
- Country: Germany
- State: North Rhine-Westphalia
- District: Euskirchen
- Municipality: Blankenheim

Area
  - Total: 18.13 km^{2} (7.00 sq mi)
- Elevation: 450 m (1,480 ft)

Population
  - Total: 820
  - Density: 45/km^{2} (120/sq mi)
- Time zone: UTC+01:00 (CET)
  - Summer (DST): UTC+02:00 (CEST)
- Postal codes: 53945
- Dialling codes: 02697

Dollendorf is a village in the municipality of Blankenheim in the district of Euskirchen in the German state of North Rhine-Westphalia. It gives its name to the surrounding limestone depression (Kalkmulde).

== History ==
Dollendorf was incorporated into Blankenheim on 1 July 1969.

== Sights ==
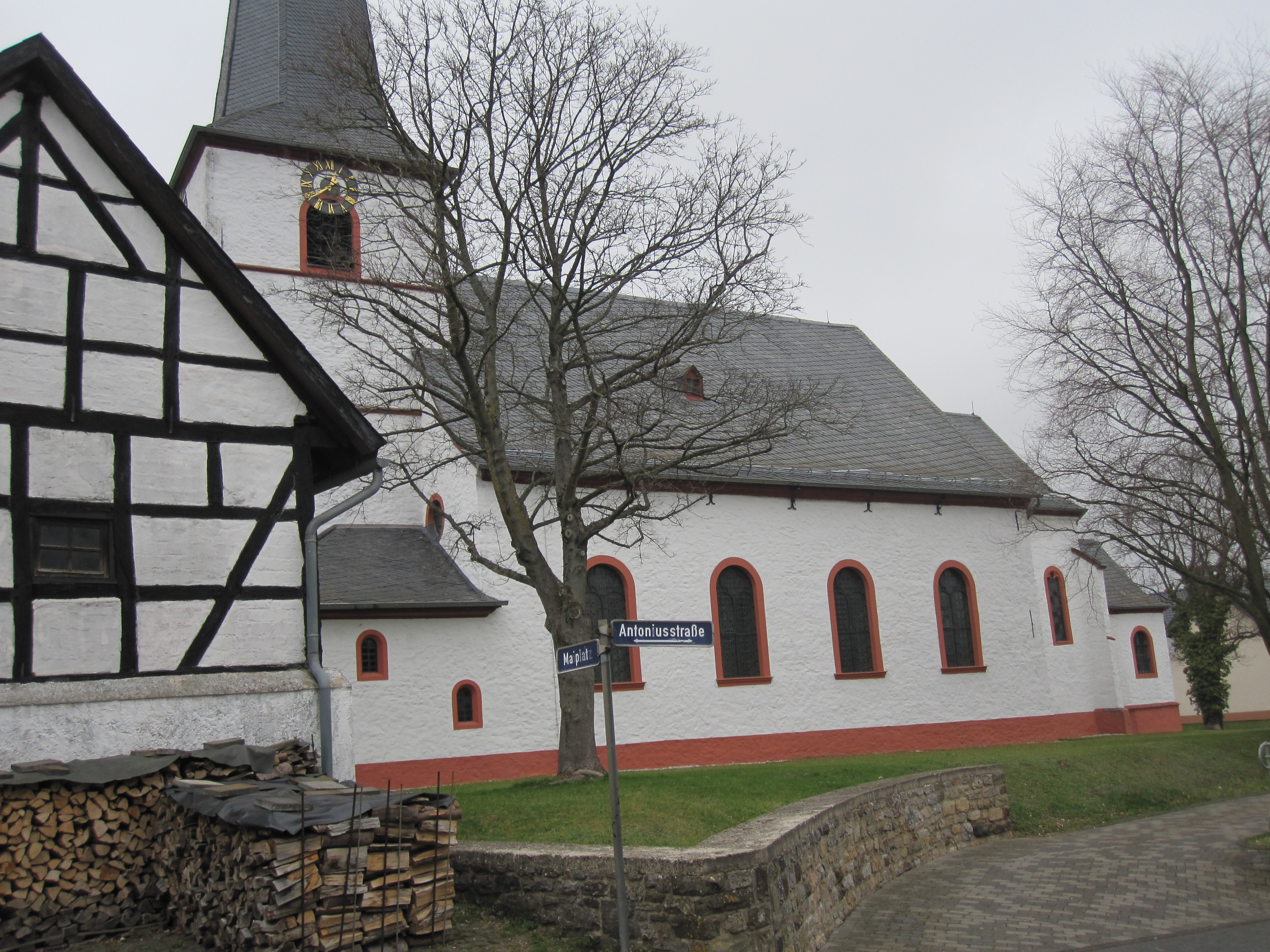
Catholic parish church of St. John the Baptist

- Catholic parish church of St. John the Baptist (14th-century tower; nave built 1732–1736)
- War memorial to the fallen of the First World War; inaugurated on 30 May 1926
- Typical farmhouses from the 18th and 19th centuries.
- Chapel of St. Anthony of Padua (on the Stations of the Cross between Dollendorf and Schloßthal)
- Dollendorf Castle ruins
- Neuweiler Castle not far from Ahrhütte, below Schloßthal (wall remains)
- Haus Vellen or Vellerhof (Clemens-Josef-Haus), courtyard building from the 18th century with chapel and its own cemetery.

== Literature ==
- Franz-Josef Außem: Die Pflanzenwelt in der Dollendorfer Kalkmulde in der Eifel. Cologne, 1994. ISBN 3-88094-745-7
- Johannes Becker: Geschichte der Pfarreien des Dekanats Blankenheim. Cologne, 1993, pp. 461 ff.
- Christoph Bungartz, Ralf Gier, Peter Scheulen: Von der Eifel nach Amerika. Auswanderung nach Nordamerika 1840–1914. Euskirchen, 2005. ISBN 3-935221-55-X
- Hermann Bungartz: Dollendorf/Eifel. Landschaft und Geschichte., 2nd expanded edn., Hillesheim, 1989
- Dollendorf. Bilder eines Eifeldorfes., Cologne, 1993
- Peter Neu: Rheinischer Städteatlas. Dollendorf, Bonn 1976
- Ernst Wackenroder: Die Kunstdenkmäler des Kreises Schleiden, Düsseldorf, 1932, pp. 98–108
