= John I of Nassau-Weilburg =

John I of Nassau-Weilburg (1309–1371) was Count of Nassau-Weilburg from 1355 to 1371.

John I was the second son of Count Gerlach I of Nassau-Wiesbaden and Agnes of Hesse, granddaughter of Henry I, Landgrave of Hesse. On Gerlach I abdication in 1346, John and his brothers divided the family lands. John acquired Weilburg on the Lahn.

John was elevated by Emperor Charles IV in 1366 to Imperial Count. He died on September 20, 1371.

== Family and children ==
John I was married twice. His first marriage in 1333 was to Gertrude of Merenberg (died 1350), daughter and heiress of Hartrad, the last Lord of Merenberg and Gleiberg. Gertrude died on October 6, 1350, and was buried in Weilburg. The couple had one child, a daughter. She was engaged in 1340 with Reinhard II of Westerburg, but died shortly thereafter.

John I's second marriage in 1353 was to Johanna of Saarbrücken, Dame de Commercy and heiress of Count John II of Saarbrücken. This union produced seven children:

1. Johanna (1362–1383), married in Kassel in 1377 to Hermann II, Landgrave of Hesse (c. 1342 – June 10, 1413). Johanna died on January 1, 1383, in Marburg and was buried.
2. John, and
3. Johannette (twins, died October 6, 1365).
4. Agnes (died 1401), married in 1382 to Count Simon III Wecker of Zweibrücken-Bitsch.
5. Philipp I of Nassau-Weilburg
6. Schonetta (died 25 April 1436), married:
  1. on 30 June 1384 to Henry X of Homburg;
  2. in 1414 to Otto II, Duke of Brunswick-Osterode.
7. Margarete (died 22 January 1427), married c. 1393 to Count Frederick III of Veldenz.

== Sources ==
- Dek, Dr. Adriaan Willem Eliza (1970). Genealogie van het vorstenhuis Nassau (Genealogy of the Ruling House of Nassau) (in Dutch). Zaltbommel: Eurpoese Bibliotheek. OCLC 27365371., p. 25.

John I of Nassau-Weilburg House of Nassau Born: 1309 Died: 20 September 1371
| Preceded by Gerlach I | Count of Nassau-Weilburg; 1355–1371 | Succeeded by Philipp I |
