= Montfaucon, Doubs =

Montfaucon
- Commune
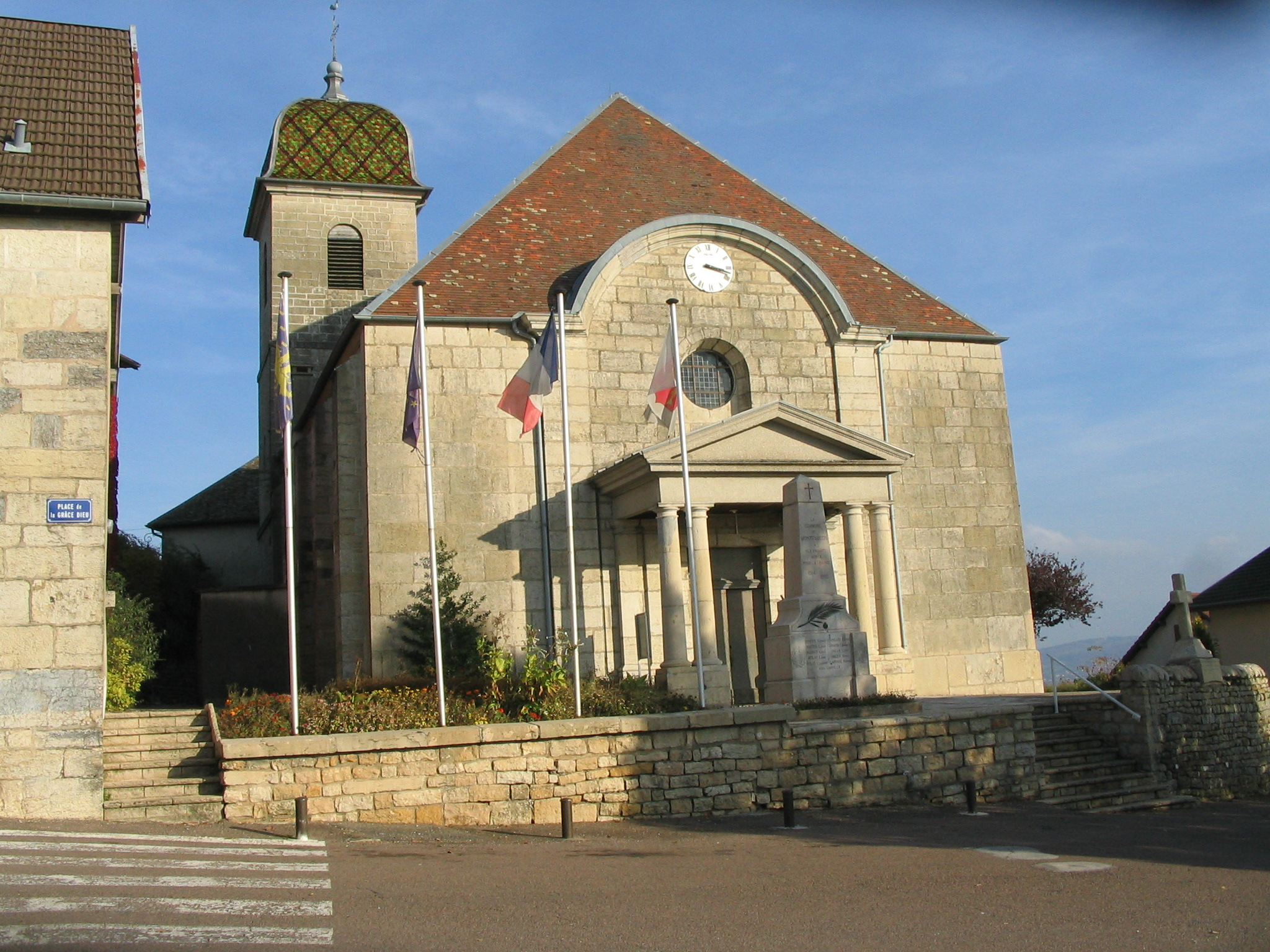
- The church in Montfaucon

- Coat of arms
- Location of Montfaucon
- Location within France Location within Bourgogne-Franche-Comté
- Coordinates: 47°14′07″N 6°04′50″E
- Country: France
- Region: Bourgogne-Franche-Comté
- Department: Doubs
- Arrondissement: Besançon
- Canton: Besançon-5
- Intercommunality: Grand Besançon Métropole

Government
  - Mayor (2020–2026): Pierre Contoz
- Area^{1}: 7.25 km^{2} (2.80 sq mi)
- Highest elevation: 614 m (2,014 ft)
- Lowest elevation: 240 m (790 ft)
- Population (2023): 1,622
  - Density: 224/km^{2} (579/sq mi)
- Time zone: UTC+01:00 (CET)
  - Summer (DST): UTC+02:00 (CEST)
- INSEE/Postal code: 25395 /25660
- ^{1} French Land Register data, which excludes lakes, ponds, glaciers > 1 km^{2} (0.386 sq mi or 247 acres) and river estuaries.

Montfaucon (French pronunciation: [mɔ̃fokɔ̃]) is a commune in the Doubs department in the region of Bourgogne-Franche-Comté, France.

== Geography ==
Montfaucon lies 7 km (4.3 mi) southeast of Besançon in the valley of the Doubs.

== Population ==
Historical population
Year	Pop.	±% p.a.
1968	510	—
1975	946	+9.23%
1982	1,055	+1.57%
1990	1,262	+2.26%
1999	1,372	+0.93%
2007	1,466	+0.83%
2012	1,496	+0.41%
2017	1,550	+0.71%
2023	1,622	+0.76%
Source: INSEE

== See also ==
- Communes of the Doubs department
