= Straelen =

- Town
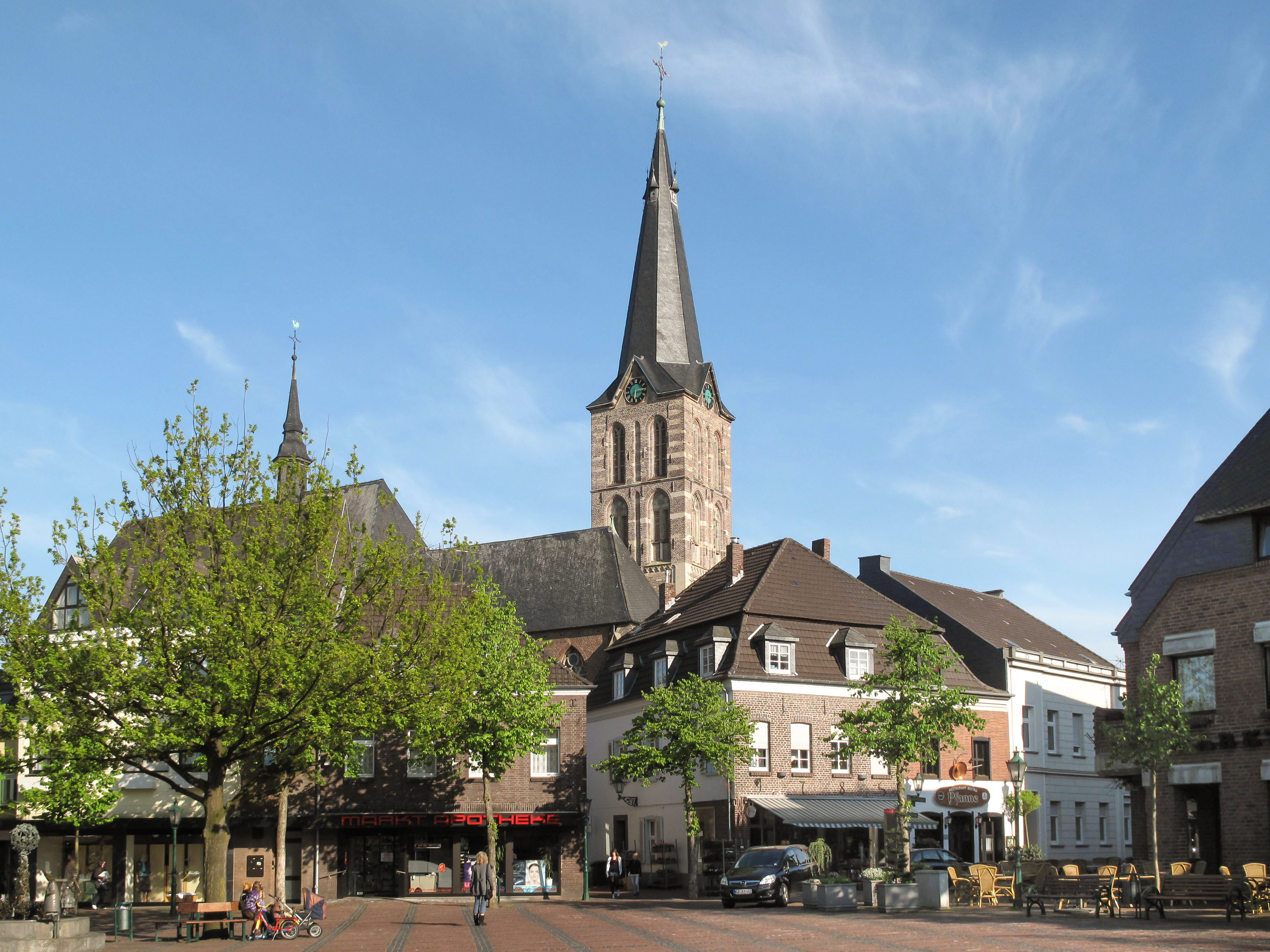

- Coat of arms

- Location of Straelen within Kleve district
- Interactive map of Straelen
- Location within Germany Location within North Rhine-Westphalia
- Coordinates: 51°27′00″N 06°16′00″E
- Country: Germany
- State: North Rhine-Westphalia
- Admin. region: Düsseldorf
- District: Kleve

Government
  - Mayor (2020–25): Bernd Kuse

Area
  - Total: 74 km^{2} (29 sq mi)
- Elevation: 35 m (115 ft)

Population (2025-12-31)
  - Total: 16,454
  - Density: 220/km^{2} (580/sq mi)
- Time zone: UTC+01:00 (CET)
  - Summer (DST): UTC+02:00 (CEST)
- Postal codes: 47638
- Dialling codes: 02834 & 02839
- Vehicle registration: KLE
- Website: www.straelen.de

Straelen (German pronunciation: [ˈʃtʁaːlən]; Low Rhenish: Strale) is a municipality in the district of Cleves, in North Rhine-Westphalia, Germany. It is located near the border with the Netherlands, approx. 10 km north-east of Venlo.

Twinning : Bayon in Meurthe-et-Moselle (France), since 7 July 1963.

== History ==
Historical affiliations

County of Guelders 1118–1339
Duchy of Guelders 1339–1393
Duchy of Jülich 1393–1423
Duchy of Guelders 1423–1543
Habsburg Netherlands 1543–1556
Spanish Netherlands 1556–1632
Dutch Republic 1632–1635
Spanish Netherlands 1635–1713
Kingdom of Prussia 1713–1794
French Republic 1794–1804
French Empire 1804–1814
Kingdom of Prussia 1815–1871
German Empire 1871–1918
Weimar Republic 1919–1933
Nazi Germany 1933–1945
Allied-occupied Germany 1945–1949
West Germany 1949–1990
Germany 1990–present

Straelen was first mentioned in Latin as Strala in 1063.

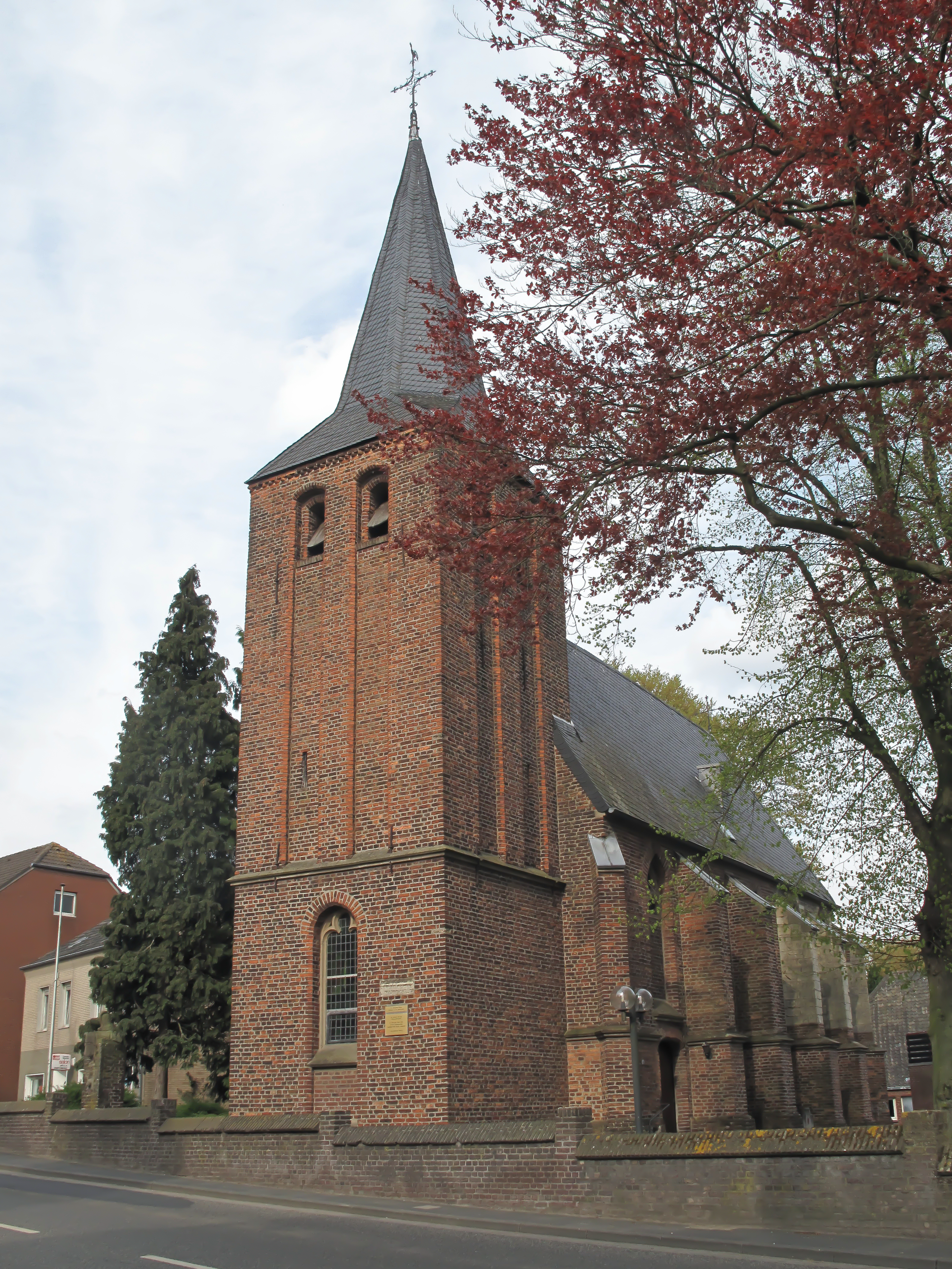
Herongen, church: die Sankt Amanduskirche

== Population ==
Historical population

Year	Pop.	±% p.a.
1965	10,615	—
1970	10,704	+0.17%
1975	10,757	+0.10%
1980	11,544	+1.42%
1985	12,210	+1.13%
1990	12,927	+1.15%
1995	14,511	+2.34%

Year	Pop.	±% p.a.
2000	15,389	+1.18%
2005	15,580	+0.25%
2010	15,374	−0.27%
2015	15,641	+0.34%
2020	16,248	+0.76%
2025	16,454	+0.25%

Source: Landesdatabank Nordrhein-Westfalen
