= Leiningen, Germany =

Leiningen
- Municipality
- Coat of arms

- Location of Leiningen within Rhein-Hunsrück-Kreis district
- Interactive map of Leiningen
- Location within Germany Location within Rhineland-Palatinate
- Coordinates: 50°08′00″N 7°34′13″E
- Country: Germany
- State: Rhineland-Palatinate
- District: Rhein-Hunsrück-Kreis
- Municipal assoc.: Hunsrück-Mittelrhein

Government
  - Mayor (2019–24): Frank Morschhäuser

Area
  - Total: 5.75 km^{2} (2.22 sq mi)
- Elevation: 448 m (1,470 ft)

Population (2025-12-31)
  - Total: 711
  - Density: 124/km^{2} (320/sq mi)
- Time zone: UTC+01:00 (CET)
  - Summer (DST): UTC+02:00 (CEST)
- Postal codes: 56291
- Dialling codes: 06746
- Vehicle registration: SIM

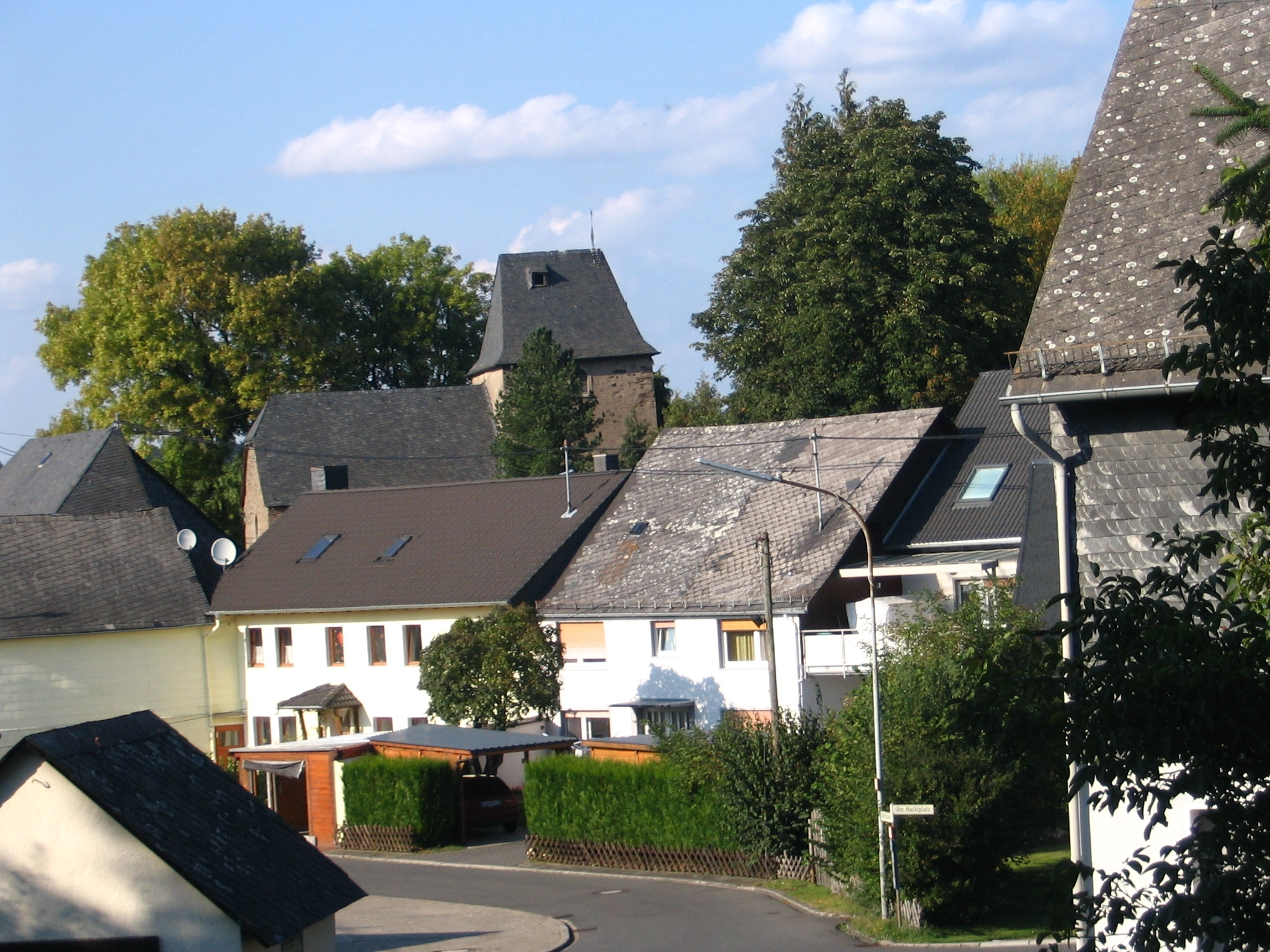
Leiningen's chapel

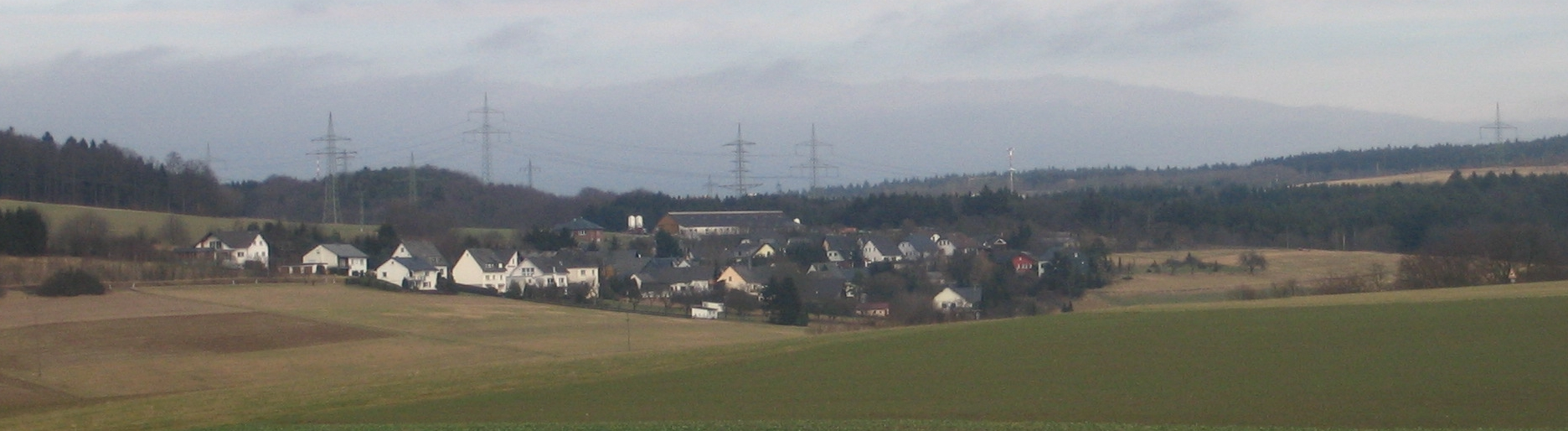
View of Lamscheid from the west

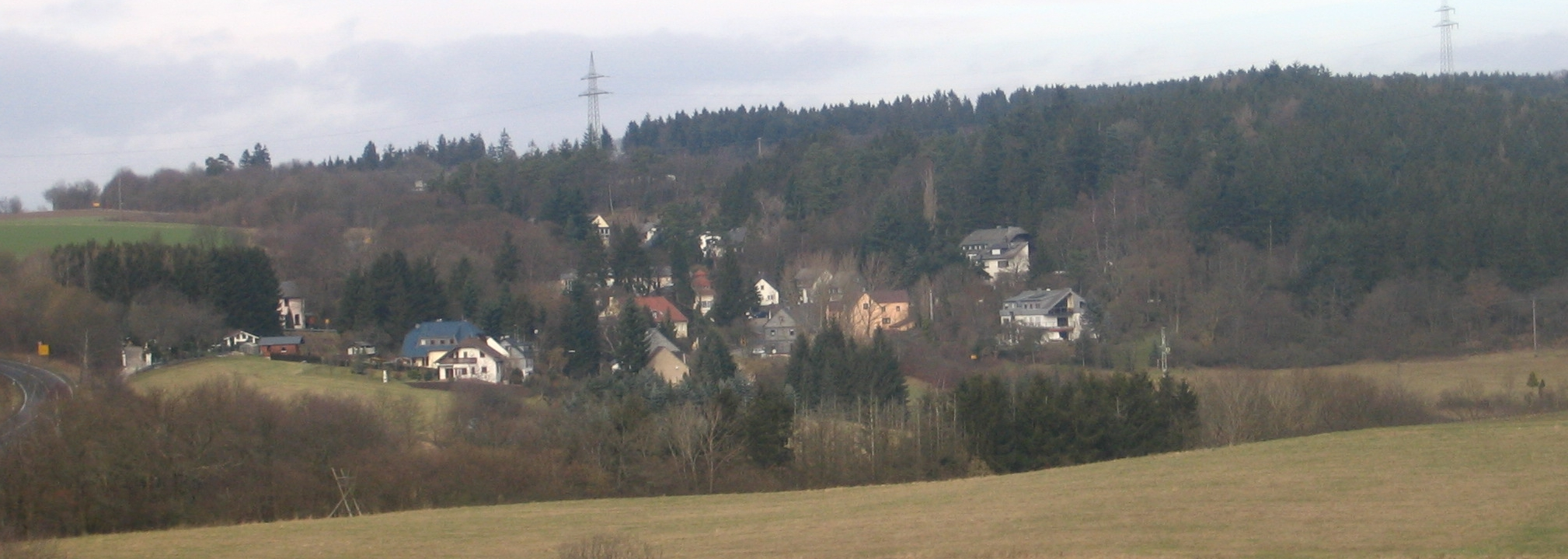
View of Sauerbrunnen from the southwest

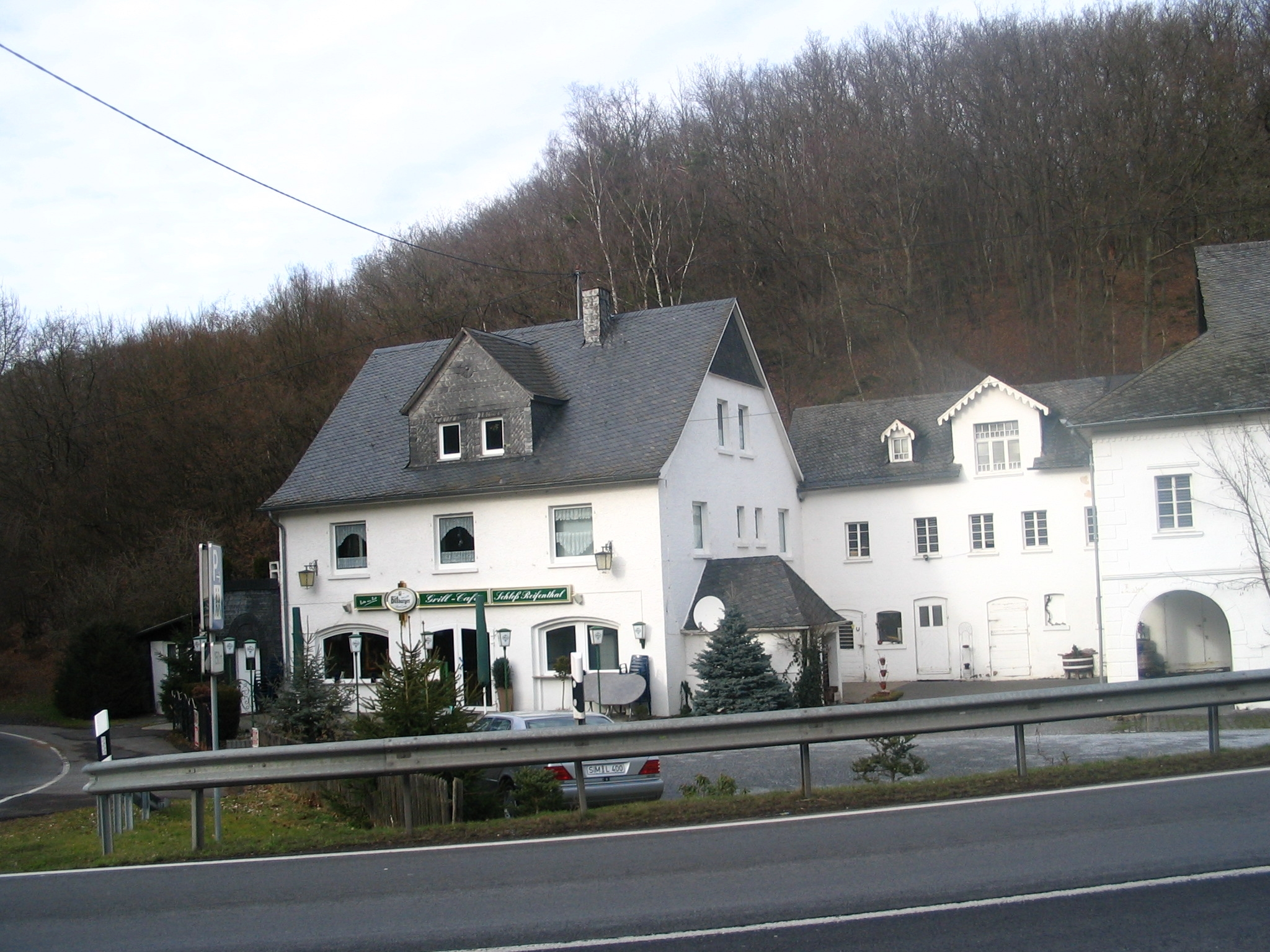
Schloß Reifentahl inn

Leiningen (German pronunciation: [ˈlaɪnɪŋən]) is an Ortsgemeinde – a municipality belonging to a Verbandsgemeinde, a kind of collective municipality – in the Rhein-Hunsrück-Kreis (district) in Rhineland-Palatinate, Germany. It belongs to the Verbandsgemeinde Hunsrück-Mittelrhein, whose seat is in Emmelshausen.

== Geography ==
=== Location ===
The municipality lies in the heights of the Vorderhunsrück (“Fore-Hunsrück”) roughly 15 km from the Rhine and the Moselle, and 30 km from Koblenz. The direct interchange onto the Autobahn A 61 affords a quick link to places to the north and south.

From here run many hiking trails and a direct link to the Schinderhannes-Radweg (cycle path); the outlying centre of Lamscheid lies directly on this cycle path.

=== Constituent communities ===
Leiningen's Ortsteile besides the main centre, also called Leiningen, are Lamscheid, Sauerbrunnen and Schloß Reifenthal, which despite its name is actually a hamlet, not a castle or a palace.

== History ==
The Counts of Leyen at Gondorf were Leiningen's lords in the Middle Ages. Beginning in 1794, Leiningen lay under French rule. In 1815 it was assigned to the Kingdom of Prussia at the Congress of Vienna. Since 1946, it has been part of the then newly founded state of Rhineland-Palatinate.

The current municipality came into being on 7 June 1969 under the name Leiningen-Lamscheid and was a merger of two hitherto self-administering municipalities that had been dissolved, called Leiningen and Lamscheid. On 1 January 1981, however, the name was shortened to Leiningen.

=== Sauerbrunnen ===
This village's history is closely bound with its namesake mineral spring – the name means “Sour Spring” or “Sour Well” – which had its first documentary mention in 1565. In 1780, this spring was set in stone as a token of thanks by Imperial Countess Marianne von der Leyen. About 1786, Sauerbrunnen was a spa centre and the water was sold abroad. By 1789, the well was falling into disrepair. In 1898, a housing was built to contain it, which was renovated in 1910, and on 11 June of that year, the spring was officially recognized as the Lamscheider Stahlbrunnen.

== Politics ==
=== Municipal council ===
The council is made up of 12 council members, who were elected by majority vote at the municipal election held on 26 May 2019, and the honorary mayor as chairman. Previous elections were held on 25 May 2014 and 7 June 2009.

=== Mayor ===
Leiningen's mayor is Frank Morschhäuser.

=== Coat of arms ===
The German blazon reads: Über erhöhtem blauem Schildfuß, darin ein silberner Pfahl, in Silber ein schwarzer Schalenbrunnen mit geteiltem schwarzen Wasserstrahl, begleitet rechts und links von einem roten Krug.

The municipality's arms might in English heraldic language be described thus: Per fess abased argent a fountain basin on a short pedestal sable issuant from which four streams of the same, two each falling into each of two two-handled jugs gules standing on each side of the basin, and azure a pale of the first aligned precisely with the pedestal.

The lower part of the escutcheon recalls the Counts of Leyen at Gondorf, to whom Leiningen once belonged. The charges above the line of partition refer to the sour spring – Sauerbrunnen – which was well known even as far back as the 16th century for its good mineral water. The jugs symbolize the former exportation of the springwater.

== Culture and sightseeing ==
=== Buildings ===
The following are listed buildings or sites in Rhineland-Palatinate’s Directory of Cultural Monuments:

==== Leiningen (main centre) ====
- Catholic Church of the Raising Aloft of Christ's Cross (branch church; Filialkirche Kreuzerhöhung Christi), Kirchstraße – quire tower, late 13th or early 14th century, aisleless church, possibly from before 1400; whole complex of buildings with graveyard
- Hauptstraße 11 – estate complex along the street, timber framing, partly slated, stable and barn, 19th century, old yard paving stones; whole complex of buildings
- Marktplatz – Gothic Revival hand-pumped cast-iron well, Rheinböllen Ironworks, latter half of the 19th century

==== Sauerbrunnen ====
- Koblenzer Straße 8 – well housing; Baroque Revival plastered building, 1911, one-floor storage hall; whole complex of buildings
