= Aulnay-sous-Bois =

- Commune
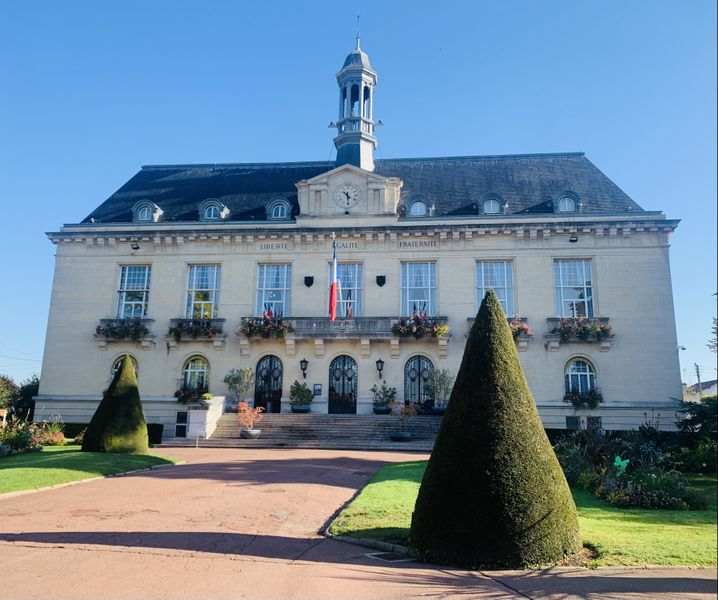
- Hôtel de Ville (town hall)

- Coat of arms

- Location (in red) within Paris inner suburbs
- Location of Aulnay-sous-Bois
- Location within France Location within Île-de-France (region)
- Coordinates: 48°56′19″N 2°29′26″E
- Country: France
- Region: Île-de-France
- Department: Seine-Saint-Denis
- Arrondissement: Le Raincy
- Canton: Aulnay-sous-Bois
- Intercommunality: Grand Paris; EPT Paris Terres Envol

Government
  - Mayor (2026–32): Bruno Beschizza
- Area^{1}: 16.2 km^{2} (6.3 sq mi)
- Elevation: 32 m (105 ft)
- Population (2023): 87,599
  - Density: 5,410/km^{2} (14,000/sq mi)
- Time zone: UTC+01:00 (CET)
  - Summer (DST): UTC+02:00 (CEST)
- INSEE/Postal code: 93005 /93600
- ^{1} French Land Register data, which excludes lakes, ponds, glaciers > 1 km^{2} (0.386 sq mi or 247 acres) and river estuaries.

Aulnay-sous-Bois (French pronunciation: [o(l)nɛ su bwɑ]) is a commune in the Seine-Saint-Denis department in the Île-de-France region in the north-eastern suburbs of Paris, France. It is located 13.9 km (8.6 mi) from the Kilometre zero of France.

The commune has been awarded four flowers by the National Council of Towns and Villages in Bloom in the Competition of cities and villages in Bloom.

== Geography ==
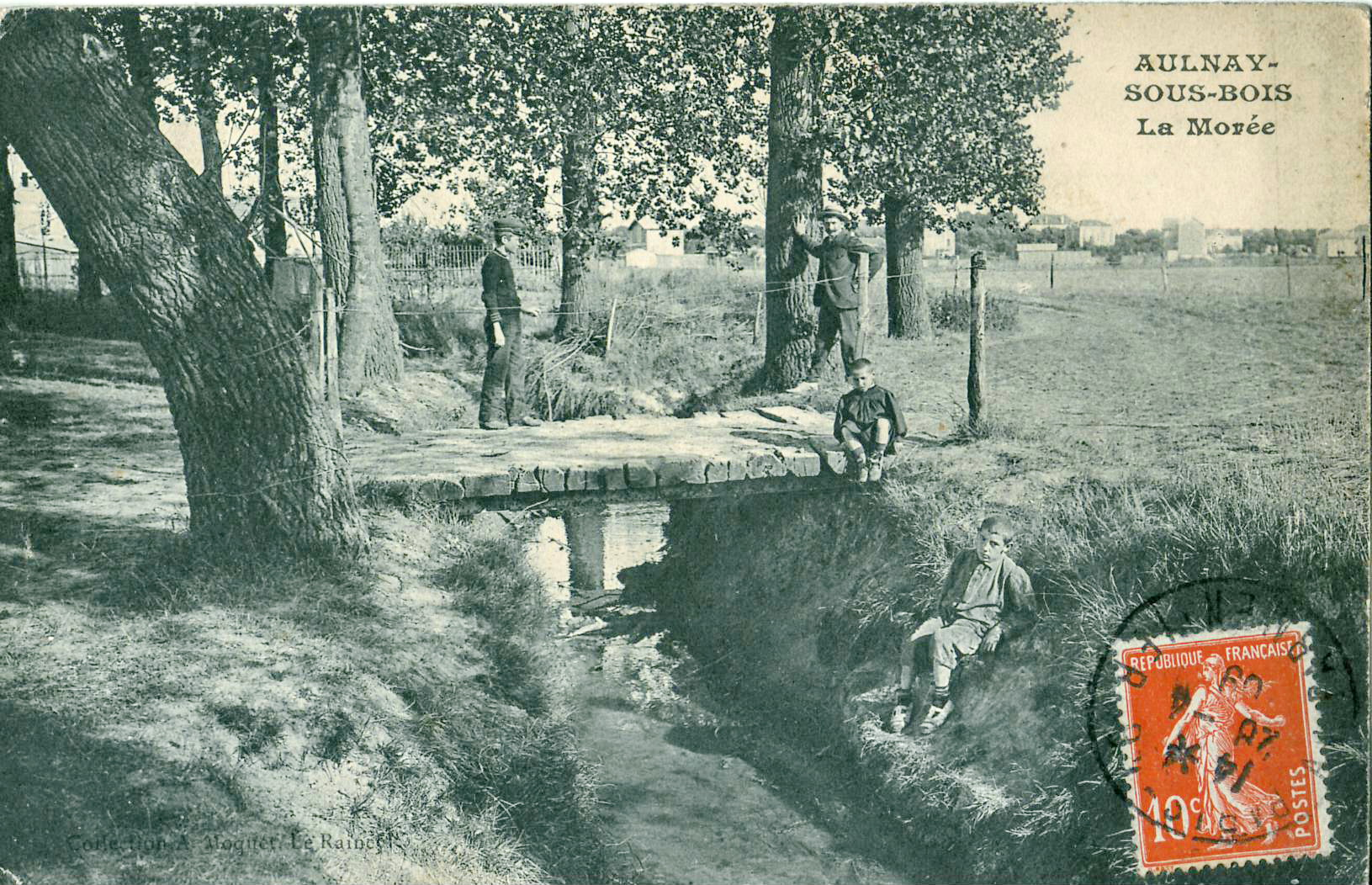
Aulnay once had a stream: the Morée. It has long been piped into a departmental sewer

=== Situation ===
Aulnay-sous-Bois is located in the Paris area and is 19 km north-east of Notre-Dame Cathedral, 1 km east of Le Bourget Airport, and 5 km south-west of Charles de Gaulle Airport. The commune stretches over a length of 6.5 km from north to south and a width ranging from 1.4 to 4.3 km from east to west and covers an area of 1,620 hectares.

The town is surrounded by the A3 autoroute in the west which joins the A1 autoroute in the north. Route nationale 2 passes through the heart of the commune from west to east with the N370 coming from the south-east along the eastern border to join the N2. The D44 passes through from north-west to south-east and the D115 from Bobigny in the south-west passes through the centre and continues to Villepinte in the east. The Ourcq Canal passes through the south-eastern end, adjacent to Livry-Gargan.

Distribution of urban zones is:

- Residential: 44%
- Industrial: 30%
- Housing Estates: 11%
- Natural areas (parks): 15%

=== Districts ===
- The north of Aulnay-sous-Bois consists of large housing estates (including the City of 3000 and Milles-Milles), industrial areas (PSA Peugeot Citroën, Garonor, and O'Parinor), and parks (Robert Ballanger Park and Sausset Park):
  - The Rose des Vents (also known as the City of 3000 in reference to the number of dwellings constructed)
  - The Etangs (Ponds) (there are the East Etangs - also called Les Nénuphars, and the West Etangs)
  - The Merisier
  - The City of Emmaus
  - Balagny
  - La Garenne
  - Ambourget (also called Mitry or Mille-mille)
  - Savigny
  - The Gros Saule (A district categorised as a ZSP or Special Security zone)
- The central area, called the district of Vieux Pays (Old Country), is older especially with its Church of Saint-Sulpice built in the 12th century and its farm. It includes La Roseraie, Maximilien Robespierre, Le Vieux Pays, Tour Eiffel, and Hotel de Ville.
- The south, across the railway line, is wealthier and residential in nature. It consists of suburban districts and is bordered by the Canal de l'Ourcq. It includes Chanteloup, Central Station, Pont de l'Union, and Nonneville.

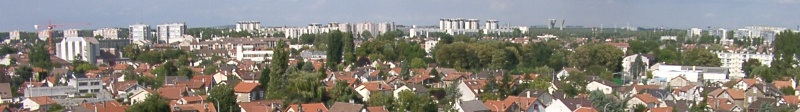
Panorama of Aulnay-sous-Bois

=== Rose-des-Vents ===
When the construction of Clos Saint-Lazare at Stains ended, urbanization of the northern districts of Aulnay-sous-Bois began. The idea was to create an area of factories. It was on this basis that the area of Rose des Vents was built in 1969 in the northern part of Aulnay-sous-Bois. This "Great Housing Estate" was built on former agricultural land. Its mission was to provide shelter for workers and managers for a new Citroën plant to be located a few hundred metres away.

Beyond the Rose des Vents, which is also known as the City of 3000, all of the housing estates in the northern districts total 6,500 housing units including 745 detached houses. 24,000 people, or 30% of the population of Aulnay-sous-Bois, are housed on 4% of the territory.

=== Communication routes ===
==== Roads ====
The city is served by:

- Autoroutes: A1, A3, A104 (the Francilienne)
- National Roads: N2 and N370
- Departmental Routes: D115, D44, D40, D401

==== SNCF Railway station, tramway ====
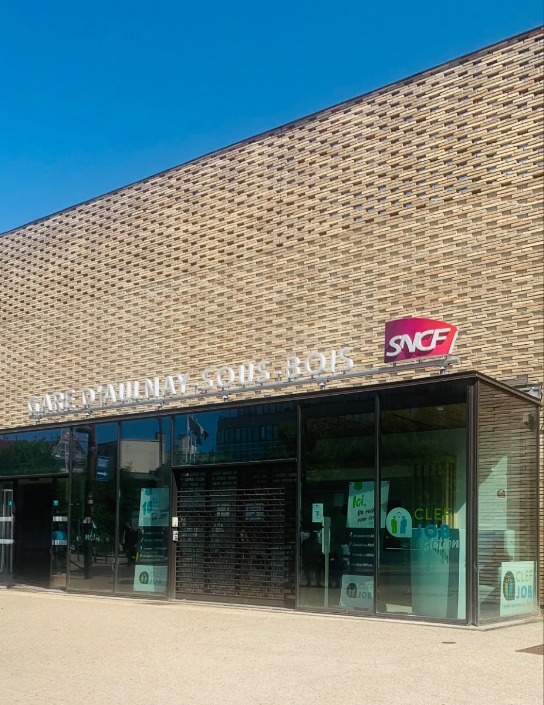
The SNCF Railway Station

The commune is traversed by the main railway line from Paris to Soissons, Laon, and Hirson which serves the Aulnay-sous-Bois station where all buses and semi-direct services of (Roissy and Mitry-Mory) and the Transilien Paris to Crépy-en-Valois (connecting with TER Villers to Cotterêts/Soissons/Laon) stop and it is the terminus of the line. The station has a park and ride with a parking fee.

Since November 2006, the classic commuter train the Ligne des Coquetiers (The Egg-cups line) between Aulnay-sous-Bois to Bondy has been replaced by a Tram-train that takes the same route and allows connection to the and. Two branches are planned: the first to Clichy-sous-Bois and Montfermeil on the Gargan heights; the second towards Garonor through Rose-des-Vents and the N370 to the heights of Rougemont-Chanteloup.

Between September 2009 to January 2011, the Aulnay-sous-Bois station has had work done to allow access to all platforms for disabled persons including: the development of four lifts, the rehabilitation of the railway station and underpasses, and the installation of new lighting. Aulnay-sous-Bois station is also served by bus routes:

- RATP Bus: 251
- TRA 605 607a 613 614 615 616a 616b 617 618 627 637 680
- Autobus du Fort 702
- CIF 15
- Noctilien: N140

Villepinte Station is located halfway between Aulnay-sous-Bois and Villepinte and it provides access to the district of Rose des Vents. Villepinte station is served by buses: TRA 609 615 617 642 683(RER) (B)(BUS).

In 2023 a station on line 16 in the Grand Paris Express project is planned north of the commune on the embankment of the former N2 road. Its platforms will be at a depth of 15 metres.

==== Bus ====
The city is served by various bus networks:

- RATP Bus: 148 251 350
- TRA 605 607a 607b 609 610 613 614 615 616a 616b 617 618 627 634 637 680 683 684 686
- Autobus du Fort 702
- CIF 1 15 32A 43 44 45 93 100
- Noctilien: N42 N140

In the medium term, it is proposed the creation of a "transverse" line by merging TRA 614 627 637 lines. In addition, it is also planned to create a circular line to connect different parts of the city to avoid "reloading" (a change of bus) for trips between all economic areas of the city and its public facilities.

==== Taxi stand ====
There is a taxi rank at Aulnay-sous-Bois station.

==== Air transport ====
Aulnay-sous-Bois is located 5 km from Charles de Gaulle Airport. The airport can be reached by (4 stations) or by the A1 and A3 autoroutes.

== Toponymy ==
"Aulnay" is a common French toponym and may derive from the Medieval Latin alnetum meaning "alder grove" after the alder trees (French: aulnes) which covered Aulnay-sous-Bois in ancient times. An alternative derivation is that Aulnay takes its name from its location in pagellus alnetenis - Aulnaye Country.

Aulnoye or Aunois was a small agricultural area in Île-de-France. It included a dozen villages and hamlets scattered between thickets, meadows and woods. The village was surrounded by the Forest of Bondy which covered most of the north-east of Paris.

The location previously bore the names Aunay, Aunais, Anay, Aunoye, Aulnaye, Aulnay-la-Fosse, Aulnay-en-France (15th century), becoming Aulnay-lès-Bondy (i.e. "Aulnay by Bondy") in 1787. The commune was renamed Aulnay-sous-Bois (i.e. "Aulnay under the woods") on 5 January 1903 in reference to the ancient Forest of Bondy. Other nearby commune names (Clichy-sous-Bois, Les Pavillons-sous-Bois, and Rosny-sous-Bois) also refer to the same forest.

== History ==
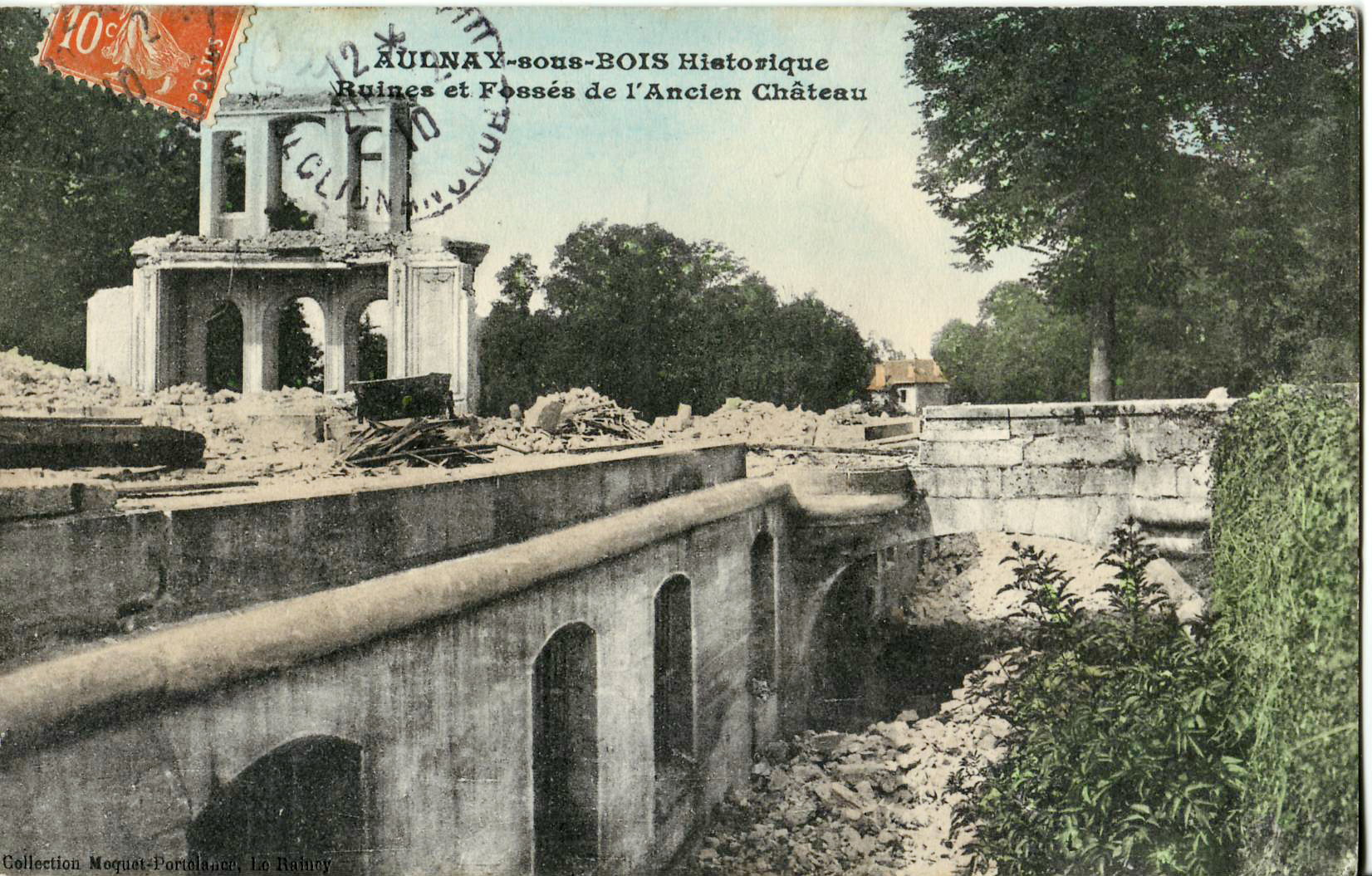
The ruins of the Château of Aulnay in the early 20th century

The area was originally settled around 6000 BC (remains found in the Valley of Sausset). Between the 4th and 2nd centuries BC, farmers living around a "villa" belonging to Sabinus - the Savigny Farm. Two places independent from the parish of Saint Sulpice were Savigny and Nonneville which were attached to the current village. Until the 15th century the lords bore the name of d'Aulnay. The lord Jacques Coitier passed succession to his heirs through his nephew to the Gourgues family. The Canal de l'Ourcq was dug during the Napoleonic period to facilitate relations with Paris. Excavation began in 1803 and the canal was opened between Paris and Claye in 1813.

The register of city council meetings shows that 13 May 1814 was the first Prussian occupation of the village. There were also Prussian occupations in 1814 and 1870. Over a long period houses were destroyed and fields remained deserted. On 15 August 1838 a postal boat service was started on the Canal de l'Ourcq from Paris to Meaux. This service stopped in 1849. In 1875, the French Northern Railway opened a station on the new Paris to Soissons line. The rise of Aulnay was largely due to this event. In 1883 the Parc district began to emerge in the south from a fragment of the Forest of Bondy. In the years which followed cohabitation between the rural community of Vieux-Pays (Old Country) and the more urban community of Parc was difficult. There was even talk of cutting the city in two: Aulnay-les-Bondy for Vieux-Pays and Aulnay-sous-Bois for Parc. The population of Aulnay rose from 780 inhabitants in 1885 to 1,012 in 1886. In 1896 the municipal council was mostly made up of inhabitants of Parc but undertook the development of the entire community of Aulnay. A school, a post office, streets, and bridges were built in the south. The creation of "worker trains" by the French Northern Railway attracted many workers to acquire land. Large properties began to fragment. Parc was sold in lots. Tempted by the greenery on the outskirts of Paris, Parisians bought land and transformed the place into a holiday and residential area.

At the beginning of the 20th century Aulnay grew through accentuation on rail traffic and installation of industries. On 5 January 1903, the city became Aulnay-sous-Bois. In September 1914 Aulnay was saved from German military occupation by the counter-offensive during the First Battle of the Marne. In 1924 the Radiator Company commenced operation and provided employment for 2,300 workers. Other small mechanical or chemical industries also moved to Aulnay. Between 1920 and 1931 most of the housing estates were completed. In 1935 the population of the housing estates represented approximately 40% of the total population of Aulnay. In 1955 the large rural area in the north of the commune began to urbanize: large multi-family housing estates were planned and built. In 1962 the first group of buildings at Merisiers was built.

In 1969 and 1970 a housing zone of 3,000 housing units was built in the district of Rose des Vents. In 1971 the Citroën company opened its first factory in the Paris region north of the city. By 1985 Aulnay was completely urbanized. At that date the extension of the northern part and the establishment of industrial zones was complete. Many facilities were added in the districts and gave the city its present face.

=== Heraldry ===
Arms of Aulnay-sous-Bois	Blazon: Or, an alder eradicated proper.

== Politics ==
=== Administration ===
Since the French canton reform, which came into effect in March 2015, Aulnay-sous-Bois forms one canton: Canton of Aulnay-sous-Bois.

The city is part of the Syndicat d'équipement et d'aménagement des Pays de France et de l'Aulnoye (Facilities and development association of Pays de France and Aulnoye) (SEAPFA).

The Hôtel de Ville was completed in 1934.

=== Administrative changes ===
Until 1787, the parish of Aulnay was part of the province of Île-de-France, Prévôté, Généralité, Élection de Paris, Subdélégation de Saint-Denis. In 1787, during the formation of the department of Saint-Germain, the village of Aulnay was within the jurisdiction of Gonesse. In 1790 Aulnay was part of the department of Seine-et-Oise, of the canton and district of Gonesse.

In 1801 Aulnay became Aulnay-lès-Bondy and was part of the arrondissement of Pontoise. In 1903 Aulnay-lès-Bondy became Aulnay-sous-Bois. The first Canton of Aulnay-sous-Bois was founded in 1922 and included Blanc-Mesnil, Sevran, Villepinte, and Tremblay-les-Gonesse. From 1964 the city formed a Canton of Aulnay alone. Aulnay-sous-Bois, previously under the Department of Seine-et-Oise and the arrondissement of Pontoise, was attached to the new department of Seine-Saint-Denis, Arrondissement of Le Raincy, under the Act of 10 July 1964. This reform came into force on 1 January 1968. Between July 1967 and March 2015, Aulnay-sous-Bois was divided into two separate electoral districts and had two councillors.

=== Mayors ===
The 2008 French municipal elections in Aulnay-sous-Bois were annulled on 2 October 2008 by the Administrative Court of Cergy-Pontoise due to putting up posters in the night before the second round of municipal elections, which violated a ban on late campaigning. An appeal was brought before the Council of State and the municipal council and the elections in March 2008 remained in place until the court's decision. The elections were finally validated after the decision of the court.

Mayors from the French Revolution to 1939

From	To	Name	Party	Position
1787	1791	François Noël Chartier		
1791	1792	Christophe Bazureau		
1792	1795	Pierre Coqueret		
1795	1798	Louis Delacourt		
1798	1799	Louis Boileau		
1799	1800	Pierre Andelle		
1800	1808	François Chartier		
1808	1830	Auguste Fançois de Gourgues		
1830	1833	Félix Fessard		
1833	1840	Jean Benoît Ciquard		
1840	1844	François Jérôme Langlois		
1844	1860	Louis Antoine Dalleux		
1866	1893	Dominique Armand de Gourgues		
1893	1896	Marie Alexandre Depre		
1896	1905	Claude Buchet		
1905	1919	Isidore Nerat		
1919	1924	Jules Princent		
1925	1928	Albert Libs		
1928	1930	Arthur Chevalier		
1930	1932	Charles Dordain		
1932	1935	Louis Poupon		
1935	1939	Maurice Nilès		

Mayors from 1939

From	To	Name	Party	Position
1939	1941	Henri Fourquez		
1941	1944	Charles Drocourt		
1944	1944	Jean Perlis		
1944	1944	Narcisse Renaudot		
1944	1945	Maurice Nilès	PCF	
1945	1947	Pierre Scohy	PCF	
1947	1959	Fernand Herbaut	SFIO	
1959	1964	Robert Courtat	SFIO	
1964	1965	Maurice Cadot	SFIO	
1965	1971	Louis Solbès	PCF	
1971	1977	Robert Ballanger	PCF	
1977	1983	Pierre Thomas	PCF	
1983	1983	Gilbert Seron		
1983	2003	Jean-Claude Abrioux	UMP	
2003	2008	Gérard Gaudron	UMP	
2008	2014	Gérard Ségura	PS	
2014	2032	Bruno Beschizza	LR	

== Demographics ==
According to INSEE (2004), the average household income is €15,000. Much of the upper-middle class lives in the south of the town. The canton of Aulnay-Sud has a very different character from the canton of Aulnay-Nord, owing to differences in education and wages. For example, the average income in the south of the town is around €20,000 - €25,000 (2004), much higher than the national average of €15,000 (2004). Furthermore, the north (Aulnay-Nord) has a high number of HLM (public housing). There is even a political divide, with Aulnay-Nord Canton sending a Socialist representative (Gerard Segura) to the Council-General for the Seine-Saint-Denis Department, but Aulnay-Sud a conservative (Jacques Chaussat).

=== Immigration ===
Place of birth of residents of Aulnay-sous-Bois in 1999
Born in metropolitan France	Born outside metropolitan France			
71.9%	28.1%			
71.9%	Born in overseas France	Born in foreign countries with French citizenship at birth^{1}	EU-15 immigrants^{2}	Non-EU-15 immigrants
71.9%	2.9%	2.6%	3.4%	19.2%
^{1} This group is made up largely of former French settlers, such as pieds-noirs in Northwest Africa, followed by former colonial citizens who had French citizenship at birth (such as was often the case for the native elite in French colonies), as well as to a lesser extent foreign-born children of French expatriates. A foreign country is understood as a country not part of France in 1999, so a person born for example in 1950 in Algeria, when Algeria was an integral part of France, is nonetheless listed as a person born in a foreign country in French statistics.^{2} An immigrant is a person born in a foreign country not having French citizenship at birth. An immigrant may have acquired French citizenship since moving to France, but is still considered an immigrant in French statistics. On the other hand, persons born in France with foreign citizenship (the children of immigrants) are not listed as immigrants.

As of circa 1998 there were about 3,000 persons of East and Southeast Asian origin in Aulnay, while there were a total of 6,000 living in the area around Aulnay. Most of them were of Cambodian origin, including those with and without Cambodian citizenship. The commune also had an above-average number of persons of Laotian origin, including those with and without Laotian citizenship. Ethnicities included Khmer people, Lao people, and Overseas Chinese.

Many Asian families in Aulnay arrived in the period 1982 through 1990. As of circa 1998 most of the Asians in Aulnay resided in Les Trois Mille, a social housing estate, mainly due to a social agency wanting to increase ethnic diversity in a predominately North African area.

As of circa 1998 there were about 1,280 Asians in the Aulnay area active in the job market, and about 100 of the ethnic Chinese in the Aulnay area worked in Belleville and the 13th arrondissement of Paris. Even though Citroën factories are in proximity to Tres Trois Mille, relatively less than 88 of the Asians in Aulnay work in the factories.

=== Political trends and results ===
For the 2007 elections Aulnay-sous-Bois was one of 82 communes with more than 3,500 people to use voting machines. They have been used for all polling stations since the 2004 European elections. The municipal council elected in 2008 decided to return to vote by paper ballots.

=== Twinning ===
Aulnay-sous-Bois has twinning associations with:

- Rufisque (Senegal) since 2011.
- Northern Rotterdam (Netherlands).
- Al-Ram (Palestine) since 2010.
- Saïdia (Morocco) since 2012.

=== Demography ===
The inhabitants of the commune are known as Aulnaysiens or Aulnaysiennes in French.

Historical population

Year	Pop.	±% p.a.
1793	580	—
1800	536	−1.12%
1806	563	+0.82%
1821	513	−0.62%
1831	577	+1.18%
1836	584	+0.24%
1841	611	+0.91%
1846	622	+0.36%
1851	637	+0.48%
1856	646	+0.28%
1861	646	+0.00%
1866	680	+1.03%
1872	627	−1.34%
1876	765	+5.10%
1881	780	+0.39%
1886	1,012	+5.35%
1891	1,306	+5.23%
1896	1,878	+7.54%
1901	2,829	+8.54%

Year	Pop.	±% p.a.
1906	4,417	+9.32%
1911	7,141	+10.08%
1921	11,928	+5.26%
1926	21,636	+12.65%
1931	31,426	+7.75%
1936	31,763	+0.21%
1946	32,356	+0.19%
1954	38,534	+2.21%
1962	47,507	+2.65%
1968	61,521	+4.40%
1975	78,137	+3.47%
1982	75,996	−0.40%
1990	82,314	+1.00%
1999	80,021	−0.31%
2007	82,513	+0.38%
2012	81,899	−0.15%
2017	85,740	+0.92%
2023	87,599	+0.36%

Source: EHESS and INSEE

The Centre for Strategic Analysis conducted a study on the city: the extract below tends to reflect a bad reputation, not necessarily deserved in all its aspects.

"It would be wrong to present Aulnay simply as a disadvantaged commune. It is a city which is composed in part of professions, middle, and senior management. It is also a city with important economic resources - three economic centres are located there: a PSA Peugeot Citroën factory, a L'Oréal group centre, and a Garanor centre of economic activity..."

In 2011 Aulnay-sous-Bois was the 55th most populated commune in France.

== Economy ==
The city had good growth due to companies like L'Oréal and PSA Peugeot Citroën being located there. There are concerns, however, resulting from the departure of Xerox France and the fears that plague the Citroën plant.

=== Statistics ===
Aulnay-sous-Bois had 3,398 business enterprises in 2012 and 622 new enterprises were created in that year.

=== Large companies ===
- Aulnay-sous-Bois is home to the largest company in the department: Peugeot-Citroën Aulnay with over 5,000 employees and a production of about 400,000 vehicles per year.

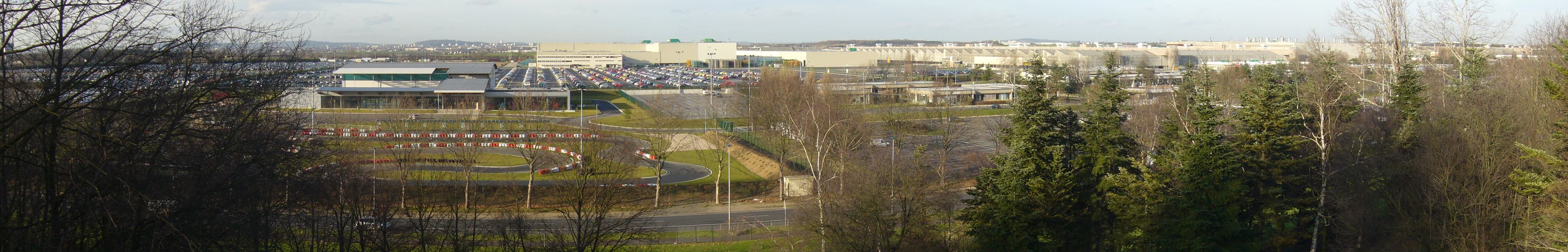
The Peugeot-Citroën Aulnay factory from Robert Ballanger park

- L'Oréal is located in the commune (a street and a pathway in the city bear the name of its founder Eugène Schueller), with a factory in the north and a research centre in the south.
- The Garonor logistics park has many freight companies.
- The O'Parinor regional mall (see shopping).

The city itself employs nearly 2,400 people and thus constitutes one of the largest employers in the town (see Administrative Staff).

Major companies headquartered in Aulnay-sous-Bois Data 2003
Name	Activity	Turnover (000s)	Website
XEROX-FRANCE (Xerox France left Aulnay-sous-Bois in 2007)	Office equipment & IT	€996,565	www.xerox.fr
GAUX PHARMA DEPOTS	pharmaceutical warehousing	€410,951
SOPROREAL (L’ORÉAL)	Cosmetics	€140,200	www.loreal.fr
XEROX DOCUMENT SUPPLIES	Office consumables	€68,707
POWER CONTROLS-FRANCE (VYNCKIER)	Electrical equipment	€58,888
FREIGHT LOGISTICS	Freight Transport	€32,759
GARONOR (AGF)	Warehousing	€30,819
PARIS NORD AUTOMOBILES	Auto Dealers	€30,265
SOLDIS	Coatings	€28,956

=== Automotive production ===
In May 1973 it was reported that the first Citroën DS had emerged from the production line at Citroën's new plant at Aulnay. The plant has subsequently produced various Citroën and Peugeot models and has on occasion hit the headlines as a focus of industrial strife. On 12 July 2012 PSA Peugeot Citroën announced that it will permanently close the Aulnay-sous-Bois plant due to overcapacity.

Aulnay is also the site of the subterranean Citroën repository of Citroën archives and 370 Citroën cars produced over the years. The repository, established in 2002, is not open to the public although members of Citroën enthusiasts' clubs and other important visitors are occasionally granted access to it.

=== Shops ===
The O'Parinor regional mall is located in the commune.

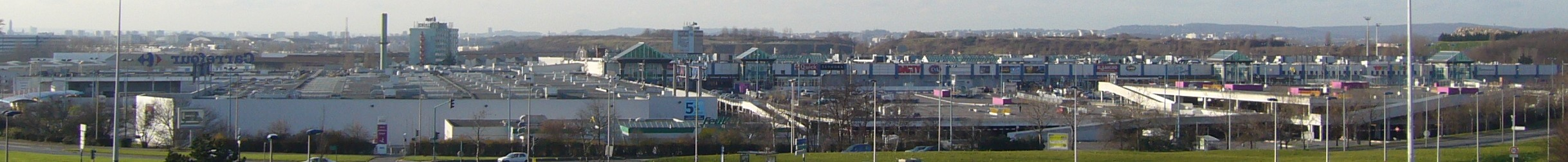
The O'Parinor regional mall from Robert Ballanger park

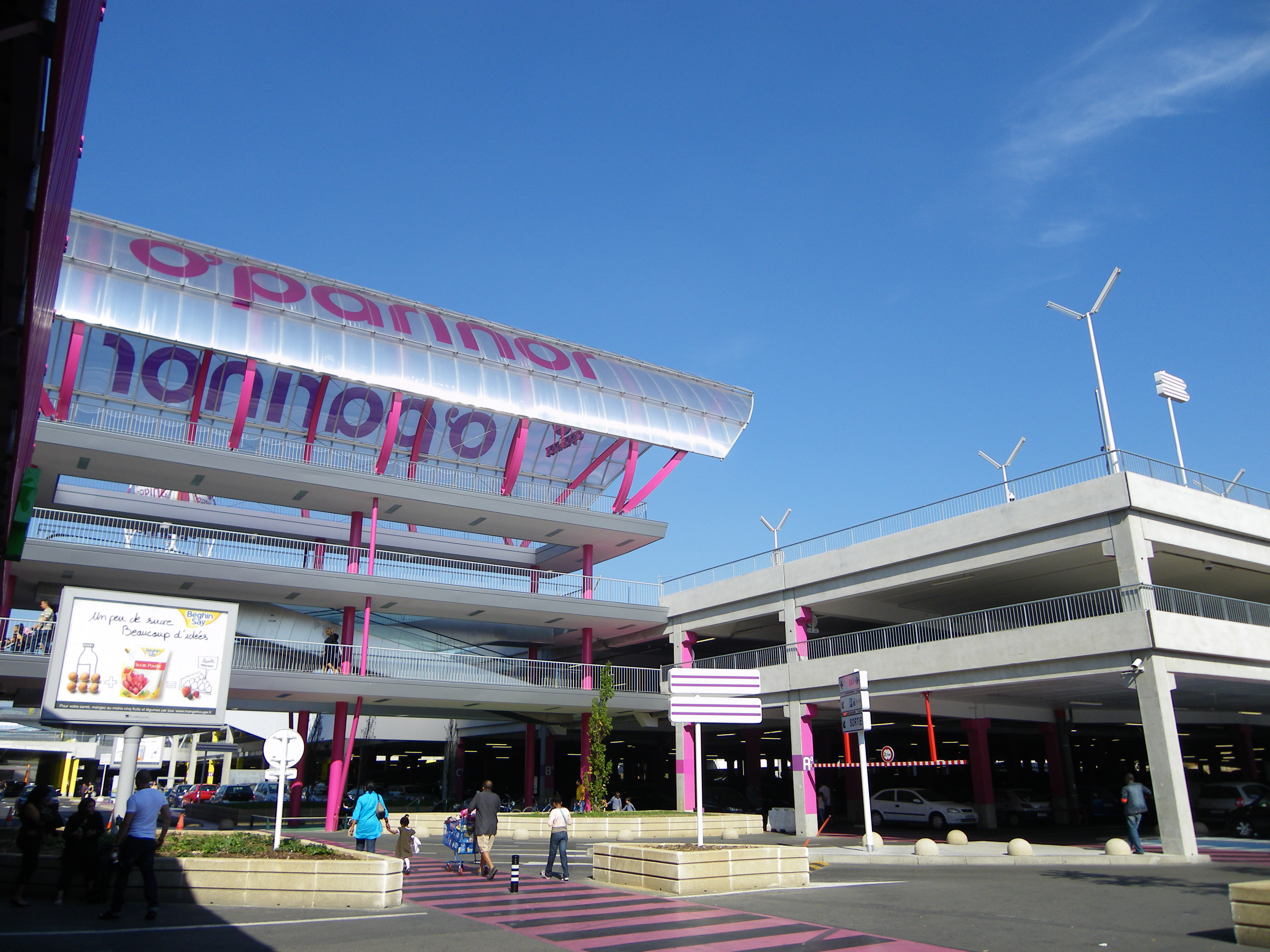
Parking area at O'Parinor in September 2009

There is an Intermarché Hypermarket in Chanteloup.

There is at least one market every day from Tuesday through Sunday:

- At Galion in the heart of Rose des Vents: Tuesdays, Fridays, and Sundays
- At Vieux-Pays: Wednesdays and Saturdays
- On the Boulevard de Strasbourg: Tuesdays, Thursdays, and Sundays

Two markets were held on the Place des Etangs and in the Ambourget district without success.

== Culture and heritage ==
=== Civil heritage ===
The commune has a number of buildings which contain items registered as historical objects:

- The Savigny Farm contains a Group sculpture: Saint Antoine (14th century)
- The Church Square contains 12a Group sculpture: Saint Antoine (14th century)

=== Religious heritage ===
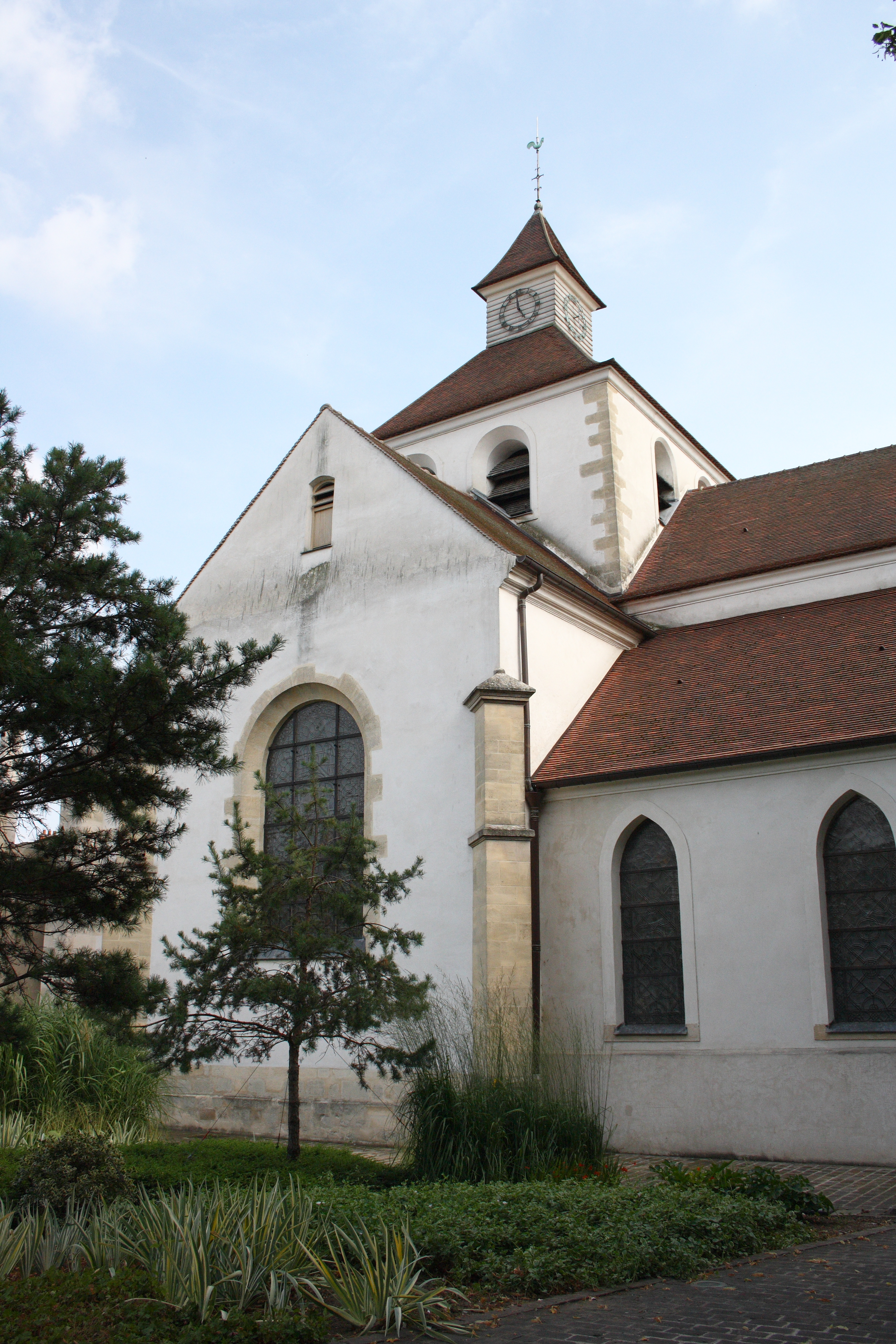
The Church of Saint-Sulpice

The commune has one religious building that is registered as a historical monument:

- The Church of Saint-Sulpice (12th century). The Church contains many items that are registered as historical objects:
  - 12 Anagogic Stained glass windows (20th century)
  - 2 Tombstones of Elisabeth Guibillon and Jeanne Berson (17th century)
  - A Painting: Christ and Saint Mary Magdalene (18th century)
  - A Painting: Saint Vincent de Paul (19th century)
  - A Painting: The meal of Emaus (1711)
  - A Tombstone of Thomas Michel (1665)
  - A Tombstone of Jacques Longer (1711)
  - A Tombstone of Louis Le Clerc de Cottier (1679)
  - A Tombstone of Robert la Nesle (1745)
  - A Painting: The meal of Emaus (1713)
  - A Painting: Saint Roch and the plague (18th century)
  - A Silver plate and 2 Silver Cruets (1826)
  - A Statue: Virgin and Child (17th century)
  - A Console (18th century)
  - 2 Sculptures: Angels seated holding a shield (18th century)
  - 10 decorative windows (19th century)
  - 2 stained glass windows of Saint Dominique and Saint Roch (1865)
  - 2 stained glass windows of the Assumption and the Resurrection (1866)

Other churches contain items registered as historical objects:

- The Chapel of Saint-Paul d'Ambourget contains abstract stained glass windows (20th century)
- The Church of Saint-Joseph at 57 Avenue de la Croix-Blanche contains:
  - 10 stained glass windows depicting saints (1934–1940)
  - 2 stained glass windows of Saint Adrien and Saint Martha (1934)
  - 2 stained glass windows of Saint Mary (1942)
  - 2 stained glass windows of Bon Pasteur and the Virgin and Child (20th century)
  - A stained glass window consecrated at Saint Joseph (1920)
- The Church of Saint-Pierre of Nonneville at 54 Rue de Reims contains:
  - 10 geometric stained glass windows (20th century)
  - An abstract stained glass window (20th century)

=== Parks ===
Aulnay has 153 hectares of green space of which these are the main ones:

- Sausset departmental Park traversing both Aulnay-sous-Bois and Villepinte (200 hectares - the 2nd largest in the department)

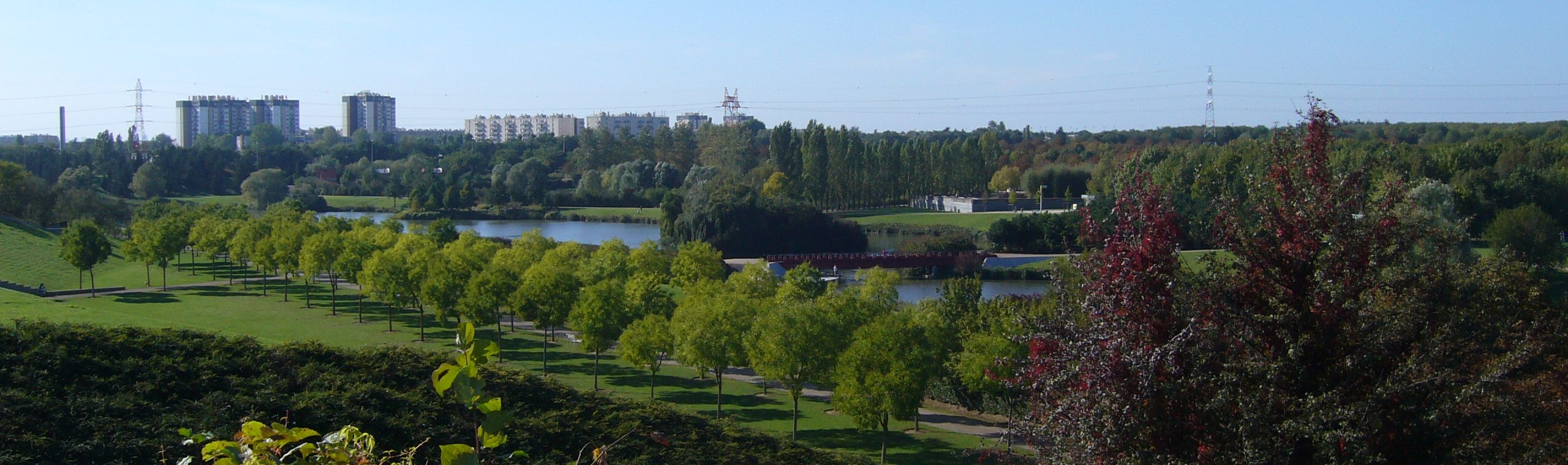
The Sausset departmental park and the City of 3000 (Rose des Vents) in the background

- Robert Ballanger communal park (29 hectares), with a lookout where the Eiffel Tower and Sacré-Cœur can be seen

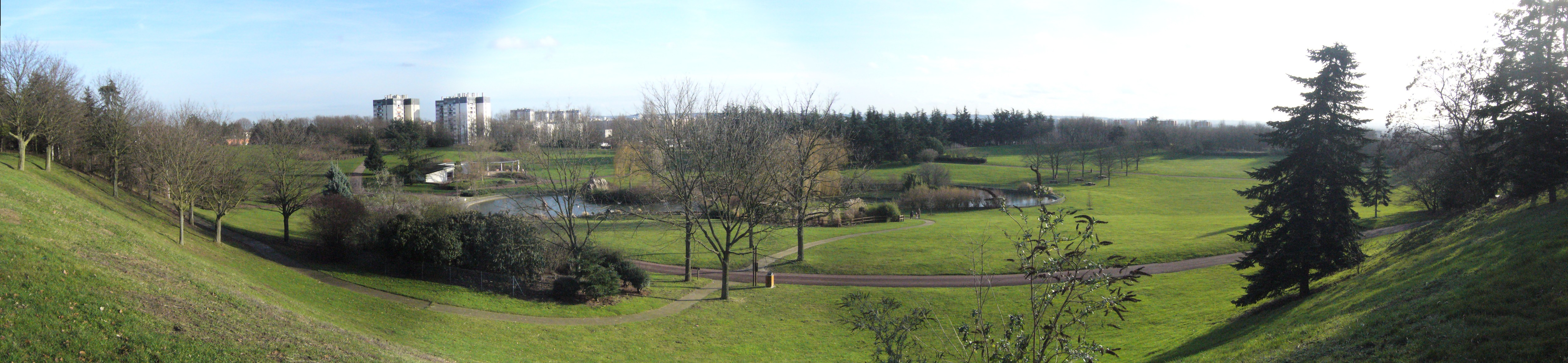
Robert Ballanger Park and the City of 3000 (Rose des Vents) in the background

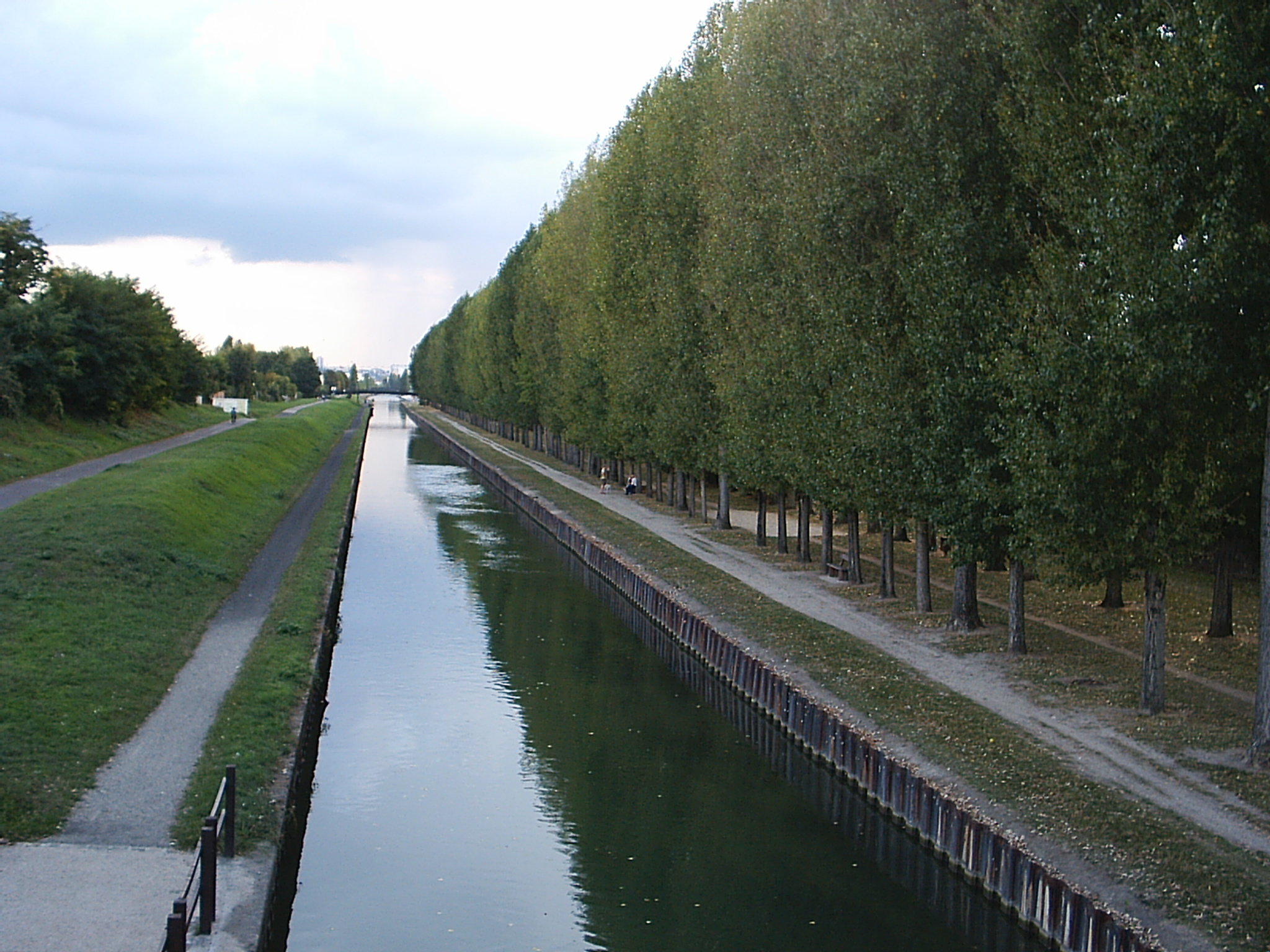
The banks of the Canal de l'Ourcq

- Dumont Park, avenue Dumont
- Gainville Park, park of swans, rue de Sevran (7.6 hectares), next to the Gainville House - the oldest house in Aulnay (dating to the 17th century)
- Émile Zola Park, boulevard Émile Zola (4.4 hectares)
- Faure Park, circular road (9 hectares)
- Bigottini Park, avenue de la Croix-Blanche
- Honoré Daumier Rose Garden, avenue du Maréchal juin (8 hectares and 2,500 rose plants)
- Banks of the Canal de l'Ourcq
- Serres municipales, rue Auguste Renoir

== Facilities ==
=== Cultural Facilities ===
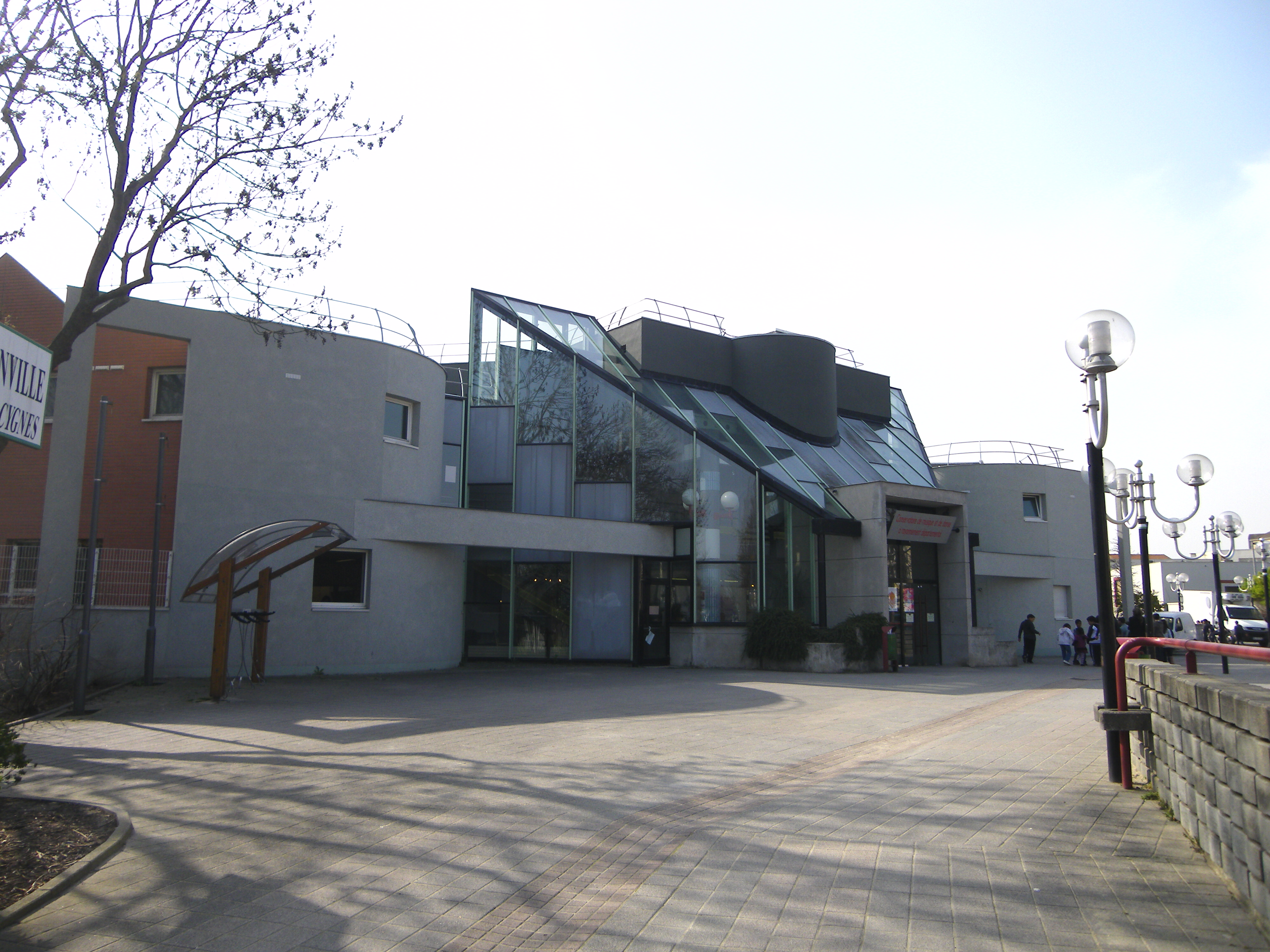
The Conservatory of Music

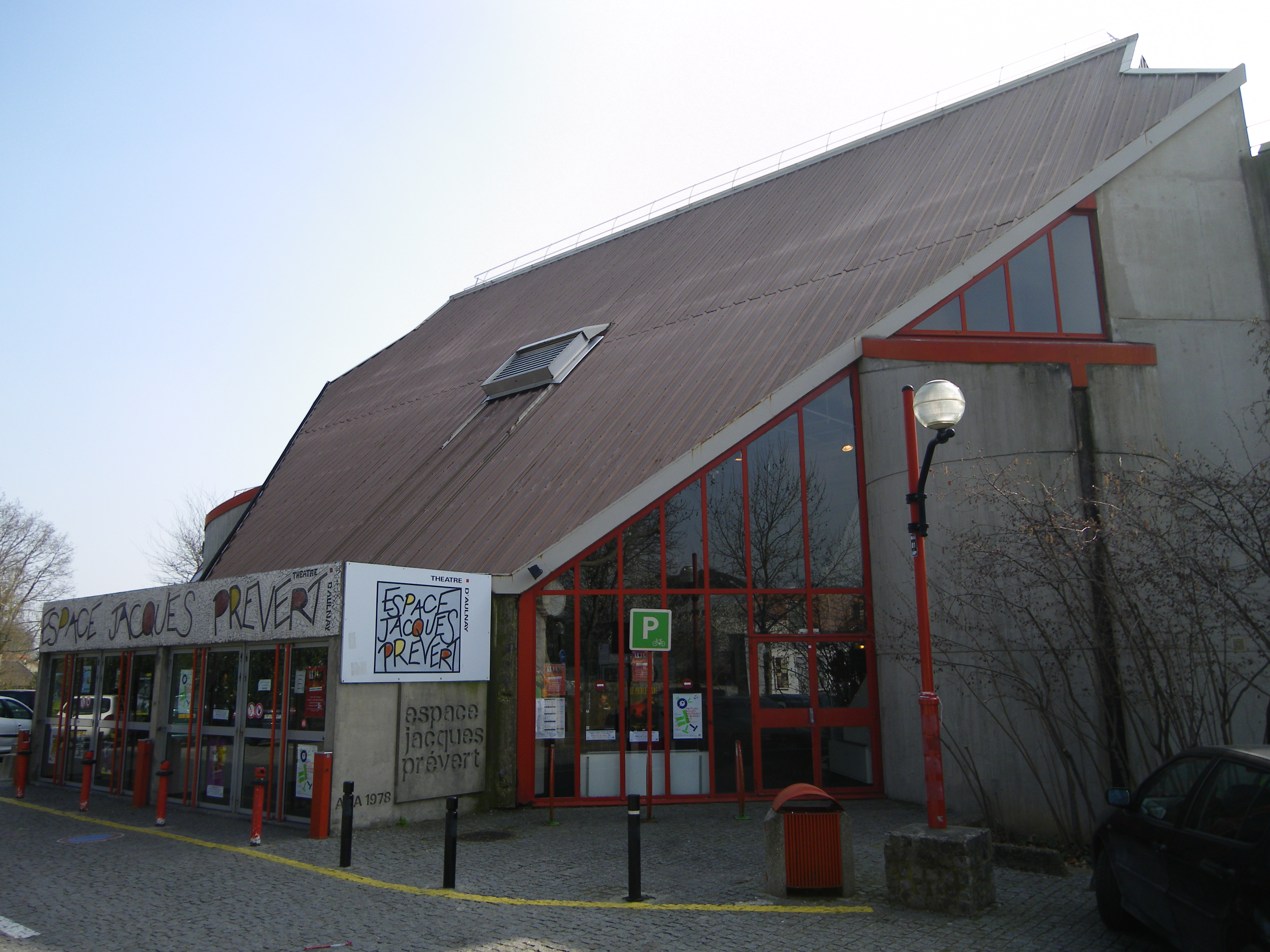
The Jacques Prévert Theatre and cinema

- The Jacques Prévert Theatre and cinema is a multi-cultural centre that offers diverse live entertainment programming for both adults and young audiences. It can accommodate 100,000 spectators annually and offers throughout the year: theatre, dance, songs, and opera. It is also a cinema. The two theatres (the largest of which accommodates 700 seats) show twenty films per month.
- The CAP is a cultural facility dedicated to contemporary music and all kinds of music from around the world. It is a venue with a theatre with a capacity of over 500 people and holds about four to five concerts per month. It also offers education through 17 workshops for instrumental practice at every level: percussion, string instruments, wind instruments, guitar etc. as well as in vocal technique and gospel singing. Supporting young talent is also one of the objectives of the CAP. Three rehearsal studios and a resource centre are available for amateur musicians to help them realize their projects, information on contracts, intermittent status of the show, the addresses of places to play, and many other functions.
- The Conservatory of Music and Dance is a departmental branch (CRD) which offers individual and group courses for children from the age of 4. It is possible to choose from: Accordion, Viola, Bassoon, Clarinet, Harpsichord, Bass, Horn, Flute, Guitar, Harp, Oboe, Piano, Percussion, Saxophone, Trombone, Trumpet, Tuba, Violin, and Cello.
- The Dance Centre of Galion welcomes and supports youth in their artistic activities with three rehearsal studios, work experience, and regular courses. It is recognized as a Centre of Resources for Amateur Dancing Practice in Ile-de-France. To promote dance in all its forms it organizes meetings between different experiences, expressions, and supports the creation of young choreographers.
- The Claude Monet School of Art is one of the largest non-degree schools in France. It is open to children and adults. Twelve teachers educate nearly 800 apprentice artists every year and introduce techniques from different artistic disciplines to them: drawing, painting, printmaking, tapestry, photography, ceramics, sculpture, cartoon, graphic design, and art history. Their teaching mission is completed by the design, organization, and presentation of exhibitions promoting the encounter between the public and works of art.
- The CREA is a unique arts educational structure in France. It is established at the Jacques Prévert theatre and plans to build a centre in Vieux Pays. Its director, Didier Grosjman, and his team have realized many projects with schools, colleges, autistic children, students, and teachers. Four "permanent" courses have been offered since its inception 25 years ago:
  - L'éveil (Awakening) for children between 7–8 years old
  - avant-scène (Forestage) for those 8 to 11 years old
  - chœur de scène (choir stage) for children 10–18 years who play at the Opéra Bastille and Opéra de Vichy
  - Créa'tures, the choir of young adults.

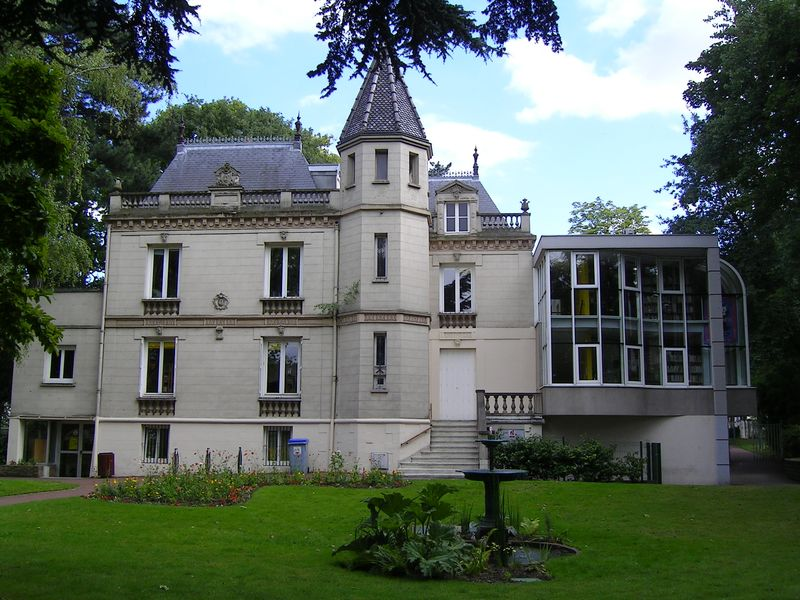
Dumont Library

- 5 libraries and a Mediabus:
  - Dumont library, Boulevard du General Gallieni
  - Guillaume Apollinaire Library, rue Turgot
  - Alphonse Daudet Library, rue du Hameau
  - Jules Verne Library, rue du Limousin
  - Elsa Triolet Library, Saturn Street
  - A Sound library, rue Roger Contensin

=== Cultural events and festivals ===
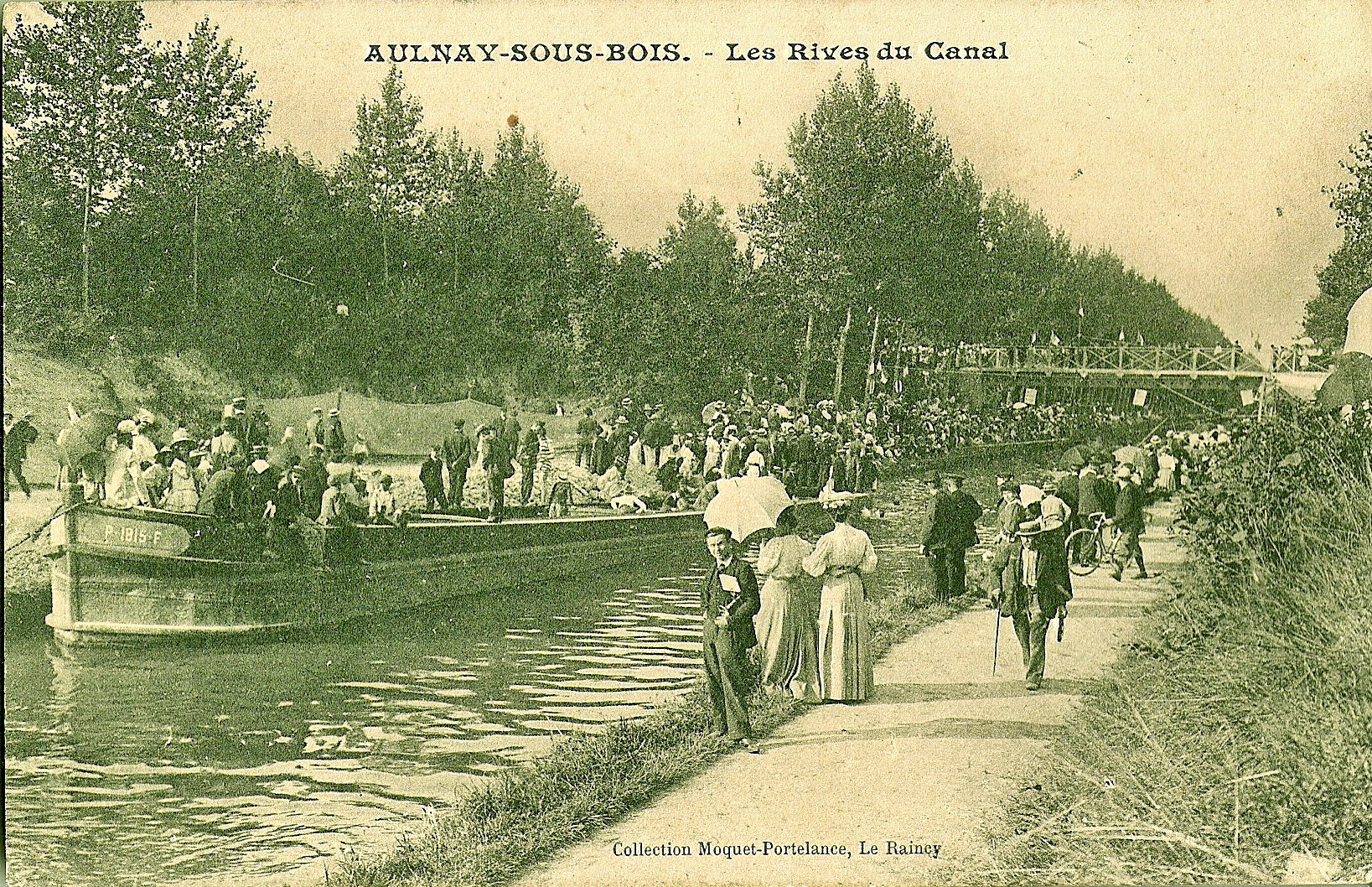
Perhaps a precursor to the Festival of the Canal de l'Ourcq (Postcard from the beginning of the 20th century)

In 1981 and 1982, Aulnay-sous-Bois was a stage town for the 68th and 69th Tour de France during the 10th stage (Le Mans-Aulnay-sous-Bois) in 1982 and for the 20th stage in 1982 (Sens-Aulnay-sous-Bois).

Every winter an outdoor skating rink (600 metres square in 2006–2007) is installed at the Vieux Pays Farm.

Every Easter Monday there is a Spring Fair that combines antiques, a flea market, and a garage sale. It brings together about 1,500 exhibitors between Vieux Pays and the Place du General Leclerc.

The Jacques Prévert Theatre and cinema stages Les Panoramiques festival in May - a festival of artistic practices for amateurs. It unites for one week different theatrical companies of children, adolescents, and adults who present their creations on stage.

Every year in November is the Aulnay All Blues festival.

In early June there is the Festival of Towns in Flower and Cycling in Gainville (Parc des Cygnes) Park.

A Festival of Military Music is scheduled on the second Saturday of June. Groups from several European countries are invited. In the morning a parade is held in the city from Dumont Park followed by an outdoor concert at Dumont Park. In the afternoon there is a parade from the Vieux Pays Farm and a concert in the Pierre Scohy gymnasium.

The Festival of the Canal de l'Ourcq is held in mid-June between the Pavilions-sous-Bois port and the Jardins Perdus Gateway.

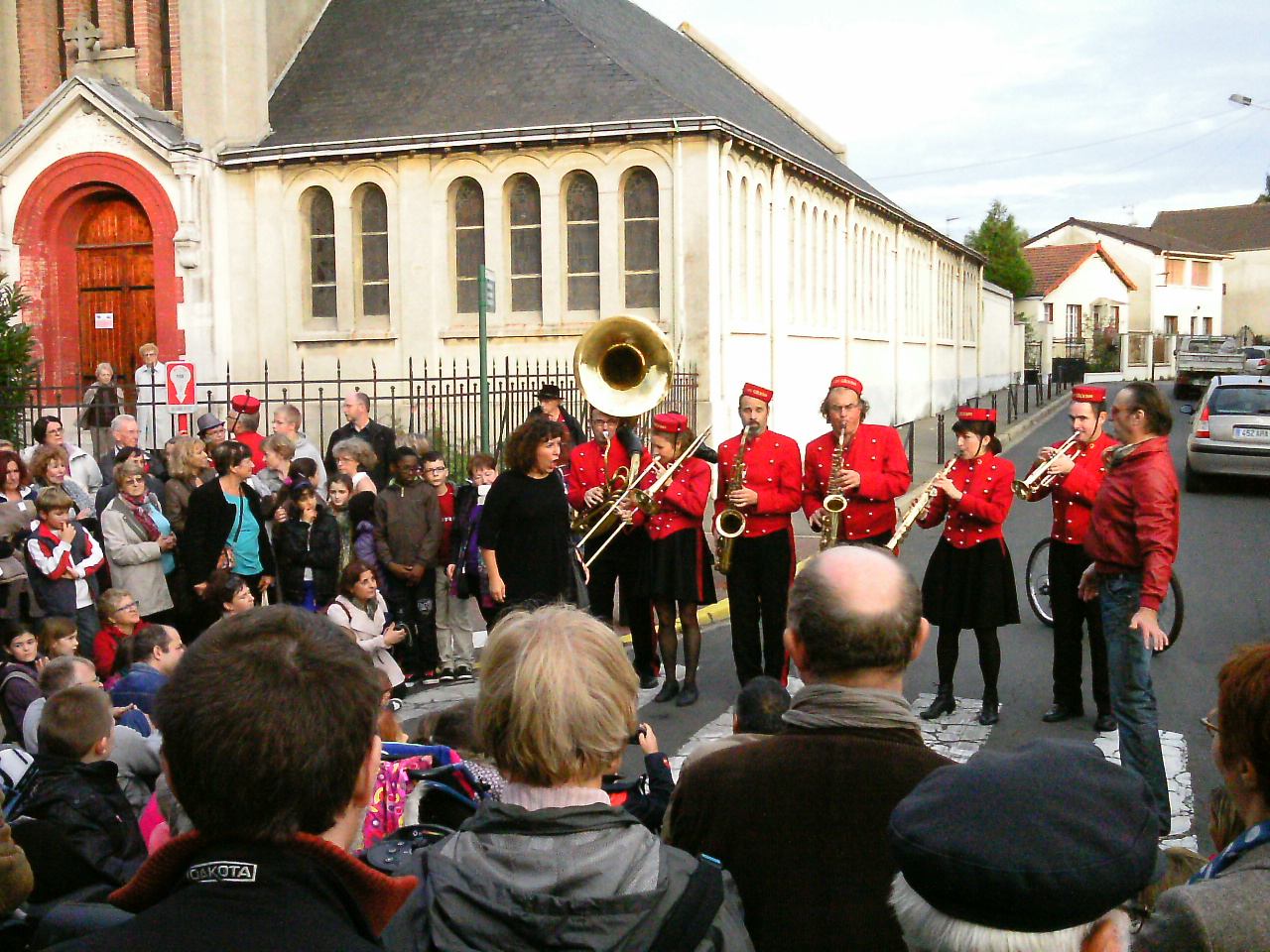
One of the events in the Festival on Military Music in 2013

The traditional Festival of the Tree takes place for two days in early November at Dumont Park. There are organized exhibitions and workshops for children focused around trees, nature, and wildlife. The adventure trail from tree to tree is free for all.

The festival of hip-hop, H2O (A Hip Hop Organization), is organized by the Centre de Danse du Galion in partnership with the Jacques Prévert Theatre and cinema and the current music scene Le Cap in December. Over the past 10 years it has brought together the avant-garde of the French hip-hop scene.

The Battle VNR, every last Sunday of May, is a break-dance hip-hop event which has been running since 2002.

The city hosted the 2012 Boxing Championship of France.

Les Futuriales Festival takes place every year in Dumont Park since 2010. It has for its theme literature of the imagination and has more than 60 authors in one day. It is co-organized by the Librarie Folies d'Encre and the network of libraries.

=== Education ===
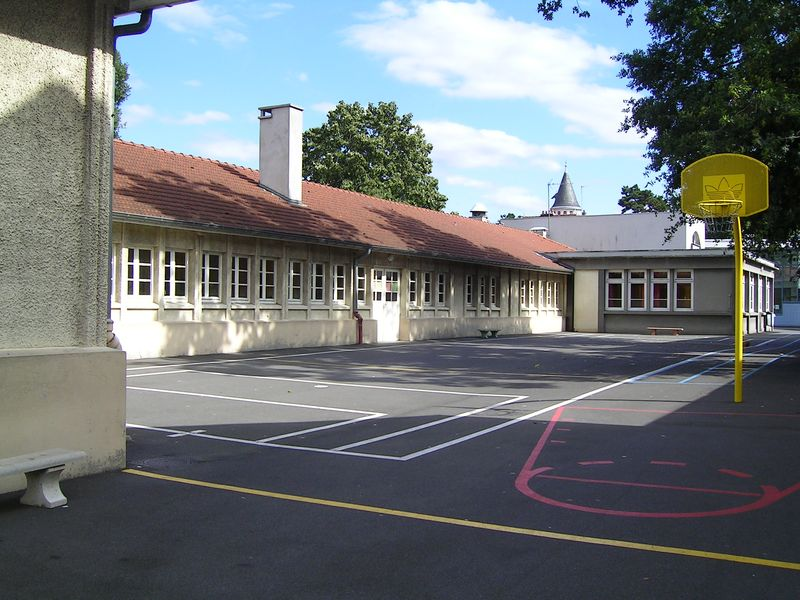
Le Parc Primary School

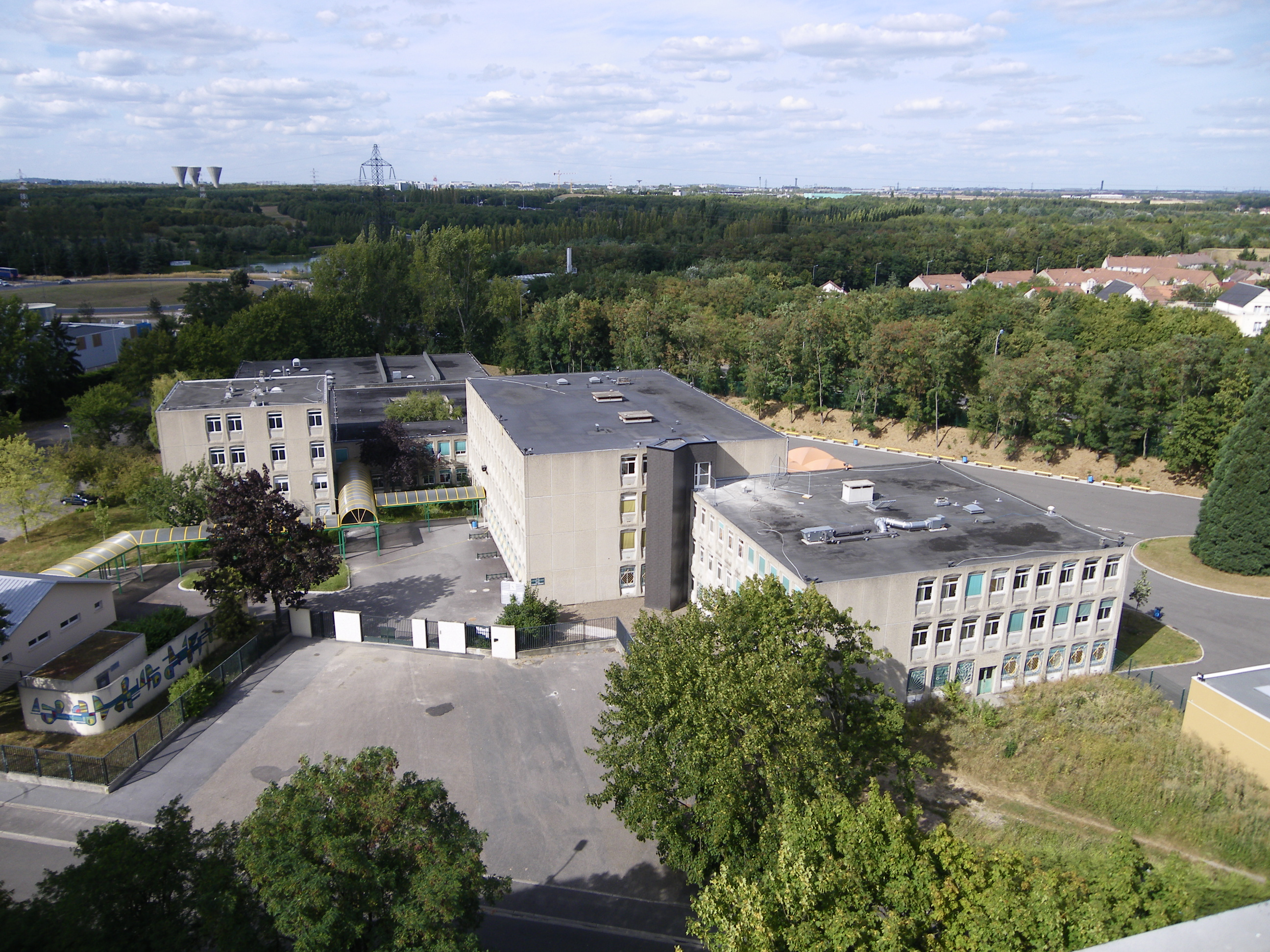
Claude Debussy College in August 2009

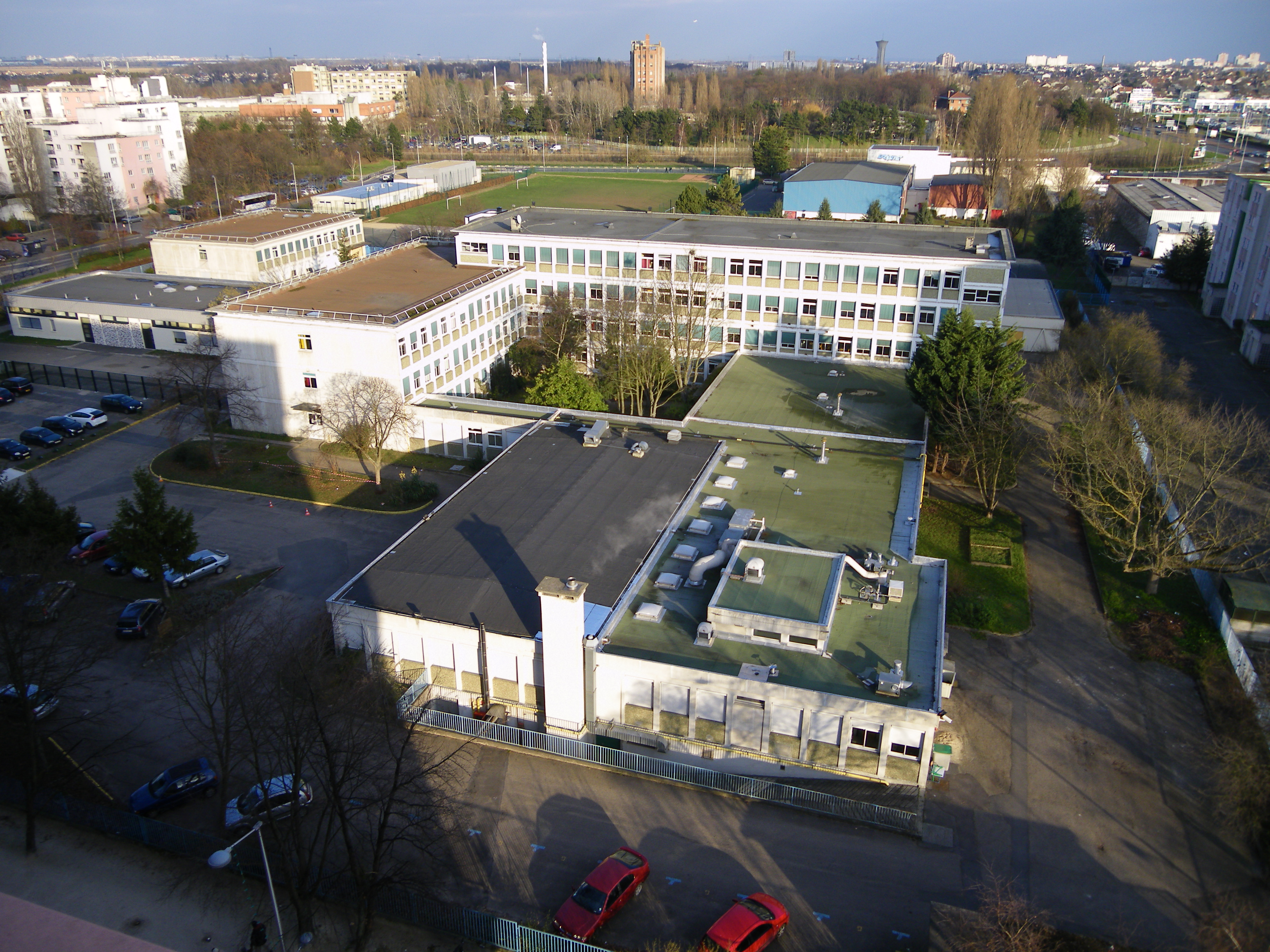
Pablo Néruda College in December 2009

Education of very young children:

- 6 full-time collective home crèches

Public schools:

- 23 public nursery schools/preschools
- 30 public primary schools
  - At the end of the 2007-2008 year the Bougainville elementary school was closed - Le parisien, edition 93 of 3 September 2007
- 7 public junior high schools
  - a project for a 7th school in the south is in progress
- 2 public secondary schools
  - Lycée polyvalent régional Voillaume
  - Lycée Jean Zay

Private schools:

- 1 private preschool elementary, junior and senior high school: Institution l’Espérance
- 1 private preschool, elementary school and senior high school: Protectorat Saint-Joseph

=== Health ===
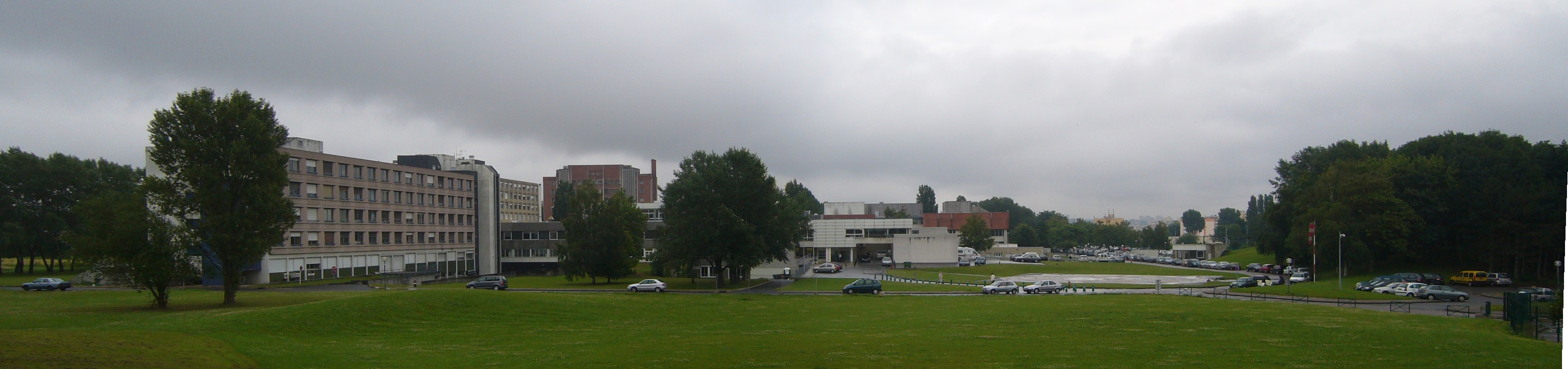
Robert Ballanger Hospital

There are three health facilities in Aulnay-sous-Bois:

- The Centre Hospitalier Robert Ballanger: the inter-communal hospital for Aulnay-sous-Bois, Villepinte, and Sevran (1750 employees).
- The 'René Muret-Bigottini Gerontology Hospital straddles the border between Sevran and Aulnay-sous-Bois.
- The 'Clinic of Aulnay, Private Hospital of east Paris

=== Sports ===
- "Coursailles" Olympic Swimming Stadium (up to 2700 people entering per day)

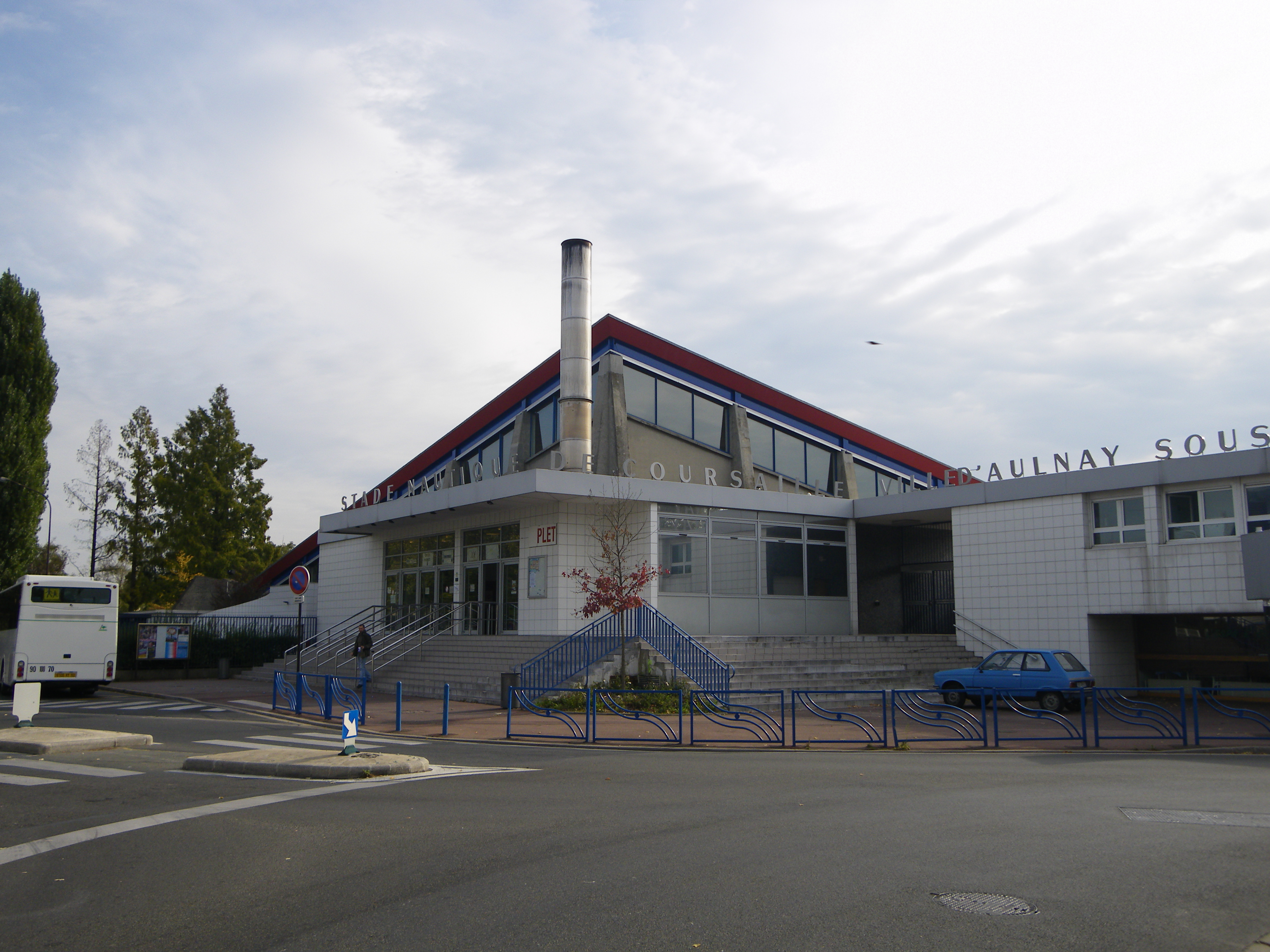
The entrance to the Coursailles pool in 2009

- 8 gymnasiums
- Stadiums:
  - Velodrome
  - 5 multi-purpose stadiums
  - 2 Sports Complexes
  - 3 tennis complexes

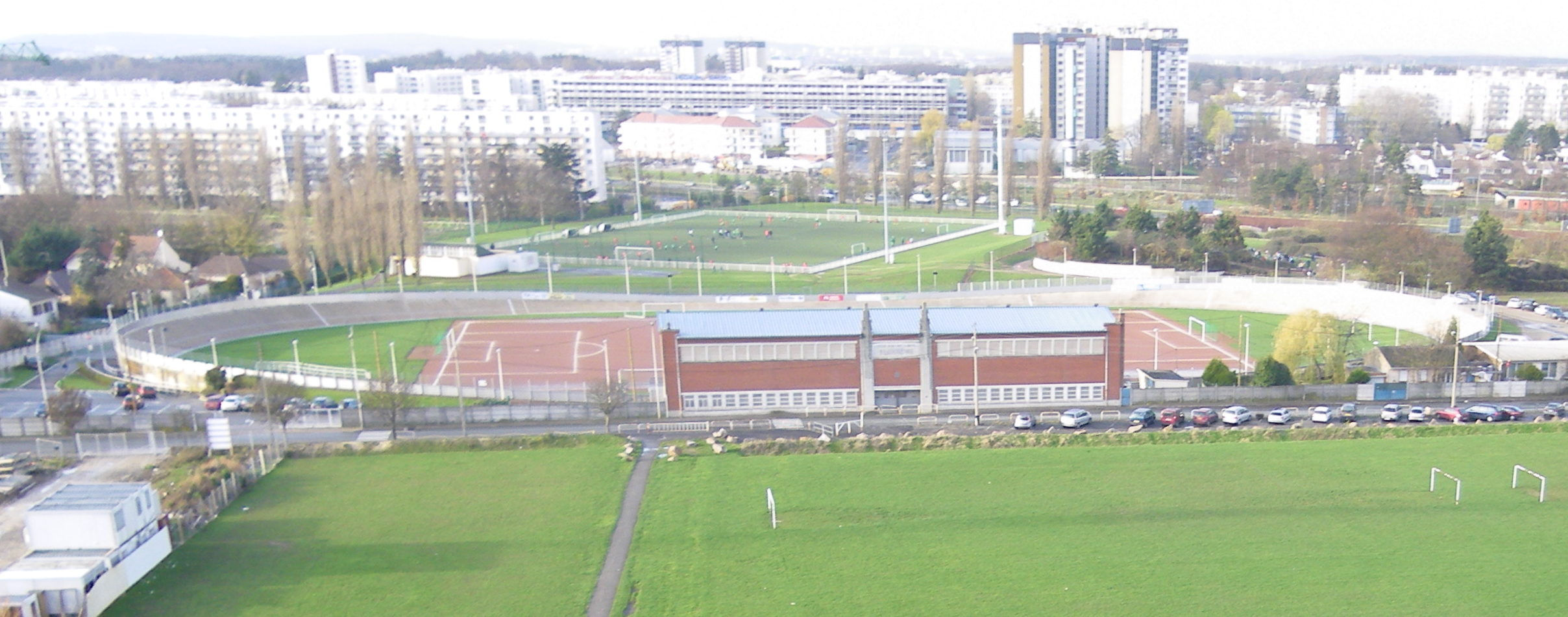
The Velodrome in 2009

=== Worship ===
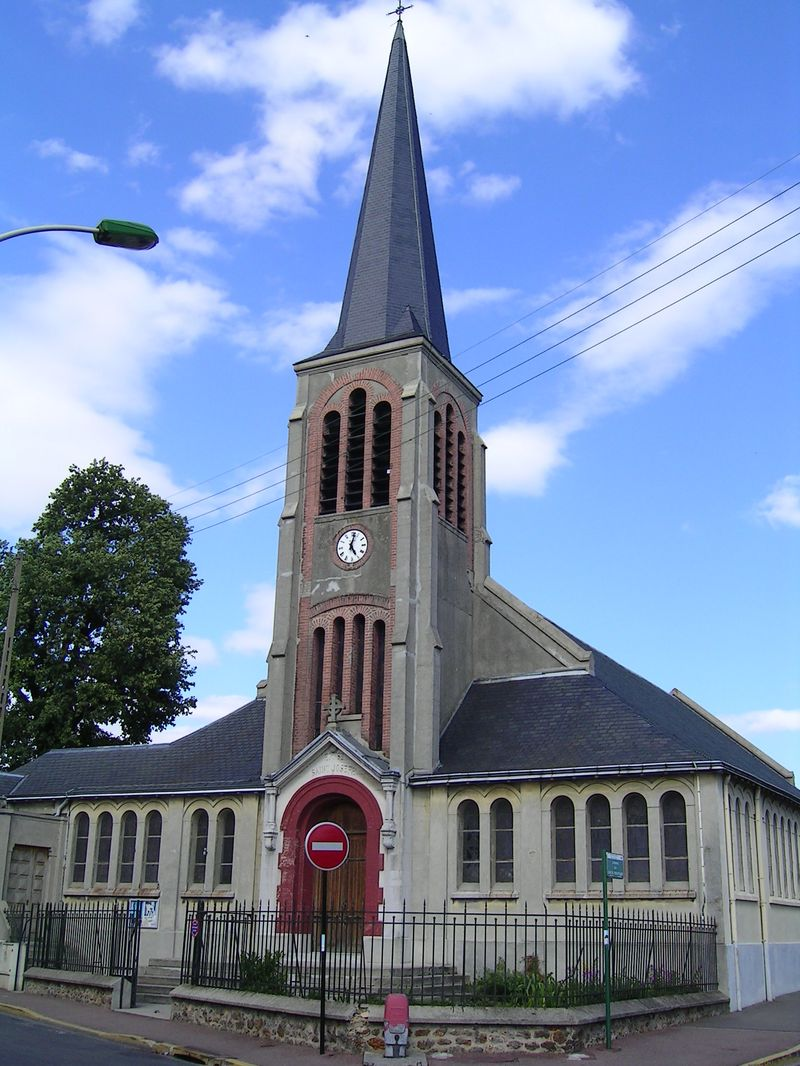
Church of Saint-Joseph

- Catholic worship:
  - Church of Saint-Sulpice, Rue de Sevran.
  - Church of Saint-Pierre de Nonneville, rue de Reims
  - Church of Saint-Paul of Ambourget, Rue du 8 Mai 1945
  - Church of Saint-Jean, gallerie Surcouf
  - Chapel of Notre-Dame du Coudray, Rue Francis Creno
  - Church of Saint-Joseph Church (including Christmas and every Sunday at 9:30 am it offers Mass in Polish), avenue de la Croix Blanche.
- Protestant worship: Temple of the Reformed Church of France, Boulevard Gourgues.
- Muslim worship:
  - Cultural Association of Muslims of Rose des Vents, rue Auguste Renoir
  - Cultural Association of Muslims of Aulnay, Rue de l'Esprit
  - Cultural Association of Muslims of Mitry, Allée des Cyprès
- Jewish worship:
  - Synagogue, Allée du Clermont-Tonnerre
  - Synagogue, Rue Dupuis

== Notable people ==
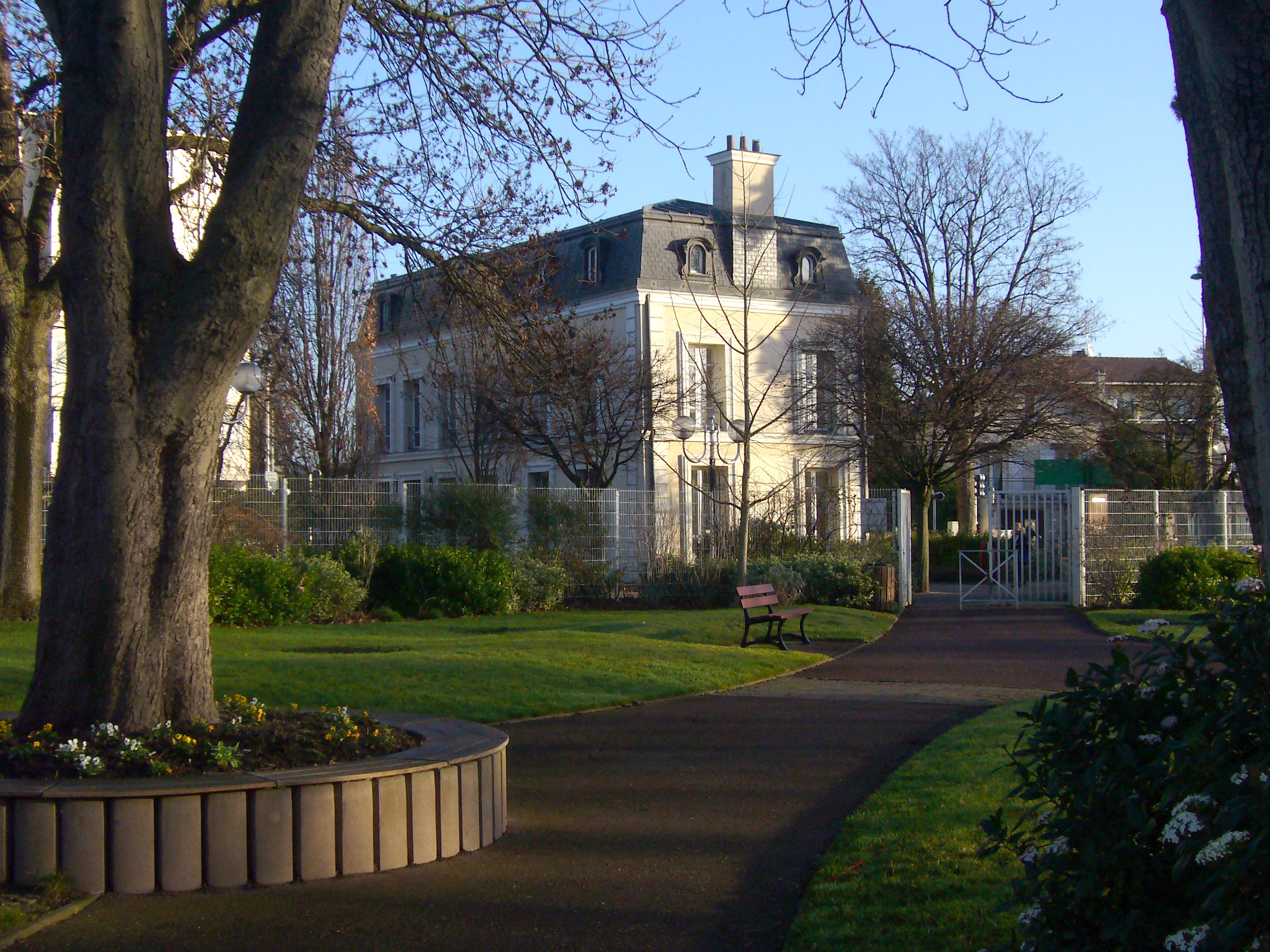
Gainville House, the oldest house in Aulnay, where Claude Louis Berthollet lived

- Amine, French-Moroccan R&B singer
- Robert Ballanger, French politician
- Claude Louis Berthollet, inventor
- Thomas Bouhail, Olympic silver medalist in Gymnastics Vaulting (2008)
- Olivier Dacourt, football player for Inter Milan
- Guy Decomble, actor, born on 12 November 1910
- Alou Diarra, footballer
- Boubakary Diarra, footballer at FC Torino (Italy)
- Nicolas Douchez, footballer at Paris Saint-Germain
- John Dovi, Light Heavyweight Boxing champion, National coach for the French Boxing Federation
- Boukary Dramé footballer at FC Sochaux
- Joachim Ekanga-Ehawa, basketballer at Paris-Levallois Basket
- Paul Éluard, French writer and poet
- Françoise Hardy, French actress, singer, autobiographer
- Alexandre Devoise, French radio presenter
- Jack Harris born Jacques Estevant (1940), composer, French novelist and poet
- Jean-Louis Mandengue, Light Heavyweight Boxing Champion of France
- Aya Nakamura, French-Malian RnB singer
- Sefyu, rapper
- Moussa Sissoko, footballer at Tottenham Hotspur and the France National Team
- Saïd Taghmaoui, film actor
- Teddy Tamgho, world champion and world record holder for the indoor triple jump (2010)
- Ali Traoré, basketballer at ASVEL Lyon-Villeurbanne
- Vald, French rapper

=== Bibliography ===
- Aulnay-sous-Bois, youth of an old country, Jacques Varin, 1982 (in French)
- Aulnay-Sous-Bois (History of) Jules Princet, 1936 (reprint 2004), ISBN 2843730546 (in French)

== See also ==
- Communes of the Seine-Saint-Denis department
