= Gourgue =

Gourgue may refer to:

== Places ==
- Gourgue, Hautes-Pyrénées, France

== People ==
- Amanda Gourgue (fl. 2016–2022), American politician in New Hampshire
- Gérard Gourgue (1925–2020), Haitian politician and human rights activist
- Jacques-Enguerrand Gourgue (1930–1996), Haitian painter

== See also ==
- Gourgues, a surname
