= Beschizza =

Beschizza is a surname. Notable people with the surname include:

- Bruno Beschizza (born 1968), French politician
- Rob Beschizza, American writer, artist and journalist
