= Hôtel de Ville, Aulnay-sous-Bois =

Town hall in Aulnay-sous-Bois, France

Hôtel de Ville
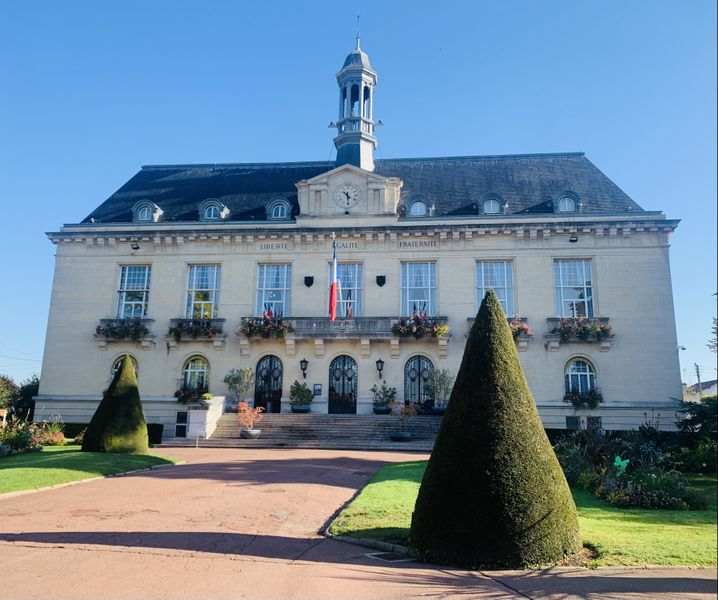
- The main frontage of the Hôtel de Ville in September 2022
- Interactive map of the Hôtel de Ville area

General information
- Type: City hall
- Architectural style: Neoclassical style
- Location: Aulnay-sous-Bois, France
- Coordinates: 48.9342°N 2.5001°E
- Completed: 1934

Design and construction
- Architect: Georges Levèque

The Hôtel de Ville (French pronunciation: [otɛl də vil], City Hall) is a municipal building in Aulnay-sous-Bois, Seine-Saint-Denis, in the northeast suburbs of Paris, France, standing on Boulevard de l'Hôtel de Ville.

== History ==
After the French Revolution, the town council initially met at the private houses of successive mayors. The first dedicated meeting place of the town council was close to the old clergy house for the Church of Saint-Sulpice and this was in use by 1815. The council then relocated to a building on Rue de Sevran in around 1908. However in the 1920s, the council decided to commission a more substantial town hall. The site they selected had been occupied by a large military barracks.

The foundation stone for the new building was laid on 13 March 1932. It was designed by Georges Levèque in the neoclassical style, built by Elie Lejeune in Saint-Maximin limestone and was officially opened by the future minister of finance, Pierre Cathala, in the presence of the mayor, Louis Poupon, on 1 July 1934.

The design involved a symmetrical main frontage of seven bays facing onto Boulevard de l'Hôtel de Ville. The central section of three bays featured a short flight of steps leading to three round headed openings with iron grills; there were three tall casement windows and a wide balcony on the first floor. The other bays were fenestrated by round headed windows on the ground floor and by tall casement windows with individual balconies on the first floor. At roof level, there was a modillioned cornice and, above the central bay, there was a clock flanked by pilasters supporting a triangular pediment. Behind the clock, there was an octagonal belfry. Internally, the principal rooms were the Salle du Conseil (council chamber), which featured white panelled walls, and the Salle des Mariages (wedding room), which featured a bust of Marianne on a pedestal.

A memorial stone, dedicated to the memory of Louis Barrault and Pierre Gastaud, was later installed in the garden in front of the town hall. These two members of the French Resistance, had been protecting an intelligence officer, Lieutenant René Veuve, who had been transmitting intelligence to allied forces. The two men were apprehended by German SS troops, tortured and shot on 18 August 1944, during the Second World War. This was just over a week before the liberation of the town by the French 2nd Armoured Division, commanded by General Philippe Leclerc, on 26 August 1944.
