= List of French communes named Saint-Germain =

In France, the following communes are named Saint-Germain, in whole or in part:

- Saint-Germain, in the Meurthe-et-Moselle département
- Saint-Germain, in the Ardèche département
- Saint-Germain, in the Aube département
- Saint-Germain, in the Haute-Saône département
- Saint-Germain, in the Vienne département
- Saint-Germain-au-Mont-d'Or, in the Rhône département
- Saint-Germain-Beaupré, in the Creuse département
- Saint-Germain-Chassenay, in the Nièvre département
- Saint-Germain-d'Anxure, in the Mayenne département
- Saint-Germain-d'Arcé, in the Sarthe département
- Saint-Germain-d'Aunay, in the Orne département
- Saint-Germain-de-Belvès, in the Dordogne département
- Saint-Germain-de-Calberte, in the Lozère département
- Saint-Germain-de-Clairefeuille, in the Orne département
- Saint-Germain-de-Confolens, in the Charente département
- Saint-Germain-de-Coulamer, in the Mayenne département
- Saint Germain d'Ectot, in the Calvados département
- Saint-Germain-de-Fresney, in the Eure département
- Saint-Germain-de-Grave, in the Gironde département
- Saint-Germain-de-Joux, in the Ain département
- Saint-Germain-de-la-Coudre, in the Orne département
- Saint-Germain-de-la-Grange, in the Yvelines département
- Saint-Germain-de-la-Rivière, in the Gironde département
- Saint Germain de Livet, in the Calvados département
- Saint-Germain-d'Elle, in the Manche département
- Saint-Germain-de-Longue-Chaume, in the Deux-Sèvres département
- Saint-Germain-de-Lusignan, in the Charente-Maritime département
- Saint-Germain-de-Marencennes, in the Charente-Maritime département
- Saint-Germain-de-Martigny, in the Orne département
- Saint-Germain-de-Modéon, in the Côte-d'Or département
- Saint-Germain-de-Montbron, in the Charente département
- Saint Germain de Montgommery, in the Calvados département
- Saint-Germain-de-Pasquier, in the Eure département
- Saint-Germain-de-Prinçay, in the Vendée département
- Saint-Germain-de-Salles, in the Allier département
- Saint-Germain-des-Angles, in the Eure département
- Saint-Germain-des-Bois, in the Cher département
- Saint-Germain-des-Bois, in the Nièvre département
- Saint-Germain-des-Champs, in the Yonne département
- Saint-Germain-des-Essourts, in the Seine-Maritime département
- Saint-Germain-des-Fossés, in the Allier département
- Saint-Germain-des-Grois, in the Orne département
- Saint-Germain-des-Prés, in the Dordogne département
- Saint-Germain-des-Prés, in the Loiret département
- Saint-Germain-des-Prés, in the Maine-et-Loire département
- Saint-Germain-des-Prés, in the Tarn département
- Saint-Germain-d'Esteuil, in the Gironde département
- Saint-Germain-des-Vaux, in the Manche département
- Saint-Germain-d'Étables, in the Seine-Maritime département
- Saint-Germain-de-Tallevende-la-Lande-Vaumont, in the Calvados département
- Saint-Germain-de-Tournebut, in the Manche département
- Saint-Germain-de-Varreville, in the Manche département
- Saint-Germain-de-Vibrac, in the Charente-Maritime département
- Saint-Germain-du-Bel-Air, in the Lot département
- Saint-Germain-du-Bois, in the Saône-et-Loire département
- Saint-Germain-du-Corbéis, in the Orne département
- Saint Germain du Crioult, in the Calvados département
- Saint Germain du Pert, in the Calvados département
- Saint-Germain-du-Pinel, in the Ille-et-Vilaine département
- Saint-Germain-du-Plain, in the Saône-et-Loire département
- Saint-Germain-du-Puch, in the Gironde département
- Saint-Germain-du-Puy, in the Cher département
- Saint-Germain-du-Salembre, in the Dordogne département
- Saint-Germain-du-Seudre, in the Charente-Maritime département
- Saint-Germain-du-Teil, in the Lozère département
- Saint-Germain-en-Brionnais, in the Saône-et-Loire département
- Saint-Germain-en-Coglès, in the Ille-et-Vilaine département
- Saint-Germain-en-Laye, in the Yvelines département
- Saint-Germain-en-Montagne, in the Jura département
- Saint-Germain-et-Mons, in the Dordogne département
- Saint Germain la Blanche Herbe, in the Calvados département
- Saint-Germain-la-Campagne, in the Eure département
- Saint-Germain-la-Chambotte, in the Savoie département
- Saint-Germain-l'Aiguiller, in the Vendée département
- Saint-Germain-la-Montagne, in the Loire département
- Saint-Germain-Langot, in the Calvados département
- Saint-Germain-la-Poterie, in the Oise département
- Saint-Germain-Laprade, in the Haute-Loire département
- Saint-Germain-Laval, in the Loire département
- Saint-Germain-Laval, in the Seine-et-Marne département
- Saint-Germain-la-Ville, in the Marne département
- Saint-Germain-Lavolps, in the Corrèze département
- Saint-Germain-Laxis, in the Seine-et-Marne département
- Saint-Germain-le-Châtelet, in the Territoire de Belfort département
- Saint-Germain-le-Fouilloux, in the Mayenne département
- Saint-Germain-le-Gaillard, in the Eure-et-Loir département
- Saint-Germain-le-Gaillard, in the Manche département
- Saint-Germain-le-Guillaume, in the Mayenne département
- Saint-Germain-Lembron, in the Puy-de-Dôme département
- Saint-Germain-le-Rocheux, in the Côte-d'Or département
- Saint-Germain-lès-Arlay, in the Jura département
- Saint-Germain-lès-Arpajon, in the Essonne département
- Saint-Germain-les-Belles, in the Haute-Vienne département
- Saint-Germain-sous-Doue, in the Seine-et-Marne département
- Saint-Germain-sur-École, in the Seine-et-Marne département
- Saint-Germain-sur-Morin, in the Seine-et-Marne département
