= Lycée Voillaume =

Information
- Type: Public high school

Lycée Voillaume is a senior high school/sixth-form college in Aulnay-sous-Bois, Seine-Saint-Denis, France, in the Paris metropolitan area. It was built in 1965.
