= Saint-Germain-de-Longue-Chaume =

- Commune
- Location of Saint-Germain-de-Longue-Chaume
- Location within France Location within Nouvelle-Aquitaine
- Coordinates: 46°43′04″N 0°20′56″W
- Country: France
- Region: Nouvelle-Aquitaine
- Department: Deux-Sèvres
- Arrondissement: Parthenay
- Canton: Parthenay
- Intercommunality: CC Parthenay-Gâtine

Government
  - Mayor (2020–2026): Bernard Mimeau
- Area^{1}: 15 km^{2} (5.8 sq mi)
- Highest elevation: 232 m (761 ft)
- Lowest elevation: 163 m (535 ft)
- Population (2023): 380
  - Density: 25/km^{2} (66/sq mi)
- Time zone: UTC+01:00 (CET)
  - Summer (DST): UTC+02:00 (CEST)
- INSEE/Postal code: 79255 /
- ^{1} French Land Register data, which excludes lakes, ponds, glaciers > 1 km^{2} (0.386 sq mi or 247 acres) and river estuaries.

Saint-Germain-de-Longue-Chaume (French pronunciation: [sɛ̃ ʒɛʁmɛ̃ də lɔ̃ɡ ʃom]) is a commune in the Deux-Sèvres department in western France.

== See also ==
- Communes of the Deux-Sèvres department
