= Bruno Beschizza =

French politician (born 1968)

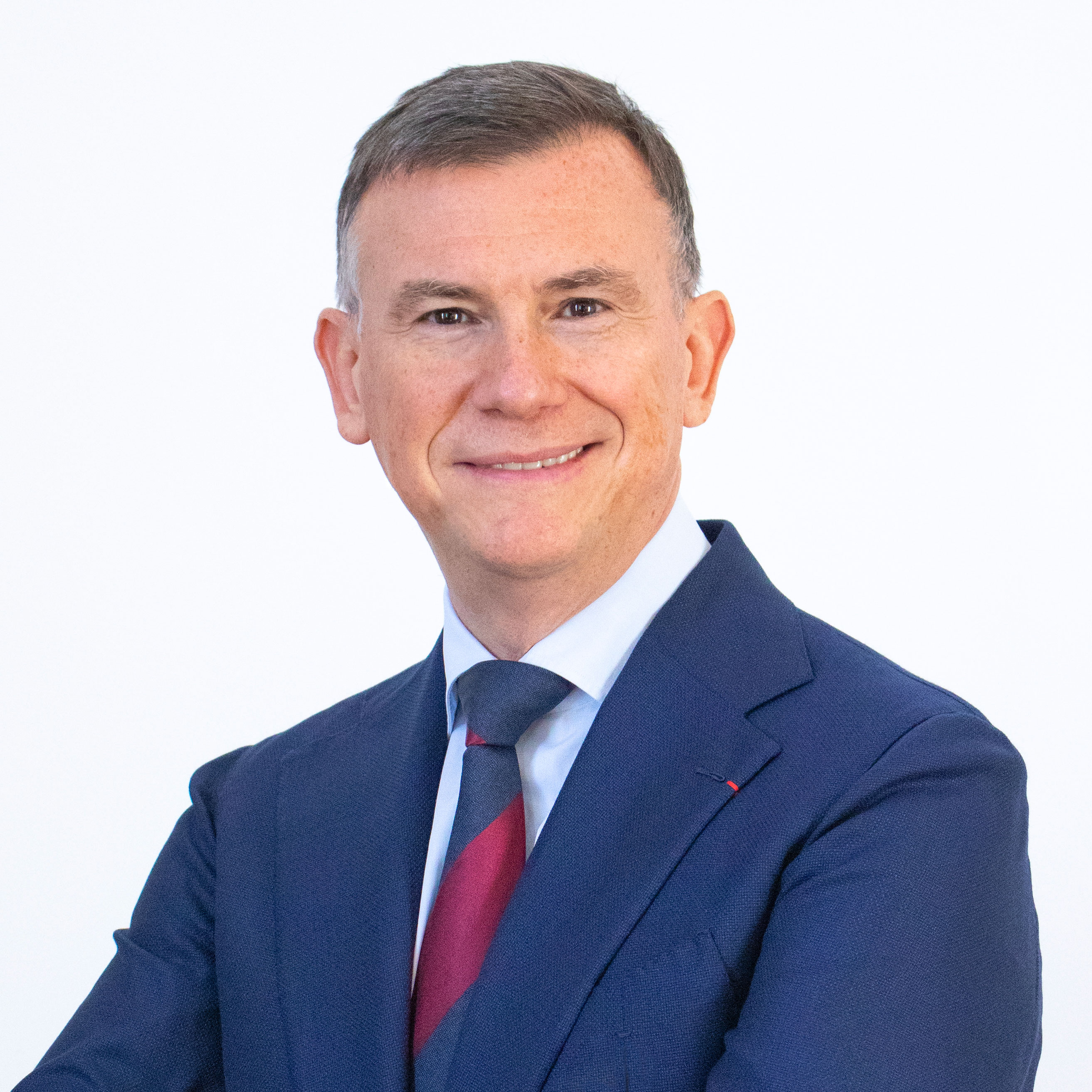
- Beschizza in 2023

Mayor of Aulnay-sous-Bois
- Incumbent
- Assumed office 5 April 2014
- Preceded by: Gérard Ségura

Personal details
- Born: 24 March 1968 (age 58)
- Party: The Republicans (since 2015); Union for a Popular Movement (until 2015)

Bruno Beschizza (born 24 March 1968) is a French retired police officer, trade unionist, and politician of The Republicans. Since 2014, he has served as mayor of Aulnay-sous-Bois. He has been a member of the Regional Council of Île-de-France since 2010, and was a candidate for Seine-Saint-Denis's 3rd constituency in the 2012 legislative election. From 1998 to 2010, he served as secretary general of the police union Synergie-Officiers.
