= Gourgues =

Gourgues or de Gourgues is a surname. Notable people with the name include:

- Dominique de Gourgues (1530–1593), French nobleman and soldier
- Kalvin Gourgues (born 2005), French rugby player

== See also ==
- Gourgue (disambiguation)
