= Jacques Coitier =

Jacques Coitier (c. 1430 – 22 October 1506) was a French doctor. He was chief physician to King Louis XI and president of the Chambre des comptes.

Coitier was born at Poligny, Franche-Comté. His name is spelled in several ways, most often Coictier (the spelling used by Victor Hugo in his novel The Hunchback of Notre-Dame), but also Coittier, Cotier, Coytier or Coctier. An analysis of his signatures by Achille Chereau has allowed Coitier to become the standard spelling — this was the name cited most often in medical annals. He died in Paris.

== Bibliography ==
- (in French) Mémoires de Philippe de Commines in Mémoires pour servir à l'histoire de France, Michaud et Poujalat, Paris, 1837
- (in French) Nouvelle Biographie Générale, t11, Firmin Didot, 1855, pp. 86–89
- (in French) Masson et Asselin, Dictionnaire Encyclopédique des Sciences Médicales, t. 18, 1876, pp. 717–718
- (in French) Bulletin de la Société française d'histoire de la médecine, n°11, 1912, pp. 315–322
- (in French) Émile Aron, Louis XI et ses guérisseurs, CLD, 1983
- (in French) Victor Advielle, Discussion historique sur le véritable lieu de naissance de Jacques Coitier, médecin du roi Louis XI, H. Damelet, 1865
- (in French) Achille Chéreau, Jacques Coitier, médecin de Louis XI, roi de France, Mareschal, 1861
