= Louis II of Blois =

Louis II of Châtillon
- Count of Blois
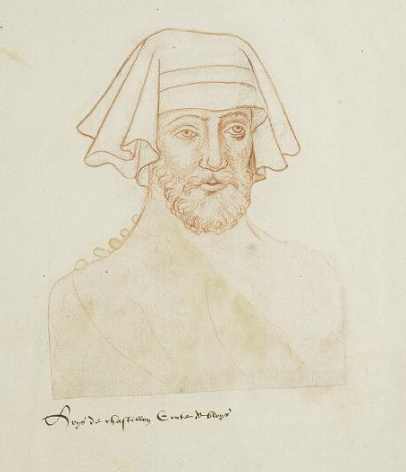
- Louis II of Châtillon, count of Blois, recueil d'Arras

Count of Blois and Dunois
- Reign: 1342 – 26 August 1346
- Predecessor: Guy I
- Successor: Louis III

Count of Soissons
- Reign: 1344 – 26 August 1346
- Predecessor: Jeanne
- Successor: William I of Namur
- Died: 26 August 1346; Battle of Crécy, Crécy-en-Ponthieu, Kingdom of France
- Spouse: Jeanne of Hainault
- Issue: Louis III, Count of Blois; John II, Count of Blois; Guy II, Count of Blois
- House: House of Châtillon
- Father: Guy I, Count of Blois
- Mother: Margaret of Valois, Countess of Blois

Louis II of Châtillon (died 26 August 1346), also known as Louis I of Blois-Châtillon, was count of Blois, count of Dunois, and jure uxoris count of Soissons from 1342 until his death at the Battle of Crécy.

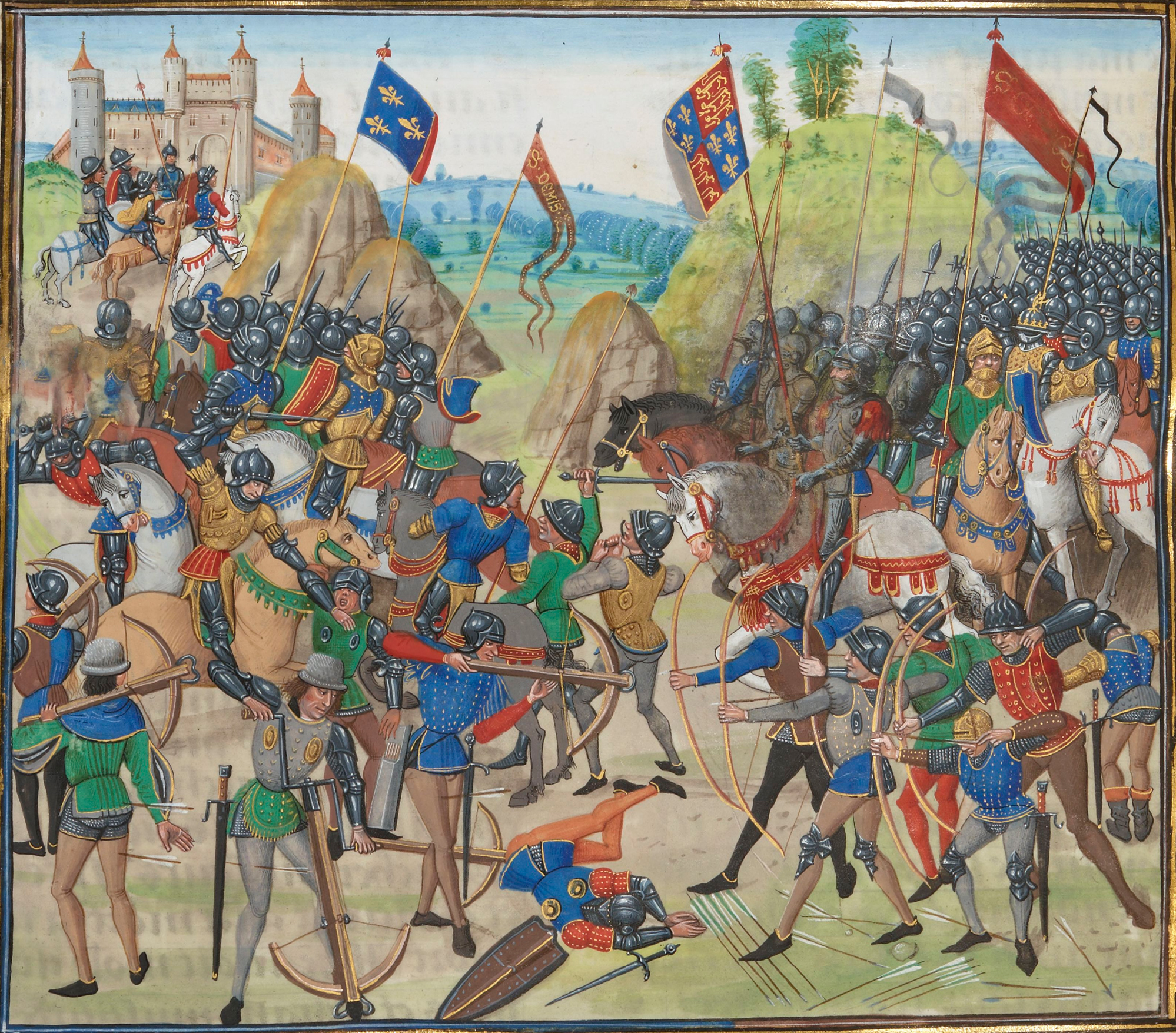
The battle of Crécy, from an illuminated manuscript of Jean Froissart's Chronicles.

== Background and family ==
Louis was the eldest son of Guy I, Count of Blois and Margaret of Valois, the sister of King Philip VI of France. Born into the House of Châtillon, Louis was part of a prestigious military family with strong connections to the royal House of Valois and with great possessions in northeastern France centred around the county of Blois. His younger brother, Charles of Blois, was wed in 1337 to Joan of Penthièvre, the daughter and heiress of John III, Duke of Brittany, and invested as the duke's own successor.

In 1340 in Soissons, he married Jeanne of Avesnes, Countess of Soissons (d. 1350), daughter of John of Avesnes, Lord of Beaumont. They had three children:

- Louis III, Count of Blois and Soissons
- John II, Count of Blois
- Guy II, Count of Blois and Soissons

== War with England ==
When the Duke of Brittany died in April 1341, Charles of Blois' claim on the duchy was contested by the old duke's half-brother John of Montfort, leading to the outbreak of the War of the Breton Succession. With the backing of their uncle Philip VI, Louis of Blois supported his brother's claim and served as one of his chief lieutenants, alongside Charles of Spain. On 15 April 1342, Louis joined his brother on a successful attack on Rennes, easily capturing the Montforts' easternmost stronghold.

Louis was killed at the battle of Crécy.

== Sources ==
- Livingston, Michael (2022). Crécy: Battle of Five Kings. United Kingdom: Osprey Publishing. ISBN 978-1472847058.
- Thiry-Stassin, Martine (2008). "Jean de Hainaut, comte de Beaumont et de Chimay, entre Jean de Bel et Jean Froissart". In Moreno, Paolo; Palumbo, Giovanni (eds.). Autour du XVe siècle: journées d'étude en l'honneur d'Alberto Varvaro (in French). Librairie Droz S.A.
- de Venette, Jean (1953). Newhall, Richard A. (ed.). The Chronicle of Jean de Venette. Translated by Birdsall, Jean. Columbia University Press.
- Sumption, Jonathan (1990). The Hundred Years War 1: Trial by Battle. London: Faber & Faber. ISBN 978-0-571-13895-1.

French nobility
Preceded by Guy I	Count of Blois; 1342–1346	Succeeded by Louis III
Preceded by Jeanne	Count of Soissons; 1344–1346; With: Jeanne	Succeeded by Louis III
