= Guy II of Blois =

French noble (d. 1397)

Guy II of Châtillon
- Count of Blois
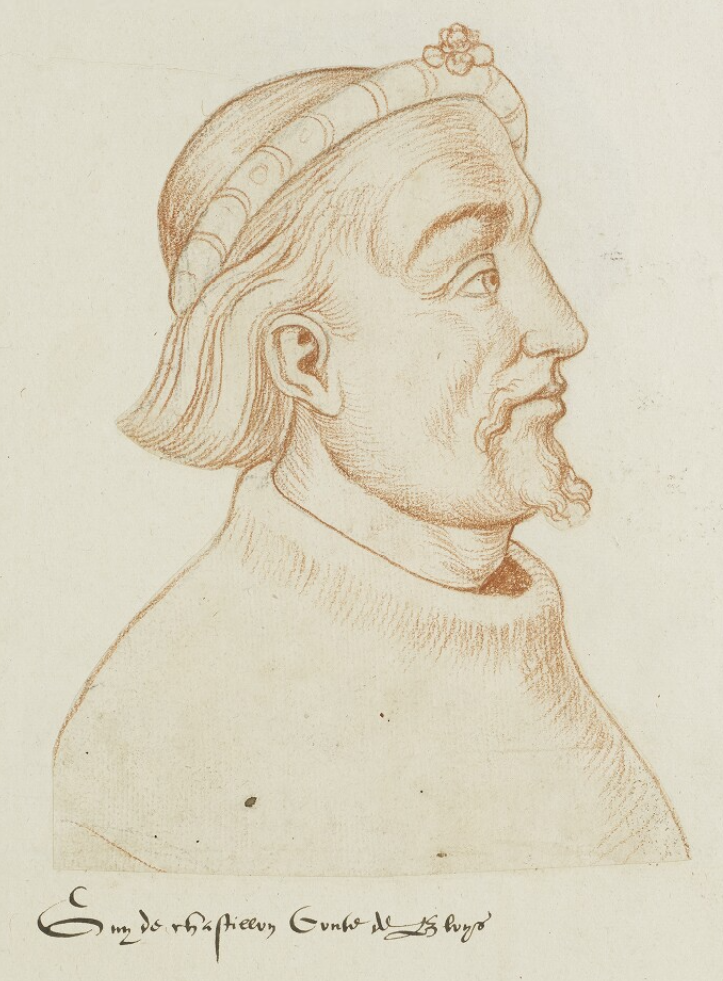
- Guy II of Châtillon, from the Recueil d'Arras

Count of Blois and Dunois
- Reign: 1381 – 22 December 1397
- Predecessor: John II
- Successor: Louis of Orléans
- Died: 22 December 1397
- Spouse: Marie of Namur
- Issue: Louis III of Châtillon
- House: House of Châtillon
- Father: Louis II, Count of Blois
- Mother: Jeanne of Hainault

Guy II of Châtillon, Count of Blois (died 22 December 1397), the youngest son of Louis I of Châtillon and Joan of Avesnes, was Count of Blois and Soissons, and lord of Avesnes, Schoonhoven, and Gouda 1381–1397, and lord of Beaumont and Chimay.

In 1360, he was one of the hostages sent to the Kingdom of England by the terms of the Treaty of Brétigny. He was eventually ransomed by the sale of Soissons and was released on 15 August 1367. He was knighted in 1370 while crusading with the Teutonic Knights in Lithuania. In 1374 he married Marie, daughter of William I, Marquis of Namur, and they had one son:

- Louis III of Châtillon (d. 1391)

Thereafter he joined in the wars of king Charles VI, and commanded the rearguard at the Battle of Roosebeke. The death of his only son in 1391 prompted him to sell the inheritance of the County of Blois to Louis of Valois, Duke of Orléans.

He was for some time the patron of Jean Froissart: he appointed him his chaplain in 1384 and obtained for him the benefice of Lestines-au-Mont and the canonicate of Chimay. His patronage allowed Froissart to write Book II of his chronicles.

French nobility
Preceded by John II	Count of Blois and Dunois; 1381–1397	Succeeded by Louis of Orléans
