= Louis III of Blois =

Louis III of Châtillon
- Count of Blois

Count of Blois and Dunois
- Reign: 26 August 1346 – 1372
- Predecessor: Louis II
- Successor: John II

Count of Soissons
- Reign: 1346 – 1367
- Predecessor: Jeanne of Hainault
- Successor: Enguerrand VII de Coucy
- Died: 1372
- House: House of Châtillon
- Father: Louis II, Count of Blois
- Mother: Jeanne of Hainault

Louis III of Châtillon (died 1372), also known as Louis II of Blois-Châtillon, was count of Blois and Dunois from 1346 until his death. He also held the title count of Soissons until the county was ceded in connection with the ransom of his brother Guy II, who had been sent to England as a hostage after the Treaty of Brétigny.

Louis succeeded his father after the latter was killed at the Battle of Crécy in 1346. He held Blois and Dunois during the minority of the Châtillon-Blois brothers, whose mother was Jeanne of Hainault, countess of Soissons.

After the Treaty of Brétigny, Louis's younger brother Guy was sent to England as a hostage. A nineteenth-century collection of documents relating to the hostages of King John II of France states that Guy became hostage for his elder brother Count Louis de Blois and remained in England for more than six years. His release was ultimately connected with the renunciation of Châtillon-Blois rights in the county of Soissons, which was transferred to Enguerrand VII de Coucy in 1367.

Louis died in 1372 and was succeeded in Blois by his brother John II.

Preceded by Louis II	Count of Blois; 1346–1372	Succeeded by John II
Preceded by Louis II	Count of Soissons; 1346–1367	Succeeded by Enguerrand
