= John II of Blois =

Franco-Dutch nobleman (died 1381)

John II of Châtillon
- Count of Blois
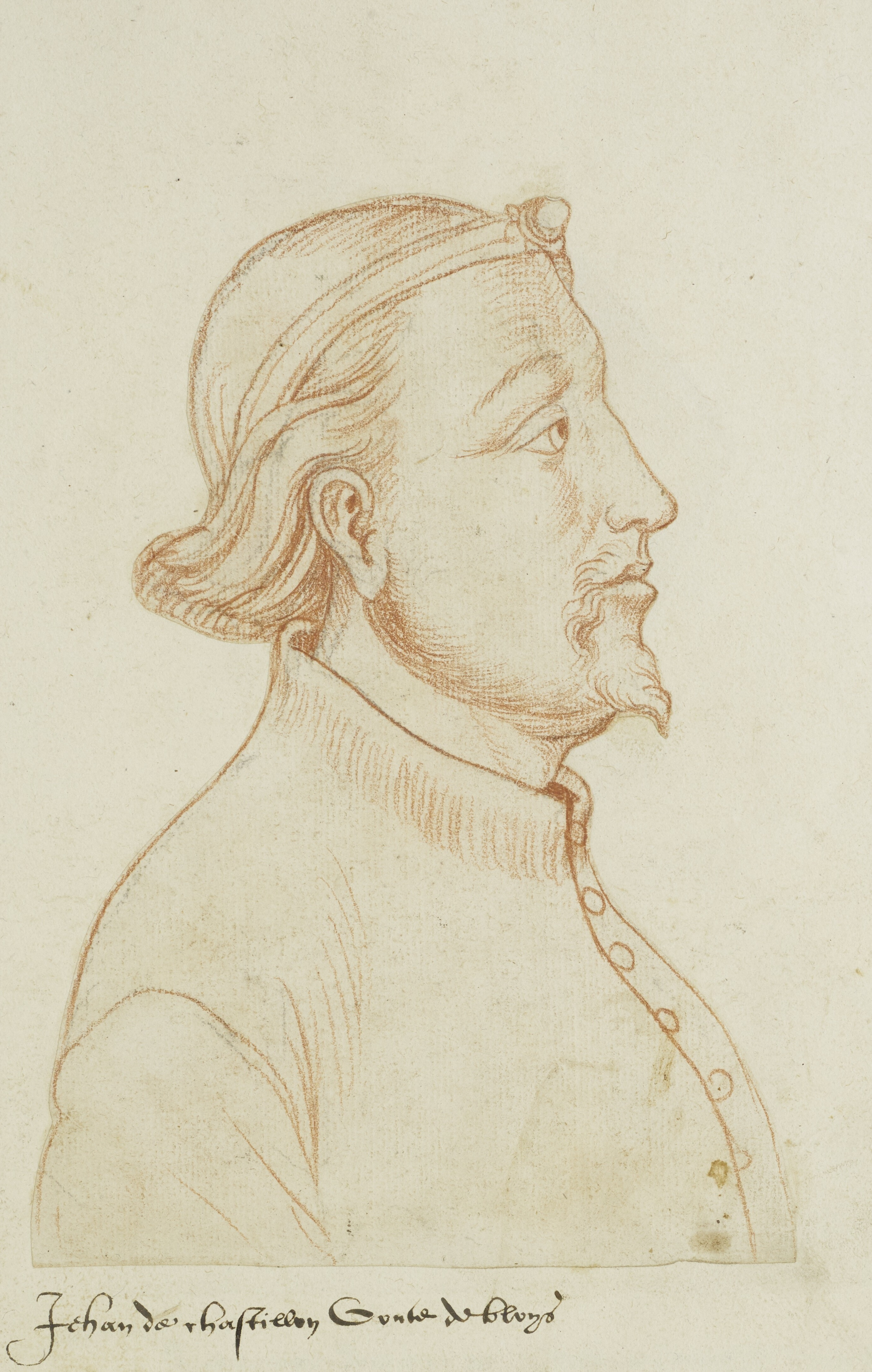
- John II of Blois, Recueil d'Arras.

Count of Blois and Dunois
- Reign: 1372 – 19 May 1381
- Predecessor: Louis III
- Successor: Guy II
- Born: c. 1342
- Died: 19 May 1381; Valenciennes
- Spouse: Matilda of Guelders
- Issue: John, Lord of Trélon (ill.); Guy, Lord of Heften (ill.)
- House: House of Châtillon
- Father: Louis II, Count of Blois
- Mother: Jeanne of Hainault

John II of Châtillon (c. 1342 – 19 May 1381) was a French nobleman of the House of Châtillon who held lands in France and the Low Countries. He was count of Blois and Dunois from 1372 until his death, lord of Avesnes, Schoonhoven, Gouda, Beaumont, Chimay and Waarde, and served as stadtholder of Holland and Zeeland during absences of Count Albert of Bavaria. Through his marriage to Matilda of Guelders, he was also a claimant jure uxoris to the Duchy of Guelders from 1372 until 1379.

John was the second son of Count Louis II of Blois and Jeanne of Hainault, daughter of John of Beaumont. His father died at the battle of Crécy in 1346 and his mother administered his inheritance. In 1356, his maternal grandfather died, leaving him many lordships scattered throughout the Low Countries.

John made his chief residence at Schoonhoven, where he patronized French and Dutch poets. His court was the literary centre of Holland before the arrival of Albert of Bavaria. John was on good terms with Albert and represented him during his absence from Holland. In 1362 and 1363, when John went on crusade in Prussia, he took with him his professional storyteller, Augustijnken.

On 14 February 1372, John married Matilda, daughter of Duke Reginald II of Guelders. He was proclaimed duke of Guelders by the faction of Heeckerens, supported by the bishop of Utrecht, Arnold of Horne. That same year, he succeeded his elder brother, Louis III, in the counties of Blois and Dunois.

In 1371, Matilda's brothers, Dukes Reginald III and Edward, had died. John spent most of the rest of his life trying to seize Guelders from Matilda's nephew, William VII of Jülich, in the First War of the Guelderian Succession. William had the support of the Emperor Charles IV. In 1377, John was forced to abandon Arnhem, where he had set up his court. In 1379, he renounced his claim on Guelders in exchange for an annual pension from William.

John died at Valenciennes. He had no children with his wife. He had two sons by a mistress, Isabeau d'Isbergues: John, who became lord of Trélon, and Guy, lord of Heften in Zeeland.

== Bibliography ==
- Bouwmeester, Gerard (2014). "Interplay between Text and Text Collection: The Case of Augustijnken's Dryvoldicheit". Journal of the Early Book Society. 17: 242–253. ProQuest 1674357474
- van Oostrom, Frits Pieter (1992). Court and Culture: Dutch Literature, 1350–1450. Translated by Arnold J. Pomerans. University of California Press.
- Warnar, Geert (2005). "Augustijnken in Pruisen: Over de Drijfveren van Een Middelnederlandse Dichter en Literatuur binnen de Duitse Orde". Jaarboek voor Middeleeuwse Geschiedenis. 8: 101–139.

French nobility
Preceded by Louis III	Count of Blois and Dunois; 1372–1381	Succeeded by Guy II
