= Middle Dutch literature =

Medieval Dutch literature

Middle Dutch literature (1150–1500) is the Dutch literature produced in the Low Countries from the 12th century to the 16th century and written in Middle Dutch. It is preceded by only a few fragmentary texts existing in Old Dutch, and it was succeeded by Dutch Renaissance and Golden Age literature.

== Early stages ==
In the first stages of Dutch literature, poetry was the predominant form of literary expression. In the Low Countries as in the rest of Europe, courtly romance and poetry were popular genres during the Middle Ages. The chivalric epic was a popular genre as well, often featuring King Arthur or Charlemagne (Karel) as protagonist (with notable example of Karel ende Elegast, Dutch for "Charlemagne and the elf-spirit/elf-guest").

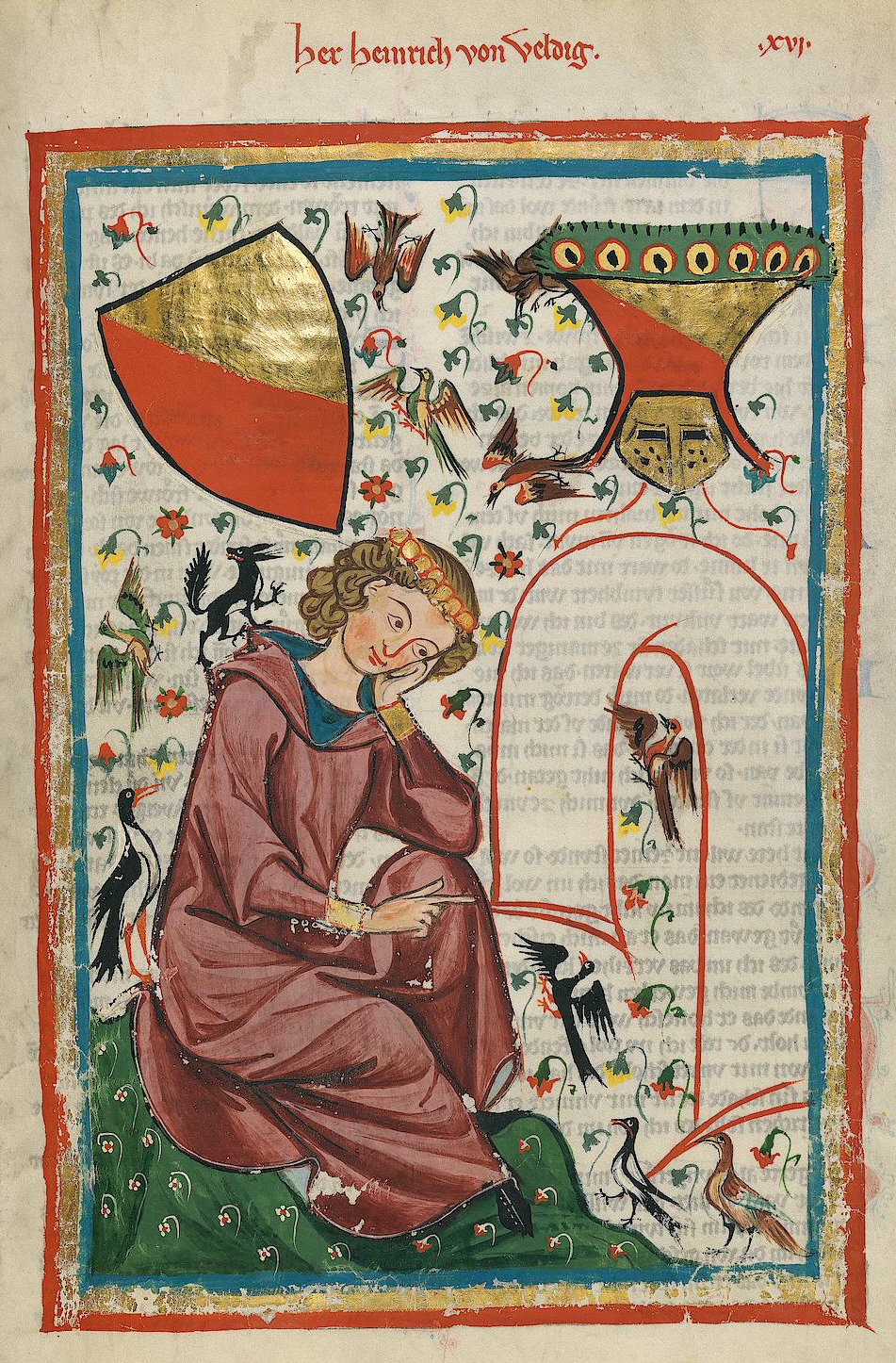
Henric van Veldeke.

The first Dutch language writer known by name is the 12th-century County of Loon poet Henric van Veldeke, an early contemporary of Walther von der Vogelweide. Van Veldeke wrote courtly love poetry, a hagiography of Saint Servatius and an epic retelling of the Aeneid in a Limburgish dialect that straddles the Dutch-German language boundary.

A number of the surviving epic works, especially the courtly romances, were copies from or expansions of earlier German or French efforts, but there are examples of truly original works (such as the anonymously written Karel ende Elegast) and original Dutch-language works that were translated into other languages (notable Dutch morality play Elckerlijc formed the basis for the English play Everyman).

Apart from ancient tales embedded in Dutch folk songs, virtually no genuine folk-tales of Dutch antiquity have come down to us, and scarcely any echoes of Germanic myth. On the other hand, the sagas of Charlemagne and Arthur appear immediately in Middle Dutch forms. These were evidently introduced by wandering minstrels and translated to gratify the curiosity of the noble women. It is rarely that the name of such a translator has reached us. The Chanson de Roland was translated somewhere in the twelfth century, and the Flemish minstrel Diederic van Assenede completed his version of Floris and Blancheflour as Floris ende Blancefloer around 1260.

The Arthurian legends appear to have been brought to Flanders by some Flemish colonists in Wales, on their return to their mother country. Around 1250 a Brabantine minstrel translated the Prose Lancelot at the command of his liege, Lodewijk van Velthem. This adaptation, known as the Lancelot Compilation, contains many differences from the French original, and includes a number of episodes that were probably originally separate romances. Some of these are themselves translations of French originals, but others, such as the Moriaen, seem to be originals. The Gauvain was translated by Penninc and Vostaert as Roman van Walewein before 1260, while the first wholly original Dutch epic writer, Jacob van Maerlant, occupied himself around 1260 with several romances dealing with Merlin and the Holy Grail.

The earliest existing fragments of the epic of Reynard the Fox were written in Latin by Flemish priests, and about 1250 the first part of a very important version in Dutch, Vanden vos Reynaerde ("Of Reynard") was made by Willem. In his existing work the author follows Pierre de Saint-Cloud, but not slavishly; and he is the first really admirable writer that we meet with in Dutch literature.

The first lyrical writer of the Low Countries was John I, Duke of Brabant, who practised the minnelied with success. In 1544 the earliest collection of Dutch folk-songs saw the light, and in this volume one or two romances of the fourteenth century are preserved, of which "Het Daghet in den Oosten" is the best known. Almost the earliest fragment of Dutch popular poetry, but of later time, is an historical ballad describing the murder of Floris V, Count of Holland in 1296. A very curious collection of mystical lyrics and songs by Hadewijch, a Brabantine Beguine, was first printed in 1875.

Up until now, the Middle Dutch language output mainly serviced the aristocratic and monastic orders, recording the traditions of chivalry and of religion, but scarcely addressed the bulk of the population. With the close of the thirteenth century a change came over the face of Dutch literature. The Dutch towns began to prosper and to assert their commercial supremacy over the North Sea. Under such mild rulers as William II and Floris V, Dordrecht, Amsterdam and other cities won privileges amounting almost to political independence, and with this liberty there arose a new sort of literary expression.

== Influential writers ==
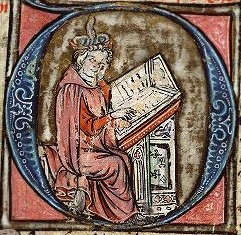
Jacob van Maerlant.

The founder and creator of this original Dutch literature was Jacob van Maerlant. His Der naturen bloeme ("The Flower of Nature"), written about 1270, takes an important place in early Dutch literature. It is a collection of moral and satirical addresses to all classes of society. With his Rijmbijbel ("Verse Bible") he foreshadowed the courage and free-thought of the Reformation. It was not until 1284 that he began his masterpiece, De Spieghel Historiael ("The Mirror of History") at the command of Count Floris V.

In the northern provinces, an equally great talent was exhibited by Melis Stoke, a monk of Egmond, who wrote the history of the state of Holland to the year 1305; his work, the Rijmkroniek ("Verse Chronicle"), was printed in 1591 and for its exactitude and minute detail it has proved of inestimable service to later historians.

John II of Blois was a major patron of literature in Middle Dutch in the 1360s. Augustijnken was among those in his service.

== Chivalric era ==
With the middle of the fourteenth century the chivalric spirit came once more into fashion. A certain revival of the forms of feudal life made its appearance under William III and his successors. Knightly romances came once more into vogue, but the newborn didactic poetry contended vigorously against the supremacy of what was lyrical and epical.

From the very first the literary spirit in the Low Countries began to assert itself in a homely and utilitarian spirit. Thoroughly aristocratic in feeling was Hem van Aken, a priest of Louvain, who lived about 1255–1330, and who combined to a very curious extent the romantic and didactic elements prevailing at the time. As early as 1280 he had completed his translation of the Roman de la Rose, which he must have commenced in the lifetime of its author Jean de Meung.

During the Bavarian period (1349–1433), very little original writing of much value was produced in Holland. Towards the end of the 14th century, an erotic poet of considerable power arose in the person of the lord of Waddinxveen, Dirc Potter van der Loo (c. 1365–1428), who was secretary at the court of the counts of Holland. During an embassy in Rome, this eminent diplomat made himself acquainted with the writings of Giovanni Boccaccio and commenced a vast poem, Der Minnen Loep ("The Course of Love"), a mixture of classical and Biblical instances of amorous adventures set in a framework of didactic philosophy. In Potter, the last traces of the chivalric element died out of Dutch literature, and poetry was left entirely in the hands of the school of Maerlant.

== Drama ==
As in most European nations, the religious drama takes a prominent place in a survey of medieval literature in the Low Countries. The earliest existing fragment is part of a Maastricht Passover Play of about 1360. There is also a Holy Sacrament, composed by a certain Smeken at Breda and performed in 1500. In addition to these purely theological dramas there were acted mundane plays and farces, performed outside the churches by semi-religious companies; these curious moralities were known as Abele Spelen ("Worthy Plays") and Sotternien ("Silly Plays"). In these pieces we discover the first traces of that genius for low comedy which was afterwards further developed in the dramas of Bredero and the paintings of Teniers.

== Prose ==
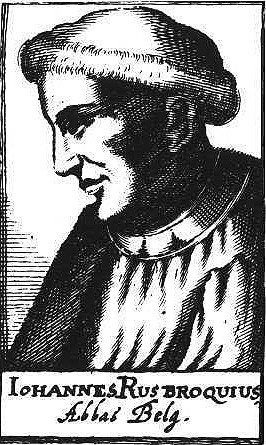
Jan van Ruusbroec.

The oldest pieces of Dutch prose now in existence are charters of towns in Flanders and Zeeland, dated 1249, 1251 and 1254. Beatrice of Nazareth (1200–1268) was the first known prose writer in the Dutch language, the author of the notable treatise known as the Seven Ways of Holy Love. From the other Dutch mystics whose writings have reached us, the Brussels friar Jan van Ruusbroec (better known in English as the Blessed John of Ruysbroeck, 1293/4–1381), the "father of Dutch prose" stands out. A prose translation of the Old Testament was made about 1300, and there exists a Life of Jesus of around the same date. In 1403, Dirc van Delf began his Tafel van den Kersten Ghelove, an encyclopedia of Christian theology and Scholastic learning.

Interesting relics of medieval Dutch narrative, as far as the formation of the language is concerned, are the popular romances in which the romantic stories of the minstrels were translated for the benefit of the unlettered public into simple language.

== Guilds ==
The poets of the Low Countries had already discovered in late medieval times the value of guilds in promoting the arts and industrial handicrafts. The term "Collèges de Rhétorique" ("Chambers of Rhetoric") is supposed to have been introduced around 1440 to the courtiers of the Burgundian dynasty, but the institutions themselves existed long before. These literary guilds, whose members called themselves "Rederijkers" or "Rhetoricians", lasted until the end of the sixteenth century and during the greater part of that time preserved a completely medieval character, even when the influences of the Renaissance and the Reformation obliged them to modify in some degree their outward forms. They were in almost all cases absolutely middle class in tone, and opposed to aristocratic ideas and tendencies in thought.

Of these chambers, the earliest were almost entirely engaged in preparing mysteries and miracle plays for the people. The most celebrated of all the chambers, that of the Eglantine at Amsterdam, with its motto "In Liefde Bloeyende" ("Blossoming in Love"), was not instituted until 1496. And not in the Low Countries' important places only, but in almost every little town, the rhetoricians exerted their influence, mainly in what we may call a social direction. Their wealth was in most cases considerable, and it very soon became evident that no festival or procession could take place in a town unless the Chamber patronized it.

Towards the end of the fifteenth century, the Ghent chamber began to exercise a sovereign power over the other Flemish chambers, which was emulated later on in Holland by the Eglantine at Amsterdam. But this official recognition proved of no consequence in literature and it was not in Ghent but in Antwerp that intellectual life first began to stir. In Holland the burghers only formed the chambers, while in Flanders the representatives of the noble families were honorary members, and assisted with their money at the arrangement of ecclesiastical or political pageants. Their Landjuwelen, or Tournaments of Rhetoric, at which rich prizes were awarded, were the occasions upon which the members of the chambers distinguished themselves.

Between 1426 and 1620, at least 66 of these festivals were held. The grandest of all was the festival celebrated at Antwerp on August 3, 1561. The Brussels chamber sent 340 members, all on horseback and clad in crimson mantles. The town of Antwerp gave a ton of gold to be given in prizes, which were shared among 1,893 rhetoricians. This was the zenith of the splendour of the chambers, and after this time they soon fell into disfavour.

== Farce ==
Their dramatic pieces produced by the chambers were of a didactic cast, with a strong farcical flavour, and continued the tradition of Maerlant and his school. They very rarely dealt with historical or even Biblical personages, but entirely with allegorical and moral abstractions. The most notable examples of Rederijker theatre include Mariken van Nieumeghen ("Mary of Nijmegen") and Elckerlijc (which was translated into English as Everyman).

Of the pure farces of the rhetorical chambers we can speak with still more confidence, for some of them have come down to us, and among the authors famed for their skill in this sort of writing are named Cornelis Everaert of Bruges and Laurens Janssen of Haarlem. The material of these farces is extremely raw, consisting of rough jests at the expense of priests and foolish husbands, silly old men and their light wives.

The chambers also encouraged the composition of songs, but with very little success; they produced no lyrical genius more considerable than Matthijs de Casteleyn (1488–1550) of Oudenaarde, author of De Conste van Rhetorijcken ("The Art of Rhetoric").

== Anna Bijns ==
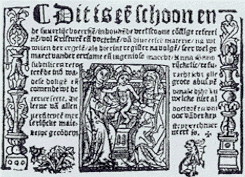
Title page of Anna Bijns' first volume of Refereinen (1528).

Early Modern Dutch literature might be said to begin with Anna Bijns (c. 1494–1575). Bijns, who is believed to have been born at Antwerp in 1494, was a schoolmistress at that city in her middle life, and in old age she still instructed youth in the Catholic religion. She died on April 10, 1575. From her work we know that she was a lay nun, that and she occupied a position of honour and influence at Antwerp. Bijns' main target were the faith and character of Luther. In her first volume of poetry (1528) the Lutherans are scarcely mentioned and focus lies on her personal experience of faith, but in that of 1538 every page is occupied with invectives against them. All the poems of Anna Bijns still extant are of the form called refereinen (refrains). Her mastery over verse form is considered remarkable. With the writings of Anna Bijns, the period of Middle Dutch closes and modern Dutch begins.

== See also ==
- Dutch folklore
- Dutch-language literature
- Van Hulthem Manuscript

== Sources ==
- Meijer, Reinder. Literature of the Low Countries: A Short History of Dutch Literature in the Netherlands and Belgium. New York: Twayne Publishers, Inc., 1971.
