= Louis III de Châtillon =

- Count of Dunois
- Died: 15 July 1391
- Spouse: Marie of Berry (m. 1386)
- House: House of Châtillon
- Father: Guy II, Count of Blois
- Mother: Marie of Namur

Louis III de Châtillon (died 15 July 1391) was a French nobleman of the House of Châtillon, styled Count of Dunois. He was the only legitimate son and heir of Guy II, Count of Blois, and Marie of Namur.

Under the terms of his marriage settlement, Louis received the county of Dunois, Châteaudun and Romorantin as an advancement of inheritance from his father. In 1386, he married Marie of Berry, daughter of John, Duke of Berry, but the marriage produced no children.

Louis died before his father on 15 July 1391. His death without issue left Guy II without a direct heir, resulting in the later sale of the Blois inheritance to Louis I, Duke of Orléans.
