= Augustijnken =

Middle Dutch poet

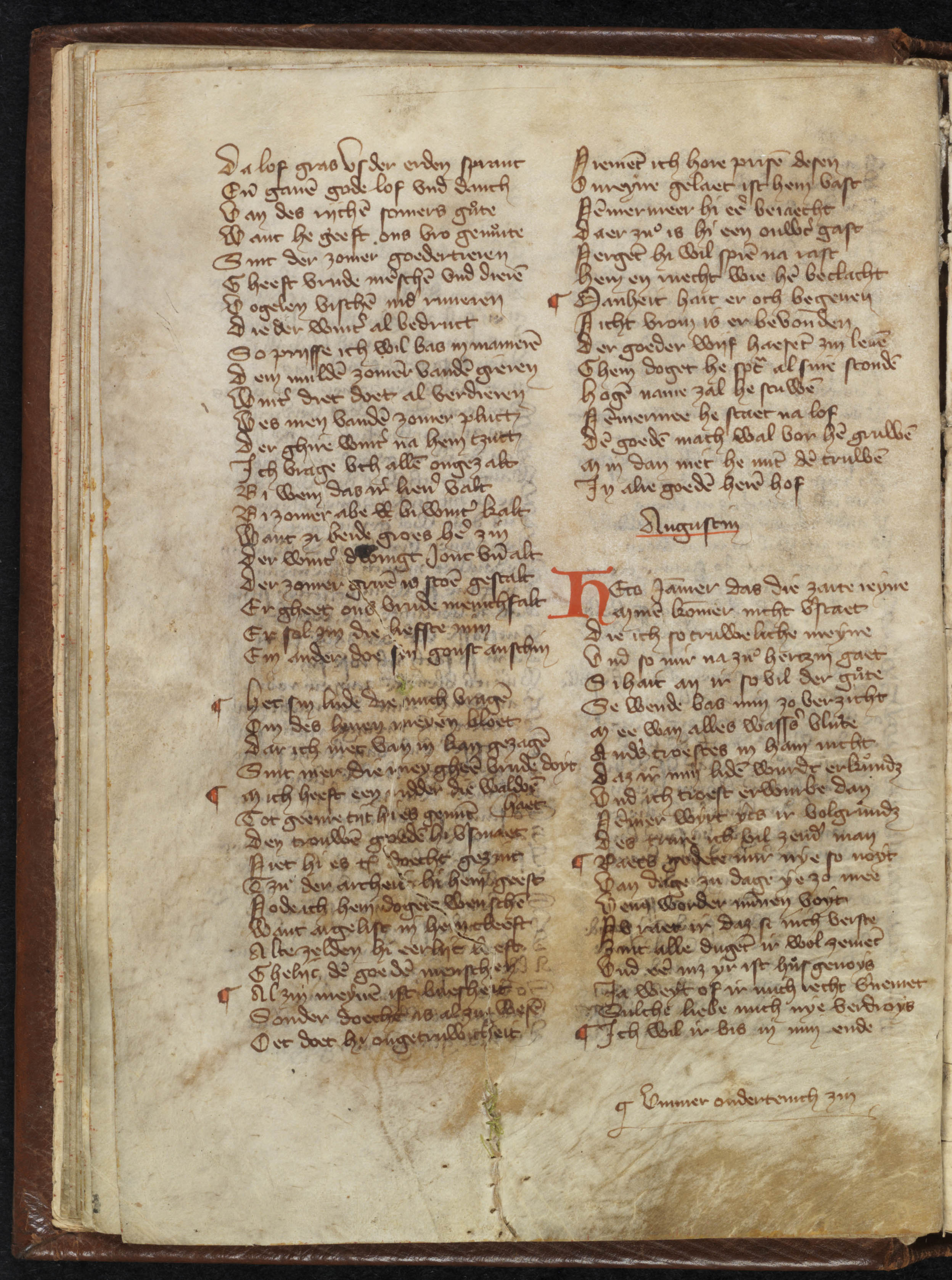
The name Augustin appears on folio 15v of the Haags Liederenhandschrift, containing his Mich heeft een ridder

Augustijnken (fl. 1358–1363) was an itinerant entertainer and writer in Middle Dutch.

Augustijnken is sometimes called van Dordt, i.e., from Dordrecht, based on two manuscripts of his Vanden scepe. He was at The Hague in the service of Count William V of Holland in 1358. Soon thereafter he entered the service of John of Blois, lord of Schoonhoven. In 1362 and 1363, he accompanied John on crusade in Prussia, during which he was injured in a bar fight and got in some legal trouble. Official records refer to him as a "storyteller", that is, a paid entertainer for the troops.

Seven works by Augustijnken are known, all relatively short. These are:

- Expositie, a learned exposition of the prologue of the Gospel of John and Augustijnken's longest work at around 1000 lines
- Dryvoldicheit, a religious poem in 316 lines about Creation and the Trinity, with special symbolic significance given to the number seven
- Vanden scepe, an allegorical short story, narrated in the first person, of a walk along and boat ride on the Merwede
- Vrouwenborch, an allegory of a virtuous woman's body
- Mich heeft een ridder
- Lijd den tijt
- Van der rijcheit

Augustijnken's work is preserved in nine different manuscripts that date to between about 1350 and 1469. Four of his pieces are found in multiple manuscripts, but three survive in single copies. The Haags liederenhandschrift contains four of his works, the most of any single manuscript.

Augustijnken is usually treated as a "lesser colleague" of his near-contemporary, Willem van Hildegaersberch.

== Bibliography ==
- Bouwmeester, Gerard (2014). "Interplay between Text and Text Collection: The Case of Augustijnken's Dryvoldicheit". Journal of the Early Book Society. 17: 242–253. ProQuest 1674357474
- Bouwmeester, Gerard (2016). Receptiegolven: De primaire, secundaire en tertiaire receptie van Augustijnkens werk (1358–2015) (PhD diss.). Utrecht University.
- Bouwmeester, Gerard (2017). "Size Does Not Matter: On Characterising Medieval Multi-Text Codices". In Karen Pratt; Bart Besamusca; Matthias Meyer; Ad Putter (eds.). Dynamics of the Medieval Manuscript: Text Collections from a European Perspective. Vandenhoeck and Ruprecht. pp. 57–79.
- Landewé, Wendy (2014). "Castles and Gender in Late Medieval Holland" (PDF). Castrum Bene. 12: 83–91.
- van Oostrom, Frits Pieter (1992). Court and Culture: Dutch Literature, 1350–1450. Translated by Arnold J. Pomerans. University of California Press.
- Warnar, Geert (2005). "Augustijnken in Pruisen: Over de Drijfveren van Een Middelnederlandse Dichter en Literatuur binnen de Duitse Orde". Jaarboek voor Middeleeuwse Geschiedenis. 8: 101–139.
