= Jeanne of Hainault =

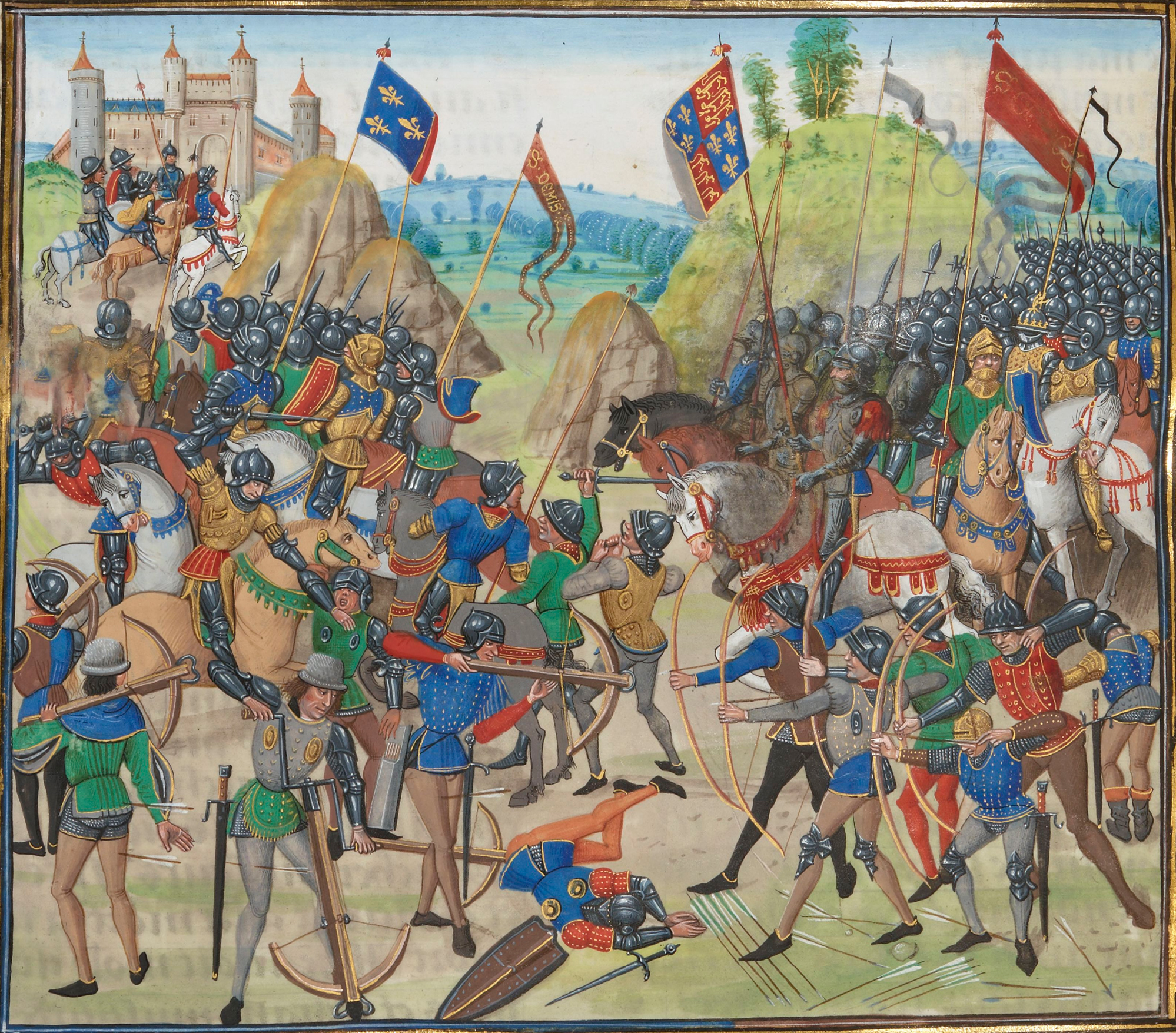
- The battle of Crécy, where Louis II, 1st husband of Jeanne, was killed.
- Born: c. 1323
- Died: December 1350
- Noble family: House of Avesnes
- Spouses: Louis II, Count of Blois; William I, Marquis of Namur
- Issue: Louis III, Count of Blois and Soissons; John II, Count of Blois; Guy II, Count of Blois and Soissons
- Father: John of Beaumont
- Mother: Margaret of Soissons

Jeanne (or Johanna) of Hainault (1323 – December 1350) was ruling Countess of Soissons from 1344 until 1350.

== Biography ==
She was a daughter of John of Beaumont, lord of Beaumont and Margaret of Soissons. She succeeded her mother in 1344 as Countess of Soissons.

Jeanne first married Louis II, Count of Blois. Together they had three sons:

- Louis III, Count of Blois and Soissons
- John II, Count of Blois
- Guy II, Count of Blois and Soissons.

Louis II died in 1346 at the battle of Crécy and Jeanne remarried to William I, Marquis of Namur. They had no children.

She died in 1350 from the Black Death.
