= Middle Dutch =

West Germanic language of the High and Late Middle Ages

- dietsc, duutsch
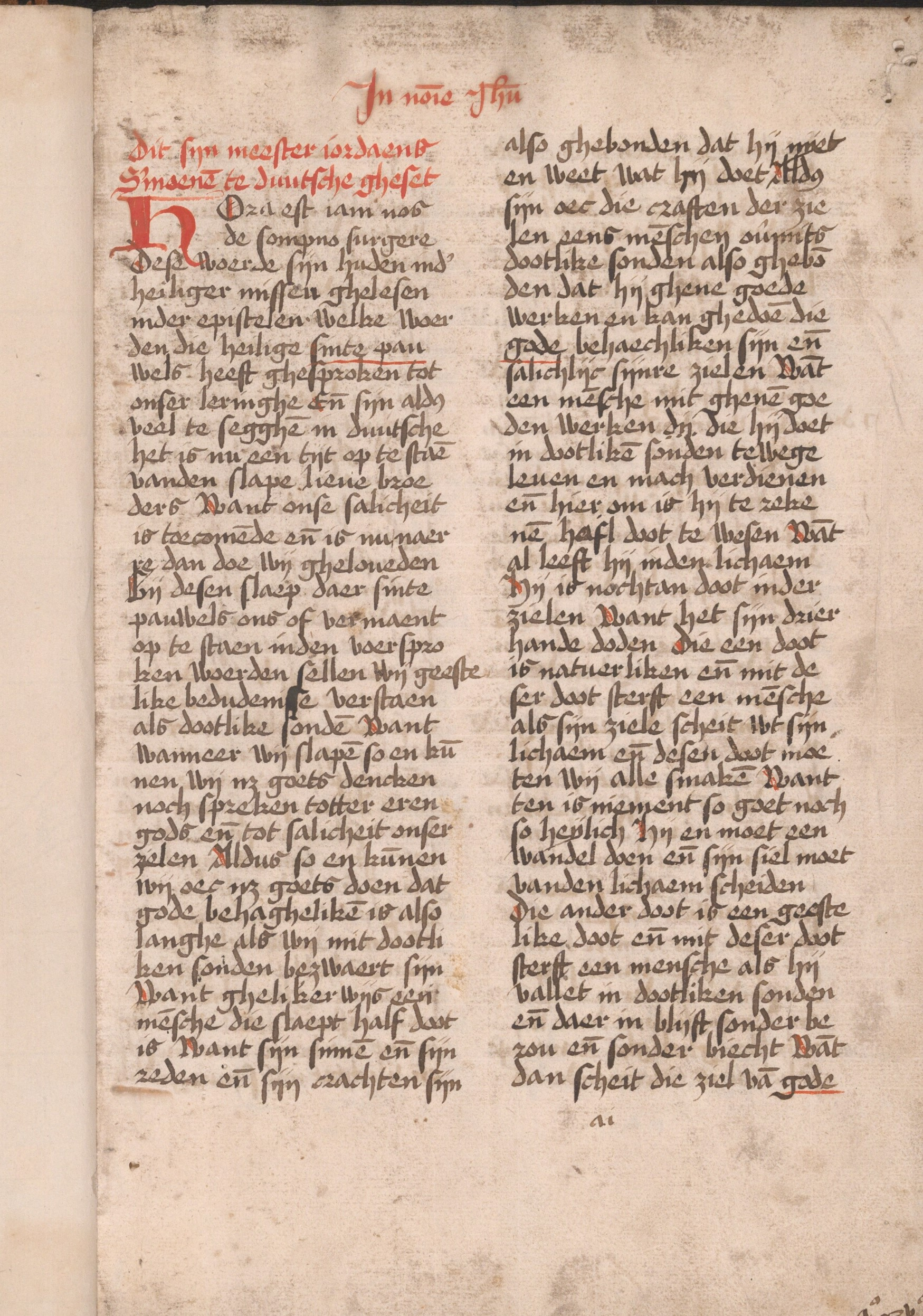
- Region: The Low Countries
- Era: Developed into modern Dutch around 1500 or c. 1550
- Language family: Indo-European: Germanic; West Germanic; Istvaeonic; Low Franconian; Middle Dutch
- Early forms: Frankish: Old Dutch
- Writing system: Latin

Language codes
- ISO 639-2: dum
- ISO 639-3: dum
- Glottolog: midd1321

Middle Dutch is a collective name for a number of closely related West Germanic dialects whose ancestor was Old Dutch. It was spoken and written between 1150 and 1500. Until the advent of Modern Dutch after 1500 or c. 1550, there was no overarching standard language, but all dialects were mutually intelligible. During that period, a rich Medieval Dutch literature developed, which had not yet existed during Old Dutch. The various literary works of the time are often very readable for speakers of Modern Dutch since Dutch is a rather conservative language.

== Phonology ==
=== Differences with Old Dutch ===
Several phonological changes occurred leading up to the Middle Dutch period.

- Earlier Old Dutch /ie/, /ia/, /io/ merge into /iə/ already in Old Dutch.
- Voiceless fricatives become voiced syllable-initially: /s/ > /z/, /f/ > /v/ (merging with /v/ from Proto-Germanic /b/), /θ/ > /ð/. (10th or 11th century) The allophonic voicing of /h/ to [ɦ] (also found in modern Dutch) is also likely in that period, by analogy with the rest of the fricatives.
- /ft/ > /xt/
- /iu/ > /yː/ or /iə/. The outcome is dialect-specific, with /iə/ found in more western dialects and /yː/ further east. This results in later pairs such as dietsc /diətsk/ versus duitsc /dyːtsk/.
  - Various dialects also show /iw/ > /yw/, while others retain /iw/. Compare southeastern Middle Dutch hiwen /hiwən/ with modern Dutch huwen /ɦyʋə(n)/.
  - In word-initial position, some northern dialects also show a change from a falling to a rising diphthong (/iu/ > /juː/) like Old Frisian. Cf. the accusative second-person plural pronoun iu /iu/ > northern jou /jɔu/ versus southern u /yː/.
- Phonemisation of umlaut for back vowels, resulting in a new phoneme /y/ (from earlier Old Dutch /u/ before /i/ or /j/). In western dialects (including Hollandic, Zeelandic, Flemish), only short vowels were affected. In eastern dialects (Kleverlandish, Limburgish, most of Brabantian), long vowels and diphthongs were affected as well, as they were in other Germanic languages.
- Insertion of /w/ between /uː/ and a vowel.
- Syllable-final /uː(w)/ > /ouw/ in some areas. This created pairs such as duwen /dywən/ versus douwen /dou(w)ən/, or nu /ny/ versus nou /nou/.
- Lowering of /u/ > /o/ when not umlauted.
  - This change did not (fully) occur in the southwestern (Flemish) dialects. Hence, these dialects retain sunne "sun" where others have sonne.
- Fronting of /u/, /uː/ > /y/, /yː/. In some dialects, /uː/ remained syllable-finally or before /w/.
  - This change did not occur in Limburgish.
  - In Flemish, this change also affected cases that escaped the lowering in the previous change, hence sunne /ˈzynnə/.
- Vowel reduction: Vowels in unstressed syllables are weakened and merge into /ə/, spelled ⟨e⟩. (11th or 12th century) Long vowels seem to have remained as such, at least /iː/ is known to have remained in certain suffixes (such as -kijn /kiːn/).
- Diphthongisation of the long mid vowels: /eː/, /øː/ /oː/ > /eɛ/, /øœ/, /oɔ/.
- Non-phonemic lowering of short /i/, /y/ > /ɪ/, /ʏ/.
- Open syllable lengthening: Short vowels in stressed open syllables become long. As a result, all stressed syllables in polysyllabic words become heavy. Old Dutch (original) long vowels are called "sharp-long" and indicated with a circumflex (â, ê, î, ô). Lengthened vowels are "soft-long" and are indicated with a macron (ā, ē, ī, ō).
  - Lengthened vowels initially have the same vowel quality as the short variants, so this produces [aː], [eː], [ɪː], [oː], [ʏː].
  - [ɪː] and [ʏː] are then lowered to [eː] and [øː] respectively.
  - Lengthened [eː], [øː], [oː] remain distinct from the previously diphthongised long mid vowels.
  - In most dialects, lengthened [aː] merges with original /aː/, but in some, a distinction in backness develops.
  - This introduces many length alternations in grammatical paradigms, e.g. singular dag /dax/, plural dag(h)e /daːɣə/.
- Dental fricatives become stops: /ð/ > /d/, /θ/ > /t/, merging with existing /t/ and /d/. (around 12th century)
  - The geminate /θθ/ (originating from Germanic *-þj-) develops into /ss/: *withtha > wisse, *smiththa > smisse.
- L-vocalisation: /ol/ and /al/ > /ou/ before dentals.
  - This change does not occur in Limburgish, which retains the distinction but undergoes its own round of vocalisation in modern times, producing /ow/ and /aː/ respectively.
- Lengthening of vowels before /r/ + dental consonant. This did not occur in all dialects, and in some, /e/ was lengthened to /aː/. E.g. farth /farθ/ > vāert /vaːrt/, ertha /erθa/ > āerde /aːrdə/, wort /wort/ > wōort /woːrt/.
- Syncope of schwa /ə/ in certain environments, particularly inflectional endings. This phonemicises the soft-long vowels produced by open syllable lengthening, which can now also occur in closed syllables. E.g. hēvet > hēeft.

=== Consonants ===
The consonants of Middle Dutch differed little from those of Old Dutch. The most prominent change is the loss of dental fricatives. In addition the sound [z] was phonemicised during this period, judging from loanwords that retain [s] to this day.

For descriptions of the sounds and definitions of the terms, follow the links on the headings.

Middle Dutch consonant phonemes
		Labial	Dental/ Alveolar	Palatal	Velar	Glottal
Nasal		m	n			
Plosive	voiceless	p	t		k	
Plosive	voiced	b	d			
Fricative	voiceless	f	s		x	
Fricative	voiced	v	z		ɣ	h
Approximant			l	j	w	
Trill			r			

Notes:

- All obstruents underwent final-obstruent devoicing as in Old and Modern Dutch.
- During the first part of the Middle Dutch period, geminated varieties of most consonants still occurred. Geminated /ɣ/ was a plosive /ɡɡ/, retained in modern Limburgish as /ɡ/.
- /m, p, b/ were bilabial, whereas /f, v/ were labiodental.
- /n, t, d, l/ could have been either dental [n̪, t̪, d̪, l̪] or alveolar [n͇, t͇, d͇, l͇]. Laminal pronunciation is likely even in the latter case as it is universally found in modern Dutch, at least for the first three.
  - /n/ had a velar allophone [ŋ] when it occurred before the velars /k, ɣ/. In that position, /ɣ/ was realized as a plosive [ɡ], rather than a fricative found in other positions.
- /s, z/ were most likely retracted [s̠, z̠].
- /w/ could have been a bilabial approximant [β̞], without the velar element. This is commonly found in modern Southern dialects.
- /r/ was alveolar, either a trill [r] or a tap [ɾ]. Uvular pronunciations [ʀ] and [ʁ] were not widespread (as they are in modern Dutch) and were probably considered idiolectal or even a speech impediment.

=== Vowels ===
Most notable in the Middle Dutch vowel system, when compared to Old Dutch, is the appearance of phonemic rounded front vowels, and the merger of all unstressed short vowels.

==== Short vowels ====
Middle Dutch short vowels
	Front unrounded	Front rounded	Central	Back
Close	ɪ	ʏ		
Mid	e	ʏ	ə	o
Open	a			

- The exact height of /ʏ/ is not certain, and may have varied between actual [ʏ] and a lower [ø] or even [œ].
- /e/ and /o/ could have also been [ɛ] and [ɔ], as in modern Dutch. Especially the former is likely as /e/ could not have been higher than [ɛ̝] without seriously threatening the contrast with /ɪ/.
- /a/ was a back [ɑ] in most varieties, but front [a] probably occurred in some western dialects. One likely candidate is Utrechts, in which the short ⟨a⟩ is famously very front in contemporary Dutch.

==== Long vowels and diphthongs ====
Long vowels and diphthongs cannot be clearly distinguished in Middle Dutch, as many long vowels had or developed a diphthongal quality, while existing diphthongs could also develop into monophthongs. Sometimes, this occurred only in restricted dialects, other developments were widespread.

Middle Dutch long vowels
	Front unr.	Front rnd.	Back
Close	iː	yː	(uː)
Close-opening	ie̯	(yø̯)	uo̯
Mid-opening	eɛ̯	(øœ̯)	oɔ̯
Mid	eː	øː	oː
Open	aː		ɑː
Closing	ɛi̯	(œy̯)	ɔu̯

- The rounded front vowels in brackets only occurred in the eastern dialects, where umlaut of long vowels and diphthongs occurred.
- The rounded back vowel /uː/ only occurred in the Limburgish dialects.

Many details of the exact phonetics are uncertain, and seemed to have differed by dialect. The overall system is clear, however, as almost all the vowels remain distinct in modern Limburgish: /iː/, /iə̯/, /eɛ̯/, /eː/ and /aː/ appear in modern Limburgish as /iː/, /eː/, /iə̯/, /æː/ and /aː/ respectively.

The vowels /ie̯/, /yø̯/ and /uo̯/ developed from Old Dutch opening diphthongs, but their exact character in Middle Dutch is unclear. The following can be said:

- In eastern Brabant, and all of Limburg, the pronunciation remained diphthongal.
- /ie̯/ is frequently found written with just ⟨i⟩, which may indicate a monophthongal pronunciation. /ie̯/ never merged with the long vowel /iː/, however, as no rhyme pairs between these vowels are found.
- In the coastal areas (Flanders, Holland), /uo̯/ seems to have been a monophthong [oː] or [ʊː]. Before velar and labial consonants, the pronunciation was a close [uː]. This is revealed by the distinction in spelling between ⟨oe⟩ and ⟨ou⟩.
- In western Brabant, the pronunciation of /uo̯/ was more close, probably monophthongal /uː/.

The vowels /eɛ̯/, /øœ̯/ and /oɔ̯/, termed "sharp-long" and denoted with a circumflex ê ô, developed from Old Dutch long vowels. The opening diphthong pronunciation was probably widespread, and perhaps once universal, as it is nowadays still found in both West Flemish and in Limburgish, at opposite ends of the Middle Dutch language area. In the general area in between, including standard Dutch, the vowels merged with the "soft-long" vowels during the early modern Dutch period.

- In southern Flanders, southern Brabant and Holland, /eɛ̯/ appears spelled with ⟨ie⟩ (e.g. stien for steen), while /ie̯/ appears with ⟨e⟩ (e.g. speghel for spieghel), suggesting a merger between these phonemes.
- /oɔ̯/ is sometimes found to rhyme with /oː/. It is possible that the two vowels merged under some conditions, while remaining distinct in other cases.
- In Brabant, /oɔ̯/ occasionally rhymes with /uo̯/. In western Brabant, this implies a close monophthongal pronunciation [uː].

The vowels /eː/, /øː/ and /oː/, termed "soft-long" and denoted with a macron ē ō, developed through the lengthening of Old Dutch short vowels in open syllables, but also frequently before /r/. They were simple monophthongs in all Middle Dutch dialects, with the exception of western Flanders where /eː/ later developed into /ei̯/. They might have been close-mid but also perhaps open-mid [ɛː], [œː] and [ɔː], as in modern Limburgish.

Bruce Donaldson argues that it is possible that, contrary to the widespread IPA transcription [eː øː oː], the outcome of the merger between the "sharp-long" and "soft-long" mid vowels has never been monophthongal in Hollandic dialects; instead, the two series have merged into narrow closing diphthongs [ei øy ou]. This would mean that the original [ai au] diphthongs from which the sharp-long vowels come have never been monophthongized in that area and words like steen [stein] 'stone' and boom [boum] 'tree' have always contained diphthongs in Hollandic, as the Standard German and Limburgish cognates Stein [ʃtaɪn], stein [stɛin], Baum [baʊm] and boum [bɔum] do, with the difference lying in quality. Furthermore, speakers with the Polder Dutch shift nowadays pronounce steen and boom almost indistinguishably from the Limburgish cognates, as [stɛin] and [bɔum].

There were two open vowels, with "sharp-long" â developed from the Old Dutch long ā, and "soft-long" ā being the result of lengthening. These two vowels were distinguished only in Limburgish and Low Rhenish at the eastern end, and in western Flemish and coastal Hollandic on the western end. The relative backness of the two vowels was opposite in the two areas that distinguished them.

- On the coast, â was front /aː/ or /æː/, while ā was central or back /ɑː/.
- In the eastern varieties, â was back /ɑː/, while ā was front or central /aː/. /ɑː/ merged into /oː/ during Middle Dutch, first in Low Rhenish, then later also in Limburgish further south.
- In all dialects between, the two vowels were not distinguished. The phonetic realisation ranged from back [ɑː] (in Brabant) to front [aː ~ æː] (Holland further inland).

The closing diphthong /ɛi̯/ remained from the corresponding Old Dutch diphthong. It occurred primarily in umlauting environments, with /eɛ̯/ appearing otherwise. Some dialects, particularly further west, had /eɛ̯/ in all environments (thus cleene next to cleine). Limburgish preserved the diphthong wherever it was preserved in High German.

The closing diphthong /ɔu̯/ has two different origins. In the vast majority of the Middle Dutch area, it developed through l-vocalization from older /ol/ and /al/ followed by a dental consonant. In the eastern area, Limburg in particular, it was a remnant of the older diphthong as in High German, which had developed into /oɔ̯/ elsewhere. L-vocalization occurred only in the modern period in Limburgish, and the distinction between /ol/ and /al/ was preserved, being reflected as ów and aa respectively.

=== Prosody ===
In Limburgish, pitch accent (known in Dutch dialectology as the distinction between stoottoon 'push tone' and sleeptoon 'dragging tone') was phonemicized at the beginning of the Middle Dutch period. It causes pairs like bein /ˈbɛin/ 'legs' vs. bein /ˈbɛ́in/ 'leg' to be distinguished by tone (and, secondarily, length, since the push tone shortens the entire syllable). This is also true of Central Franconian, spoken to the southeast.

=== Changes during the Middle Dutch period ===
Phonological changes that occurred during Middle Dutch:

- /mb/ > /mː/, /ŋɡ/ > /ŋː/. This eliminated the sound /ɡ/ from the language altogether.
  - /p/ and /k/ originating from /b/ and /ɡ/ through final devoicing were not affected. This therefore resulted in alternations such as singular coninc /koːniŋk/ versus plural coninghe /koːniŋːə/, singular lamp /lamp/ versus plural lammere /lamː(ə)rə/.
- /sk/ > /sx/ (spelled ⟨sc⟩ or later ⟨sch⟩). It is unclear when this change happened, as the spelling does not seem to differentiate the two sounds (that is, ⟨sc⟩ and ⟨sch⟩ could both represent either sound).
- /ɛ/ > /ɛi/ before /n/ plus another consonant, merging with original Old Dutch /ɛi/ (< Proto-Germanic /ɑi/). E.g. ende > einde, pensen > peinsen (from Old French penser). This change is found sporadically in Old Dutch already, but becomes more frequent in some Middle Dutch areas.
- Epenthesis of /d/ in various clusters of sonorants. E.g. donre > donder, solre > solder, bunre > bunder. In modern Dutch, this change has become grammaticalised for the -er (comparative, agent noun) suffix when attached to a word ending in -r.
- Shortening of geminate consonants, e.g. for bidden /bɪdːən/ > /bɪdən/, which reintroduces stressed light syllables in polysyllabic words.
- Early diphthongization of long high vowels: /iː/ > /ɪi/ and /yː/ > /ʏy/ except before /r/ and /w/, probably beginning around the 14th century.
  - The diphthongal quality of these vowels became stronger over time, and eventually the former merged with /ɛi/ ei. But the diphthongal pronunciation was still perceived as unrefined and 'southern' by educated speakers in the sixteenth century, showing that the change had not yet spread to all areas and layers of Dutch society by that time. Similarly, the onset of /ʏy/ eventually became as low as [œy], becoming the rounded counterpart of /ɛi/.
  - Notably, this diphthongization parallels the mutation of long high vowels in the Great Vowel Shift of Late Middle English and Early New High German. However, those languages lowered previous /iː/ all the way to /aɪ/. In Modern Dutch, many speakers from the Randstad region exhibit parallel lowering to [ai, ay] from the conservative [ɛi, œy] (see Polder Dutch).
- Following the previous change, monophthongization of opening diphthongs: /iə/ > /iː/, /uə/ > /uː/. The result might have also been a short vowel (as in most Dutch dialects today), but they are known to have remained long at least before /r/. As the tense /i, y, u, eː, øː, oː/ often feature a schwa offglide before /r/ in contemporary Northern Dutch, it is possible that those dialects have never monophthongized /iə/ and /uə/ in that position; instead, they became mere allophones of /i/ and /u/ before /r/.
- Beginning in late Middle Dutch and continuing into the early Modern Dutch period, schwa /ə/ was slowly lost word-finally and in some other unstressed syllables: vrouwe > vrouw, hevet > heeft. This did not apply consistently however, and sometimes both forms continued to exist side by side, such as mate and maat.
  - Word-final schwa was restored in the past singular of weak verbs, to avoid homophony with the present third-person singular because of word-final devoicing. However, it was lost in all irregular weak verbs, in which this homophony was not an issue: irregular dachte > dacht (present tense denkt), but regular opende did not become *opend /oːpənt/ because it would become indistinguishable from opent.
- During the 15th century at the earliest, /d/ begins to disappear when between a non-short vowel and a schwa.
  - The actual outcome of this change differed between dialects. In the more northern varieties and in Holland, the /d/ was simply lost, along with any schwa that followed it: luyden > lui, lade > la, mede > mee. In the southeast, intervocalic /d/ instead often became /j/: mede > meej.
  - The change was not applied consistently, and even in modern Dutch today many words have been retained in both forms. In some cases the forms with lost /d/ were perceived as uneducated and disappeared again, such as in Nederland and neer, both from neder (the form Neerland does exist, but is rather archaic in modern Dutch).

== Dialects ==
Middle Dutch was not a single homogeneous language. The language differed by area, with different areas having a different pronunciation and often using different vocabulary. The dialect areas were affected by political boundaries. The sphere of political influence of a certain ruler also created a sphere of linguistic influence, with the language within the area becoming more homogeneous. Following, more or less, the political divisions of the time, several large dialect groups can be distinguished. However, the borders between them were not strong, and a dialect continuum existed between them, with spoken varieties near the edges of each dialect area showing more features of the neighbouring areas.

Middle Dutch has four major dialects groups:

1. Flemish in Flanders and Zeeuws in Zeeland,
2. Brabantic in Brussels, Leuven, Antwerp, Mechelen, Breda,
3. Hollandic in the county of Holland,
4. Limburgic in the East.

Flemish, Brabantic and Hollandic are known as West Franconian, while Limburgic is known as East Franconian (not to be confused with the High German dialect East Franconian).

In a finer classification there are:

- Flemish
  - West Flemish
  - East Flemish
- Brabantic
  - West Brabantic
  - East Brabantic
- Hollandic
- Utrechts
- Limburgic

=== Brabantian ===
Brabantian was spoken primarily in the Duchy of Brabant. It was an influential dialect during most of the Middle Ages, during the so-called "Brabantian expansion" in which the influence of Brabant was extended outwards into other areas. Compared to the other dialects, Brabantian was a kind of "middle ground" between the coastal areas on one hand, and the Rhineland and Limburg on the other. Brabantian Middle Dutch has the following characteristics compared to other dialects:

- Merger of â and ā, articulated as a back vowel [ɑː].
- Use of the form g(h)i for the second-person plural pronoun.
- /ft/ > /xt/
- Early diphthongization of /iː/ and /yː/.
- Tended towards Rhinelandic and/or Limburgish in the easternmost areas, with umlaut of long vowels and diphthongs. This in turn led to stronger use of umlaut as a grammatical feature, in for example diminutives.
- Lack of umlaut /a/ > /e/ before /xt/, in western varieties.

=== Flemish ===
Flemish, consisting today of West and East Flemish and Zeelandic, was spoken in the County of Flanders, northern parts of the County of Artois and areas around the towns of Calais and Boulogne-sur-Mer. Though due to their intermediary position between West Flemish and Brabantian, the East Flemish dialects have also been grouped with the latter. Flemish had been influential during the earlier Middle Ages (the "Flemish expansion") but lost prestige to the neighbouring Brabantian in the 13th century. Its characteristics are:

- Fronted realisation /æː/ for â.
- Unrounding of rounded front vowels.
- Loss of /h/, with the occasional hypercorrection found in texts. This allowed /x/ and /ɣ/ to eventually weaken to [h] and [ɦ] without any threat of a merger with /h/, a pronunciation found in modern Flemish.
- Opening diphthong articulation of ê and ô, often spelled ⟨ee⟩ and ⟨oe⟩.
- Old Dutch /iu/ developed into /iə/ instead of /yː/, thus giving forms such as vier ("fire") where other dialects have vuur.
- Lowering of /e/ to /a/ before /r/ + consonant, often also with lengthening. The change is generally limited to West Flemish before dentals, while before labials and velars it is more widespread.
- Lack of umlaut /a/ > /e/ before /xt/.
- /i/ > /e/ in some words.
- /o/ > /e/ sometimes before /r/ + consonant in West Flemish.

=== Hollandic ===
Hollandic was spoken in the County of Holland. It was less influential during most of the Middle Ages but became more so in the 16th century during the "Hollandic expansion", during which the Eighty Years' War took place in the south. It shows the following properties:

- Strong Ingvaeonic influence from earlier Frisian presence in the area. This became more apparent closer to the coast and further north (West Friesland).
- â and ā merged and had a fronted articulation [aː] (which forms the basis for the modern standard Dutch pronunciation).
- Occasional occurrence of the Ingvaeonic nasal-spirant law. Seen in some place names, such as -mude ("mouth") where more southwestern areas retain the nasal: -monde.
- Use of the form ji for the second-person plural pronoun.
- Retention of /ft/.
- Lack of umlaut /a/ > /e/ before /xt/.

=== Limburgish ===
Limburgish was spoken by the people in the provinces of modern Dutch and Belgian Limburg. It was not clearly tied to one political area, instead being divided among various areas, including the Duchy of Limburg (which was south of modern Limburg). It was also the most divergent of the dialects.

- Generally, a strong "southeastern" influence, tying it more to Middle High German in some respects ("Colognian expansion"). The effects of the High German consonant shift are occasionally found.
- Related to the above, emergence of a phonemic pitch accent, both in Limburgish and Central Franconian.
- Umlaut affects all vowels and is morphologically significant.
- Retention of the older Germanic diphthongs /ɛi/ and /ɔu/ where other Middle Dutch dialects (with the possible exception of Hollandic, see above) have monophthongized these to /eː/ and /oː/.
- Retention of /u/ (did not merge with /o/) and /uː/ (remained as a close back monophthong /uː/ resisting diphthongization, cf. modern Dutch /œy/).
- Orthography is also more eastern. ⟨u⟩ represents a back vowel, and vowel length in closed syllables is not marked.
- Full use of du as the second-person singular pronoun.
- Long a in words ending in a single consonant, e.g. blaet for blat, gaef for gaf, etc. and before /l/, /n/, /s/, /x/ + dental,

=== Kleverlandish ===
Kleverlandish ("Kleverlands") was spoken around the area of the Duchy of Cleves, around the Lower Rhine. It represented a transitional dialect between Limburgish and Middle Low German.

- It had an eastern influence, with a more eastern-tinted orthography. Umlaut was a regular grammatical feature.
- Stronger Middle Low German influence.

== Orthography ==
Middle Dutch was written in the Latin alphabet, which was not designed for writing Middle Dutch so different scribes used different methods of representing the sounds of their language in writing. The traditions of neighbouring scribes and their languages led to a multitude of ways to write Middle Dutch. Consequently, spelling was not standardised but was highly variable and could differ by both time and place as various "trends" in spelling waxed and waned. Furthermore, a word could be found spelled differently in different occurrences within the same text. There was the matter of personal taste, and many writers thought it was more aesthetic to follow French or Latin practice, leading to sometimes rather unusual spellings.

The spelling was generally phonetic, and words were written based on how they were spoken rather than based on underlying phonemes or morphology. Final-obstruent devoicing was reflected in the spelling, and clitic pronouns and articles were frequently joined to the preceding or following word. Scribes wrote in their own dialect, and their spelling reflected the pronunciation of that particular scribe or of some prestige dialect by which the scribe was influenced. The modern Dutch word maagd ("maiden") for example was sometimes written as maghet or maegt, but also meget, magt, maget, magd, and mecht. Some spellings, such as magd, reflect an early tendency to write the underlying phonemic value. However, by and large, spelling was phonetic, which is logical as people usually read texts out loud.

Modern dictionaries tend to represent words in a normalised spelling to form a compromise between the variable spellings on one hand and to represent the sounds of the language consistently. Thus, normalised spellings attempt to be a general or "average" spelling but still being accurate and true to the language.

In Limburgish, pitch accent was not indicated in spelling, a practice followed to this day.

=== Vowels ===
The general practice was to write long vowels with a single letter in an open syllable and with two letters in a closed syllable. Which two letters were used varied among texts. Some texts, especially those in the east, do not do so and write long vowels with a single letter in all cases (as is the predominant rule in modern German).

Phoneme	Normalised	Other spellings	Notes
/a/	a		
/e/	e		
/ɪ/	i	j, y	
/o/	o		
/ʏ/	u	v	
/ə/	e	a (rare and early)	
/aː/	a (open) ae (closed)	ai (occasionally, in closed syllables)	In discussions about pronunciation, originally-long a is represented as â, lengthened a as ā.
/ɛː/	e (open) ee (closed)	ei (West Flemish)	In discussions about pronunciation, written as ē.
/eː/	e (open) ee (closed)	ee (frequently in open syllables, especially in Flanders), ie (occasionally in some dialects)	In discussions about pronunciation, written as ê.
/øː/	ue	o, oe, eu (rare), u, uu (both very rare)	⟨oe⟩ and ⟨o⟩ are perhaps the most common, but normalisation uses ⟨ue⟩ to avoid confusion with /uə/. Normalisation generally undoes the umlaut of older /oː/, which was only present in the eastern dialects.
/iː/	i (open) ij (closed)	ii (actually graphical variant of ij), ie (rare, usually before /r/)	
/iə/	ie	ye (rare), i (fairly rare)	
/ɔː/	o (open) oo (closed)	oe, a (Rhinelandic), oi, oy	In discussions about pronunciation, written as ō.
/oː/	o (open) oo (closed)	oe, oi, oy	In discussions about pronunciation, written as ô.
/uə/	oe	ou (Flanders), u, ue (both in Limburg), o (before /j/), uo	
/yː/, /uː/	u (open) uu (closed)	ue (usually before /r/), ui, uy	/uː/ only in Limburg.
/ei/	ei	ey	Occurs in place of ê in Limburg.
/ou/	ou	au (rare)	Occurs in place of ô in Limburg.
/a(ː)u/	au	aeu	

=== Consonants ===
Phoneme	Normalised	Other spellings	Notes
/j/	j	i, y, ij (very rare)	
/w/	w	uu, u, v	
/l/	l		
/r/	r		
/m/	m		
/n/, [ŋ]	n		
/p/	p		
/b/	b		
/f/	f		
/v/	v	u	
/t/	t	th (occasionally)	
/d/	d		
/s/	s		
/sk/, /sx/	sch sc (in some normalisations)	sk, ssc(h) (medially), s (occasionally)	
/z/	s	z (occasionally)	
/k/	k (before e, i, y) c (elsewhere) qu (representing /kw/) ck (for geminated /kː/)	ch (Flanders, Brabant), k (eastern, in all positions)	
/x/	ch	g, gh (when /ɣ/ devoices)	
/ɣ/, [ɡ]	g gh (before e, i, y, only in some normalisations) cg(h) (for geminated /ɡː/)		
/h/	h		

== Grammar ==
=== Nouns ===
Middle Dutch nouns inflected for number as well as case. The weakening of unstressed syllables merged many different Old Dutch classes of nominal declension. The result was a general distinction between strong and weak nouns. Eventually even these started to become confused, with the strong and weak endings slowly beginning to merge into a single declension class by the beginning of the modern Dutch period.

==== Strong nouns ====
The strong nouns generally originated from the Old Dutch a-stem, i-stem and u-stem inflections. They mostly had a nominative singular with no ending, and a nominative plural in -e or, for some neuter nouns, with no ending. Most strong nouns were masculine or neuter. Feminines in this class were former i-stems, and could lack an ending in the dative singular, a remnant of the late Old Dutch inflection. In some rare occasions, the genitive singular was also endingless. Some nouns ended in -e in the singular also; these were primarily former ja-stems, which were masculine or neuter. A few were former i-stems with short stems. Nouns of this type tended to be drawn into the weak inflection by analogy.

The following table shows the inflection of the masculine noun dach "day", feminine dâet "deed" and neuter brôot "bread".

	Singular	Plural	Singular	Plural	Singular	Plural
Nominative, Accusative	dach	dāge	dâet	dâde	brôot	brôot, brôde
Genitive	dāechs, dāges	dāge	dâets, dâdes	dâde	brôots, brôdes	brôde
Dative	dāge	dāgen	dâet, dâde	dâden	brôde	brôden

==== Weak nouns ====
Weak nouns were characterised by the ending -en throughout the plural. The singular ended in -e.

The following table shows the inflection of the masculine noun bōge "bow, arc".

	Singular	Plural
Nominative, Accusative	bōge	bōgen
Genitive	bōgen	bōgen
Dative	bōge	bōgen

=== Adjectives ===
Middle Dutch adjectives inflected according to the gender, case and number of the noun they modified.

The Germanic distinction between strong and weak, or indefinite and definite inflection, was fairly minimal in Middle Dutch, appearing only in the masculine and neuter nominative singular. These forms received an -e ending when a definite word (demonstrative, article) preceded, and had no ending otherwise. Adjectives were uninflected when connected through a copula. Thus, even for feminine nouns, no ending appeared: die vrouwe is goet "the lady is good".

Some adjectives, namely the former ja-stems, had an -e even in the strong and copular form, e.g. die vrouwe is cleine "the lady is small".

	Masculine	Feminine	Neuter	Plural
Nominative	goet (indef) goede (defn)	goede	goet (indef) goede (defn)	goede
Accusative	goeden	goede	goet (indef) goede (defn)	goede
Genitive	goets	goeder	goets	goeder
Dative	goeden	goeder	goeden	goeden

=== Pronouns ===
Middle Dutch pronouns differed little from their modern counterparts. The main differences were in the second person with the development of a T-V distinction. The second-person plural pronoun ghi slowly gained use as a respectful second-person singular form. The original singular pronoun du gradually fell out of use during the Middle Dutch period. A new second person plural pronoun was created by contraction of gij/jij and lui ('people') forming gullie/jullie (literally, 'you people').

	Singular					Plural		
	1st	2nd	3rd			1st	2nd	3rd
	1st	2nd	Masc.	Fem.	Neut.	1st	2nd	3rd
Nominative	ic, icke	du	hi	si	het/'t	wi	ghi	si
Accusative	mi	di	hem/hen/'n	haer/se	het/'t	ons	u	hem/hen/'n
Dative	mi	di	hem/hen/'n	haer	hem	ons	u	hem/hen/'n
Genitive	mijns	dijns	sijns	harer	'es	onser	uwer	haer/'re

Note: There are several other forms.

=== Determiners ===
Definite Article
(die, dat = the)

Grammatical Case	Male	Female	Neuter
Singular
Nominative	die	die	dat
Accusative	den	die	dat
Dative	den	der	den
Genitive	des	der	des
Plural
Nominative	die		
Accusative	die		
Dative	den		
Genitive	der		

=== Verbs ===
Middle Dutch mostly retained the Old Dutch verb system. Like all Germanic languages, it distinguished strong, weak and preterite-present verbs as the three main inflectional classes. Verbs were inflected in present and past tense, and in three moods: indicative, subjunctive and imperative.

The weakening of unstressed vowels affected the distinction between the indicative and subjunctive moods, which had largely been determined by the vowel of the inflectional suffix in Old Dutch. In Middle Dutch, with all unstressed vowels merging into one, the subjunctive became distinguished from the indicative only in the singular but was identical to it in the plural, and also in the past tense of weak verbs. That led to a gradual decline in the use of the subjunctive, and it has been all but lost entirely in modern Dutch.

==== Strong verbs ====
The seven classes of strong verb common to the Germanic languages were retained. The four principal parts were the present tense, first- and third-person singular past tense, remaining past tense, and the past participle.

Class	Present	Past 1/3 sg	Past rest	Ptcp.	Example verbs
1	î	ê	ē	ē	bliven
2	ie, û	ô	ō	ō	bieden, bugen
3	e, i	a	o	o	helpen, binden
4	ē	a	â	ō	stelen
5	ē, i	a	â	ē	lesen, liggen
6	ā	oe	oe	â	dragen
7	(any)	ie	ie	(any)	slapen

In classes 6 and 7, there was no distinction between the two different vowels of the past tense. In classes 4 and 5, the difference was primarily one of length, since ā and â were not distinguished in most dialects. The difference between ê and ē, and between ô and ō, found in classes 1 and 2, was a bit more robust, but also eventually waned in the development to modern Dutch. Consequently, the distinction was mostly lost. Class 3, which retained a clear distinction that did not rely on vowel length, was levelled in favour of the o of the plural.

In classes with a lengthened vowel in the present, the singular imperative often appears with a short vowel instead, e.g. les, drach. An alternative form, with final -e by analogy with the weak verbs, also occurs.

The eastern dialects occasionally show i in the second- and third-person singular present indicative forms, instead of e. This is a remnant of older i-mutation in these forms. Umlaut is also sometimes found in the past subjunctive in the east.

Infinitive	bliven	
Gerund	blivene	
Indicative mood
	Present	Past
1st sing.	blive	blêef
2nd sing.	blijfs, blives	blēefs, blēves
3rd sing.	blijft, blivet	blêef
1st plur.	bliven	blēven
2nd plur.	blijft, blivet	blēeft, blēvet
3rd plur.	bliven	blēven
Subjunctive mood
	Present	Past
1st sing.	blive	blēve
2nd sing.	blijfs, blives	blēefs, blēves
3rd sing.	blive	blēve
1st plur.	bliven	blēven
2nd plur.	blijft, blivet	blēeft, blēvet
3rd plur.	bliven	blēven
Imperative mood
Sing.	blijf, blive	
Plur.	blijft, blivet	
Participle
	blivende	geblēven

Infinitive	binden	
Gerund	bindene	
Indicative mood
	Present	Past
1st sing.	binde	bant
2nd sing.	bints, bindes	bonts, bondes
3rd sing.	bint, bindet	bant
1st plur.	binden	bonden
2nd plur.	bint, bindet	bont, bondet
3rd plur.	binden	bonden
Subjunctive mood
	Present	Past
1st sing.	binde	bonde
2nd sing.	bints, bindes	bonts, bondes
3rd sing.	binde	bonde
1st plur.	binden	bonden
2nd plur.	bint, bindet	bont, bondet
3rd plur.	binden	bonden
Imperative mood
Sing.	bint, binde	
Plur.	bint, bindet	
Participle
	bindende	gebonden

Infinitive	drāgen	
Gerund	drāgene	
Indicative mood
	Present	Past
1st sing.	drāge	droech
2nd sing.	drāechs, drāges	droechs, droeges
3rd sing.	drāecht, drāget	droech
1st plur.	drāgen	droegen
2nd plur.	drāecht, drāget	droecht, droeget
3rd plur.	drāgen	droegen
Subjunctive mood
	Present	Past
1st sing.	drāge	droege
2nd sing.	drāechs, drāges	droechs, droeges
3rd sing.	drāge	droege
1st plur.	drāgen	droegen
2nd plur.	drāecht, drāget	droecht, droeget
3rd plur.	drāgen	droegen
Imperative mood
Sing.	drach, drāge	
Plur.	drāecht, drāget	
Participle
	drāgende	gedrāgen

==== Weak verbs ====
Middle Dutch retained weak verbs as the only productive class of verbs. While Old Dutch still had two different classes of weak verbs (and remnants of a third), this distinction was lost in Middle Dutch with the weakening of unstressed syllables.

The past tense was formed with a suffix -ed-, which generally lost its e through syncope and thus came to be directly attached to the preceding stem. This triggered voicing assimilation, so that t appeared whenever the preceding stem ended in a voiceless consonant. This phenomenon remains in modern Dutch. Unsyncopated forms, which retain the fuller suffix -ed-, are sometimes found, especially with stems ending in a labial or velar consonant.

Some former class 1 weak verbs retained so-called Rückumlaut. These verbs had undergone umlaut in the present tense, but the umlaut-triggering vowel was syncopated in the past tense already in Old Dutch, preventing umlaut from taking hold there. Thus, senden had the first- and third-person singular past tense sande. These verbs tended to be reinterpreted as strong verbs in later Middle Dutch; sande itself gave rise to the modern zond, mirroring strong class 3.

Infinitive	māken	
Gerund	mākene	
Indicative mood
	Present	Past
1st sing.	māke	māecte
2nd sing.	māecs, mākes	māectes
3rd sing.	māect, māket	māecte
1st plur.	māken	māecten
2nd plur.	māect, māket	māectet
3rd plur.	māken	māecten
Subjunctive mood
	Present	Past
1st sing.	māke	māecte
2nd sing.	māecs, mākes	māectes
3rd sing.	māke	māecte
1st plur.	māken	māecten
2nd plur.	māect, māket	māectet
3rd plur.	māken	māecten
Imperative mood
Sing.	māke	
Plur.	māect, māket	
Participle
	mākende	gemāect, gemāket

Infinitive	senden	
Gerund	sendene	
Indicative mood
	Present	Past
1st sing.	sende	sende, sande
2nd sing.	sents, sendes	sendes, sandes
3rd sing.	sent, sendet	sende, sande
1st plur.	senden	senden, sanden
2nd plur.	sent, sendet	sendet, sandet
3rd plur.	senden	senden, sanden
Subjunctive mood
	Present	Past
1st sing.	sende	sende
2nd sing.	sents, sendes	sendes
3rd sing.	sende	sende
1st plur.	senden	senden
2nd plur.	sent, sendet	sendet
3rd plur.	senden	senden
Imperative mood
Sing.	sende	
Plur.	sent, sendet	
Participle
	sendende	gesent, gesendet, gesant
