= Jean Froissart =

French writer and historian (c. 1337–c. 1405)

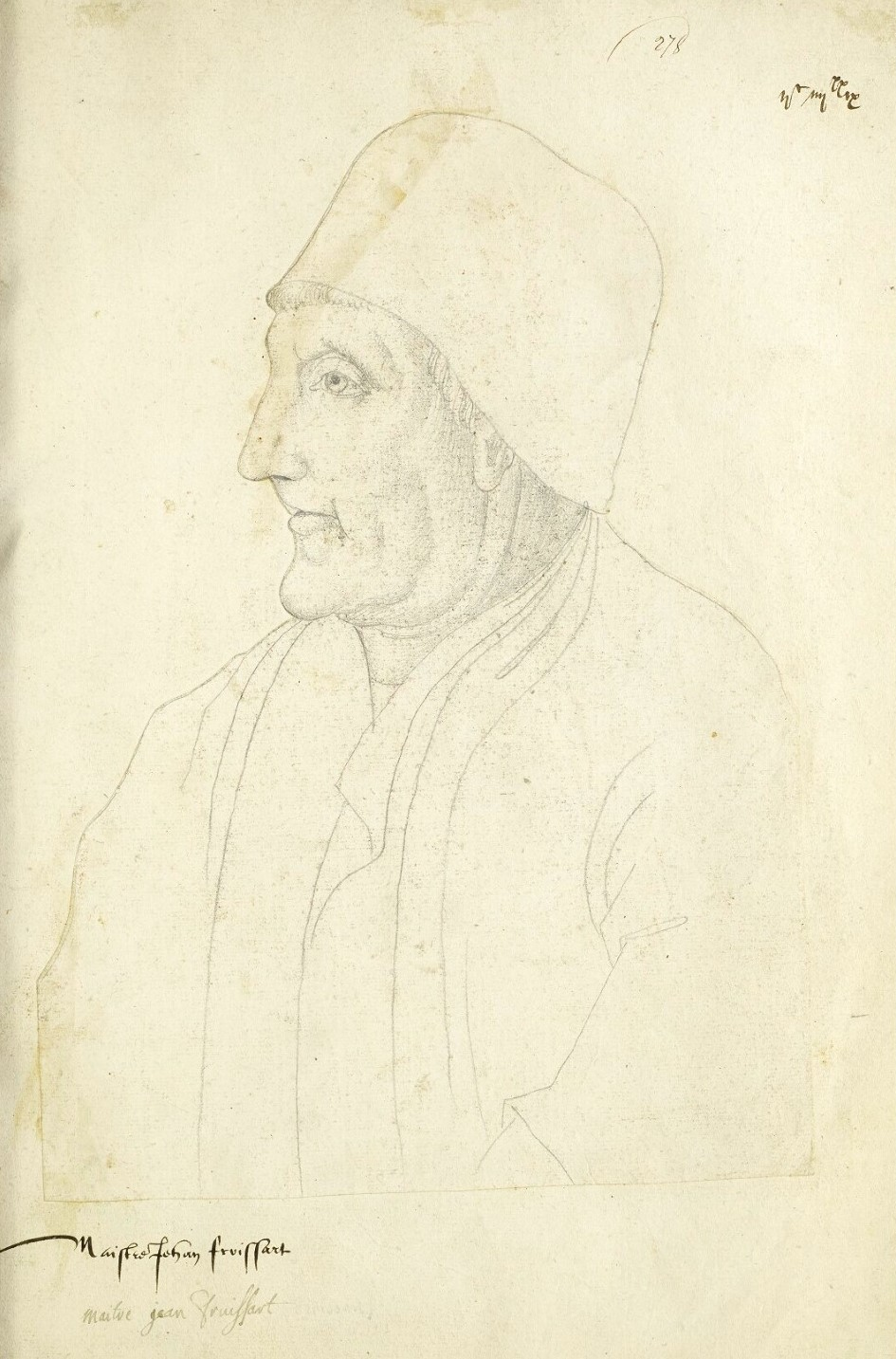
- Posthumous portrait in the Recueil d'Arras (16th century)
- Born: c. 1337; Valenciennes, County of Hainaut, Holy Roman Empire
- Died: c. 1405 (aged 67–68); Chimay, Hainaut
- Occupations: Historian and poet
- Works: Froissart's Chronicles

Jean Froissart (Old and Middle French: Jehan; sometimes known as John Froissart in English; c. 1337 – c. 1405) was a French-speaking medieval author and court historian from the Low Countries who wrote several works, including Chronicles and Meliador, a long Arthurian romance, and a large body of poetry, both short lyrical forms as well as longer narrative poems. For centuries, Froissart's Chronicles have been recognised as the chief expression of the chivalric revival of the 14th-century kingdoms of England, France and Scotland. His history is also an important source for the first half of the Hundred Years' War.

== Life ==
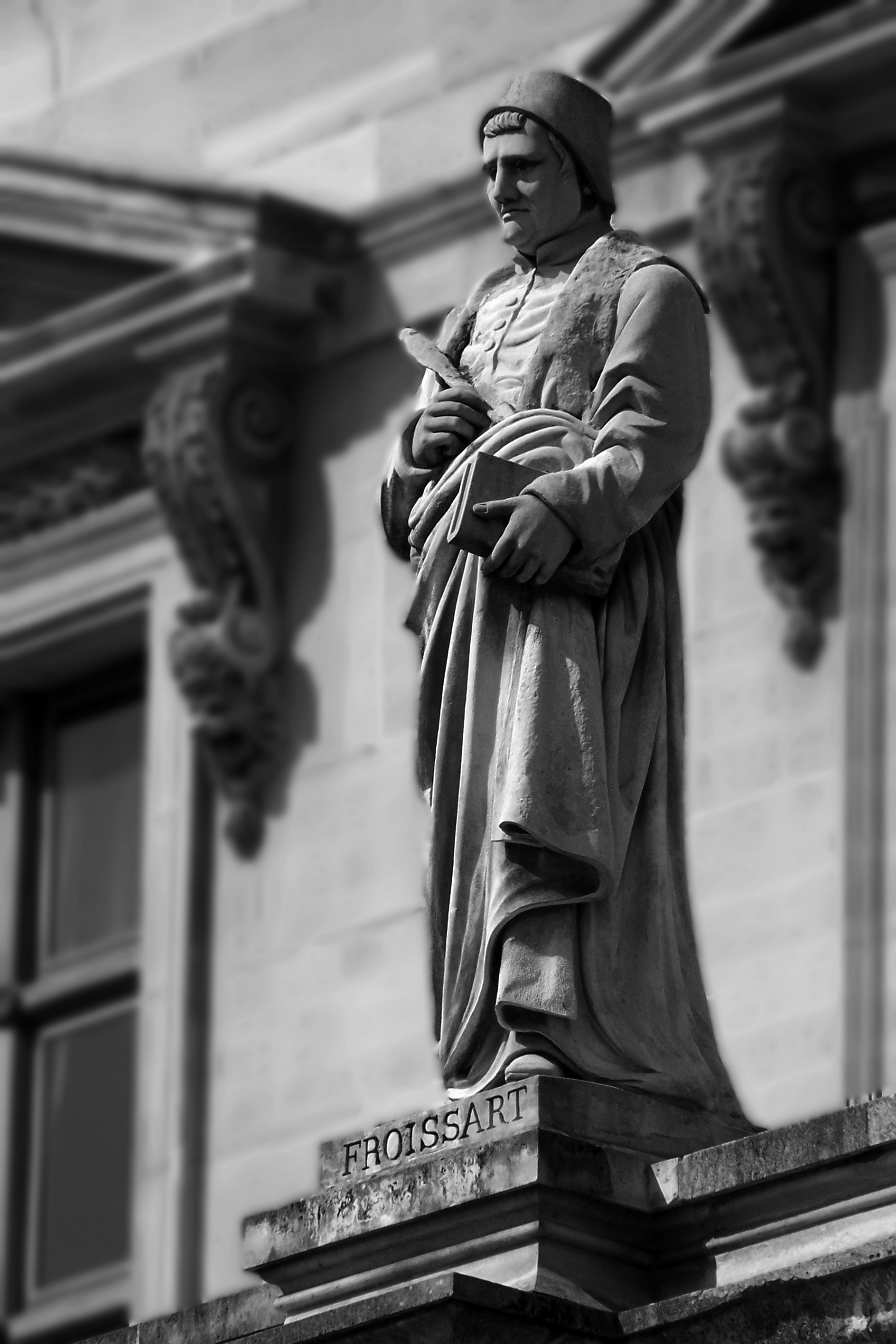
Froissart's statue in the Louvre

What little is known of Froissart's life comes mainly from his historical writings and from archival sources which mention him in the service of aristocrats or receiving gifts from them. Although his poems have also been used in the past to reconstruct aspects of his biography, this approach is said to be flawed, as the 'I' persona which appears in many of the poems should not be construed as a reliable reference to the historical author. This is why de Looze has characterised these works as 'pseudo-autobiographical'.

Froissart came from Valenciennes in the County of Hainaut, situated in the western tip of the Holy Roman Empire, bordering France. Earlier scholars have suggested that his father was a painter of armorial bearings, but there is actually little evidence for this. Other suggestions include that he began working as a merchant but soon gave that up to become a cleric. For this conclusion there is also questionable evidence, as the poems which have been cited to support these interpretations are not widely considered to be autobiographical.

By about age 24, Froissart left Hainault and entered the service of Philippa of Hainault, queen consort of Edward III of England, in 1361 or 1362. This service, which would have lasted until the queen's death in 1369, has often been presented as including a position of court poet and/or official historiographer. Based on surviving archives of the English court, Croenen has concluded instead that this service did not entail an official position at court, and probably was more a literary construction, in which a courtly poet dedicated poems to his 'lady' and in return received occasional gifts as remuneration.

Froissart took a serious approach to his work. He traveled in England, Scotland, Wales, France, Flanders and Spain gathering material and first-hand accounts for his Chronicles. He traveled with Lionel, Duke of Clarence, to Milan to attend and chronicle the duke's wedding to Violante, the daughter of Galeazzo Visconti. At this wedding, two other significant writers of the Middle Ages were present, Chaucer and Petrarch.

After the death of Queen Philippa, he enjoyed the patronage of Joanna, Duchess of Brabant among various others. He received rewards – including the benefice of Estinnes, a village near Binche, and later a canonry of Chimay – sufficient to finance further travels, which provided additional material for his work. He returned to England in 1395 but seemed disappointed by changes that he viewed as the end of chivalry. The date and circumstances of his death are unknown but St. Monegunda of Chimay in Hainaut might be the final resting place for his remains, although still unverified.

== Legacy ==
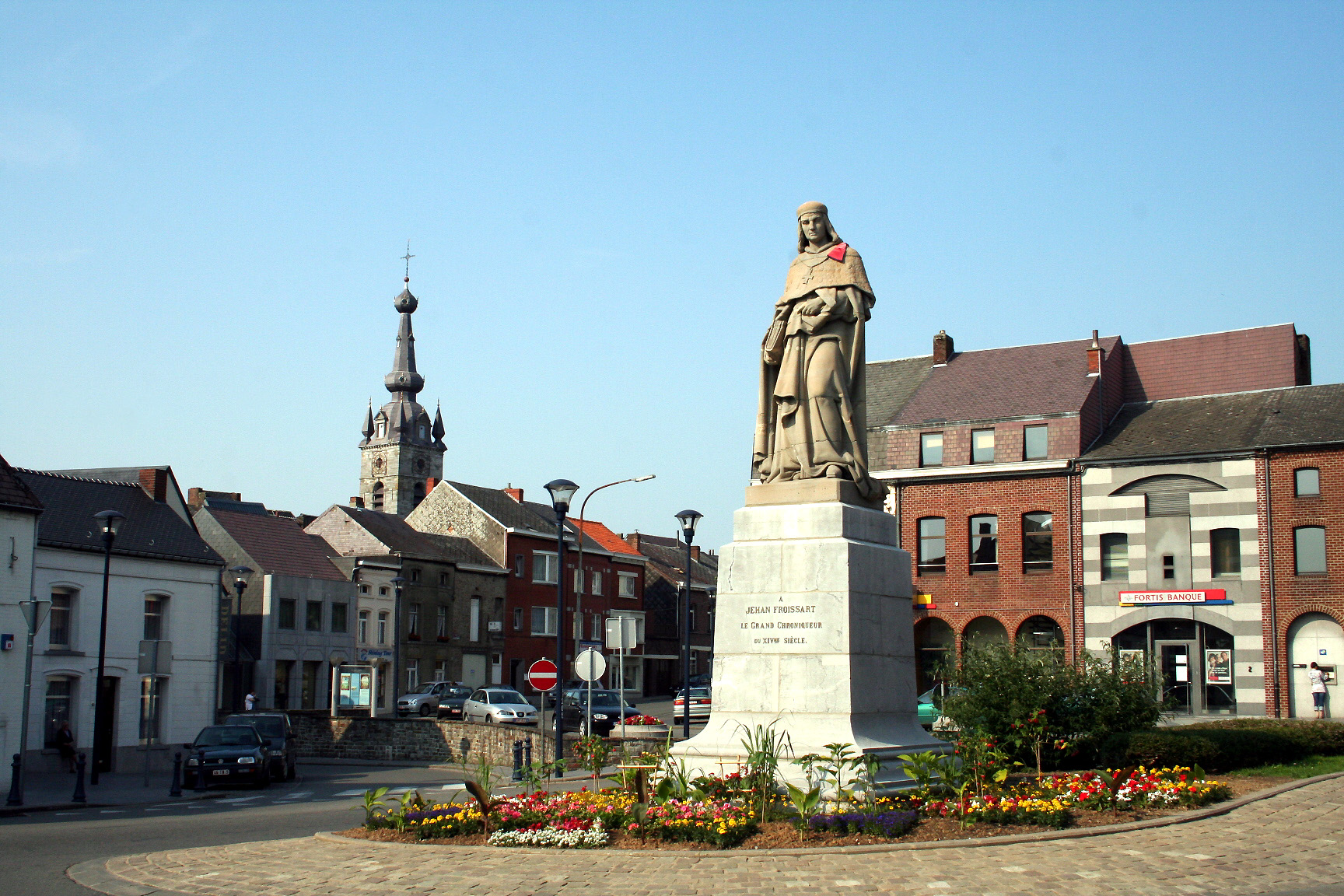
Statue of Froissart in Chimay, Belgium

Much more than his poetry, Froissart's fame is due to his Chronicles. The text of his Chronicles is preserved in more than 100 illuminated manuscripts, illustrated by a variety of miniaturists. One of the most lavishly illuminated copies was commissioned by Louis de Gruuthuse, a Flemish nobleman, in the 1470s. The four volumes of this copy (BNF, Fr 2643; BNF, Fr 2644; BNF, Fr 2645; BNF, Fr 2646) contain 112 miniatures painted by well-known Brugeois artists of the day, among them Loiset Lyédet, to whom the miniatures in the first two volumes are attributed. Froissart is thought to have been one of the first to mention the use of the verge and foliot, or verge escapement in European clockworks, by 1368.

The English composer Edward Elgar wrote an overture titled Froissart, inspired by the Chronicles.

== Works ==
- Chronicles
- L'Horloge amoureux
- Méliador

== Bibliography ==
- Peter Ainsworth, "Froissart, Jean", in Graeme Dunphy, Encyclopedia of the Medieval Chronicle, Leiden, Brill, 2010, pp. 642–645 (ISBN 90-04-18464-3).
- Peter F. Ainsworth, Jean Froissart and the Fabric of History: Truth, Myth, and Fiction in the Chroniques, Oxford: Clarendon Press, 1990. (ISBN 978-0-198-15864-6).
- Walter Besant (1911). "Froissart, Jean" . In Chisholm, Hugh (ed.). Encyclopædia Britannica. Vol. 11 (11th ed.). Cambridge University Press. pp. 242–246.. This contains a lengthy discussion of Froissart's life and works as understood at the time, and may contain material that could be added to this article.
- Cristian Bratu, « Je, auteur de ce livre »: L’affirmation de soi chez les historiens, de l’Antiquité à la fin du Moyen Âge. Later Medieval Europe Series (vol. 20). Leiden: Brill, 2019 (ISBN 978-90-04-39807-8).
- Cristian Bratu, "Je, aucteur de ce livre: Authorial Persona and Authority in French Medieval Histories and Chronicles." In Authorities in the Middle Ages. Influence, Legitimacy and Power in Medieval Society. Sini Kangas, Mia Korpiola, and Tuija Ainonen, eds. (Berlin/New York: De Gruyter, 2013): 183–204.
- Cristian Bratu, "De la grande Histoire à l’histoire personnelle: l’émergence de l’écriture autobiographique chez les historiens français du Moyen Age (XIIIe-XVe siècles)." Mediävistik 25 (2012): 85-117.
- Donald Maddox & Sara Sturm-Maddox (eds.), Froissart Across the Genres, University of Florida Press, 1998. (ISBN 978-0-813-01619-1).
- F. S. Shears, Froissart: Chronicler and Poet, London: George Routledge & Sons, 1930.
- Robert Metcalf Smith, Froissart and the English Chronicle Play, Columbia University Press, 1915. (reprinted 1965).
- Jones, Michael (2004). "Froissart, Jean (1337?–c. 1404), historian and poet". Oxford Dictionary of National Biography (online) (online ed.). Oxford University Press. doi:10.1093/ref:odnb/50195. (Subscription, Wikipedia Library access or UK public library membership required.)
