= Recueil d'Arras =

16th-century manuscript

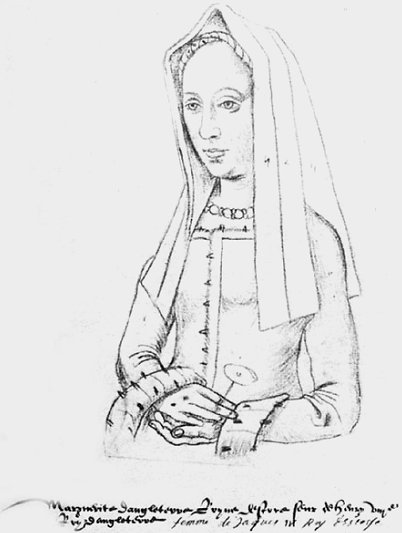
Margaret Tudor

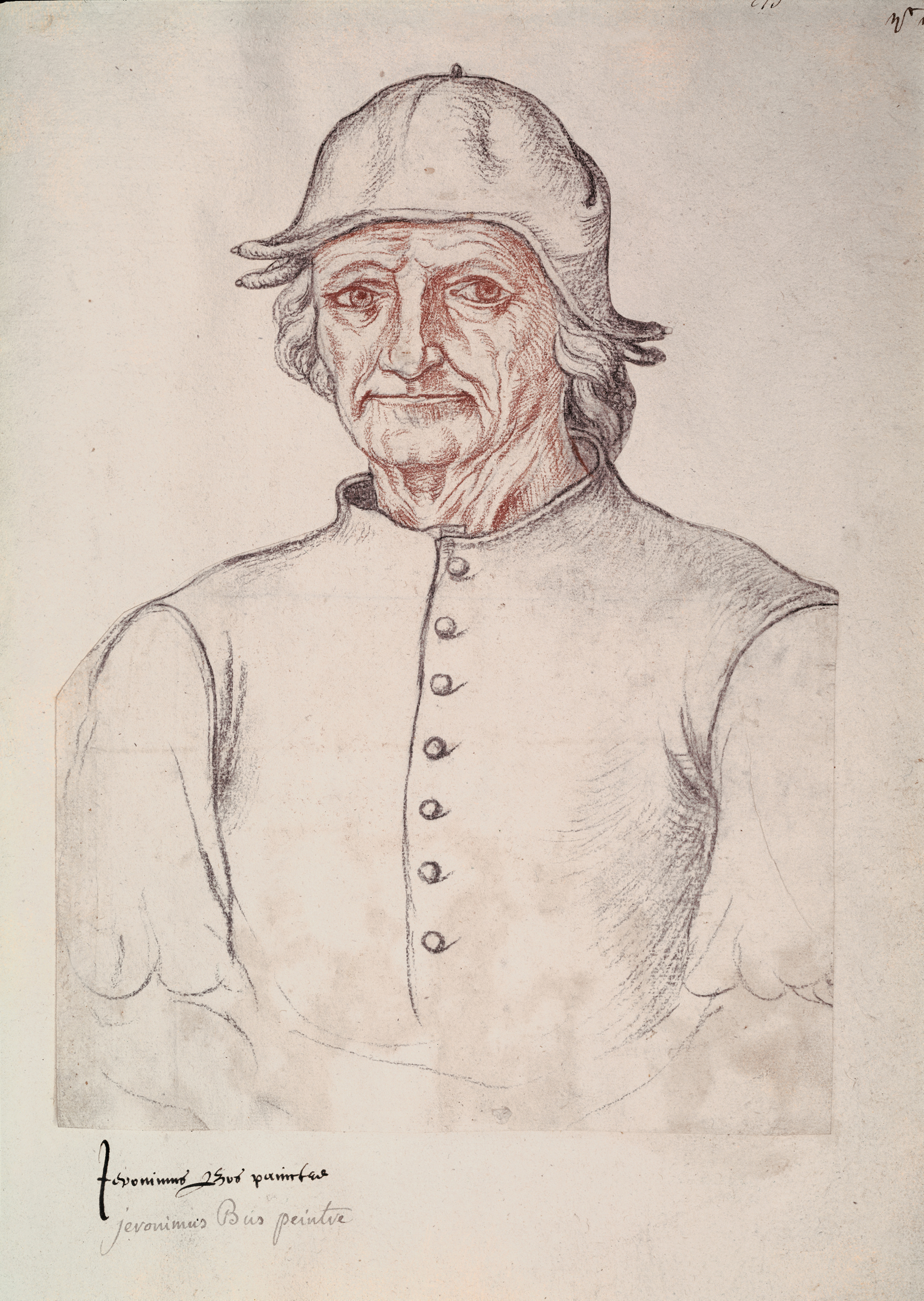
Hieronymus Bosch

The Recueil d'Arras is a mid-16th century manuscript. Tentatively attributed to the Netherlandish artist Jacques Le Boucq, the recueil (miscellany) comprises 293 paper folios, of which 289 (numbers 5–177, 179–293, and 271) contain copies of portraits of named historical people. The book is named after the city of its current location, Arras in Northern France. It is not known who commissioned the book, or for what purpose; but it is of significant historical interest, as it reproduces many near-contemporary depictions of known political, courtly, or artistic persons.

== Portraits ==
The drawings are arranged by family or region, beginning with members of the English, Scottish and French royal families, the Hainault family and court, the Blois, the dukes and duchesses of Burgundy and the court of the Spanish Netherlands. The portraits are followed by a series of warriors, ecclesiastics, writers and finally notable heretics.

The portraits include a self-portrait by Hieronymus Bosch and a double portrait of Philip the Good and Charles the Bold, a copy of Jan van Eyck's Portrait of Baudouin de Lannoy and depictions of Margaret of York and Jacqueline, Countess of Hainaut, all of whom are named in the index contained in folios 1–4, a later addition probably based on notes Le Boucq made on the margins which have since been cut away. The only non-historical portraits are of (the unidentified) Laure de Noves and Petrarch on folio 27I verso. The drawings are all in black or red chalk on paper. Nine are lost, while only torn fragments remain of a small number of others. It was originally foliated using Roman numerals; this was changed to Arabic numerals by a later scribe.

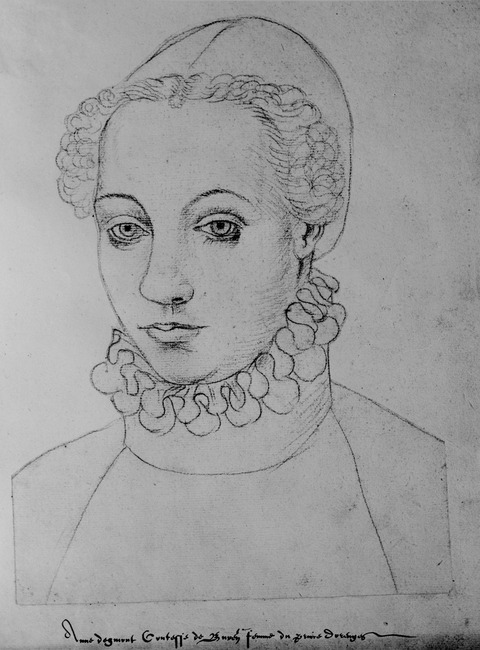
Anna van Egmont

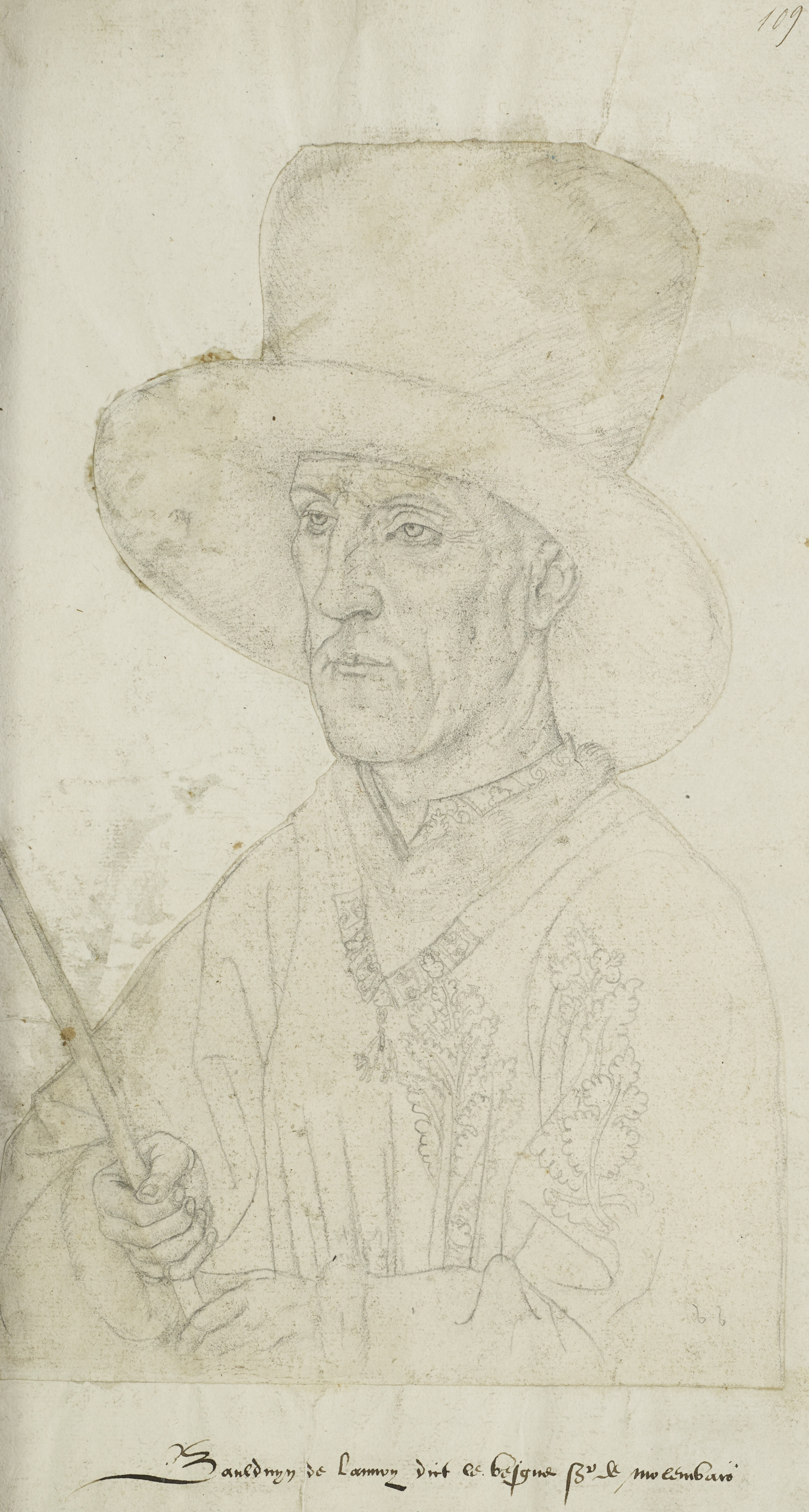
Baldwin of Lannoy

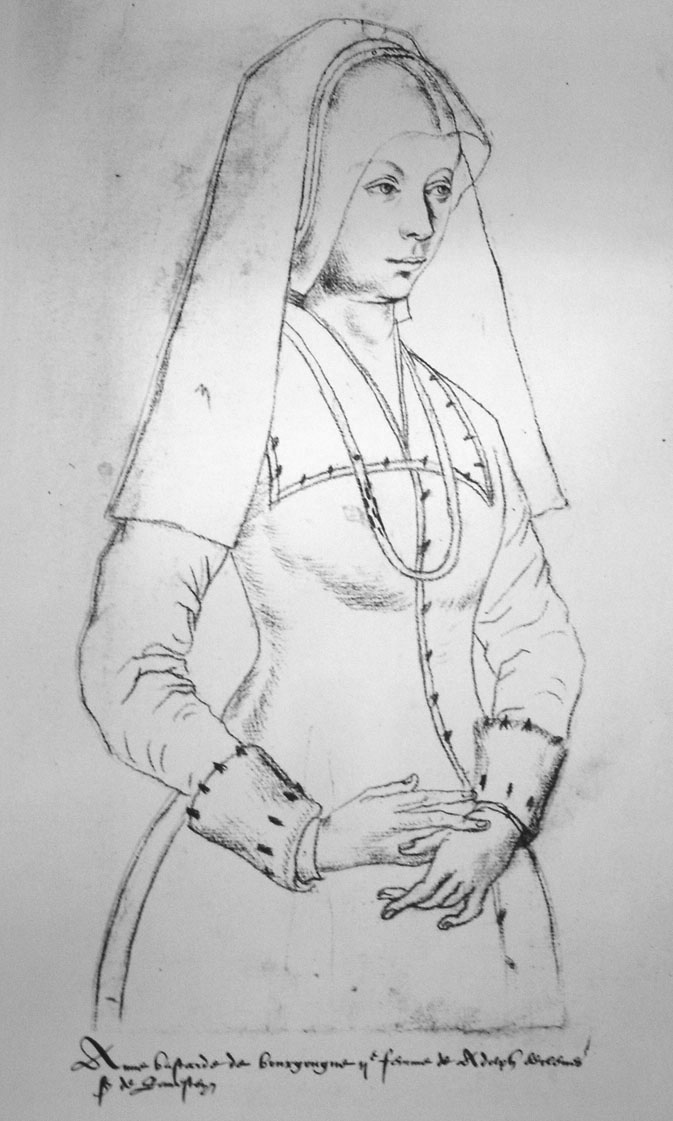
Anna van Bourgondië

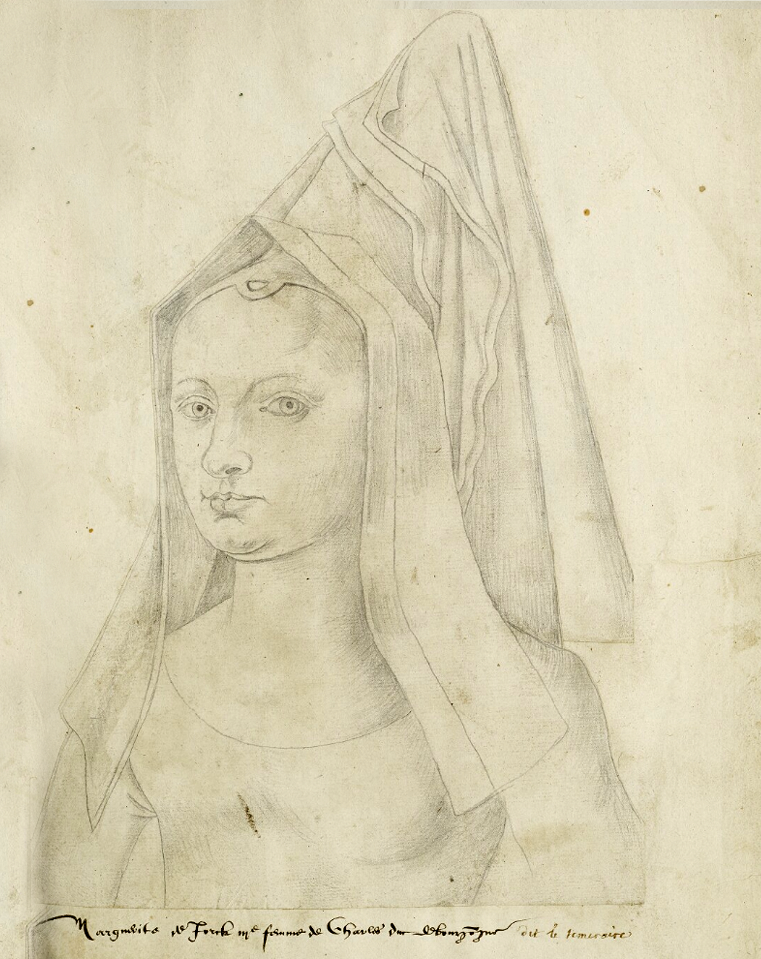
Margaret of York

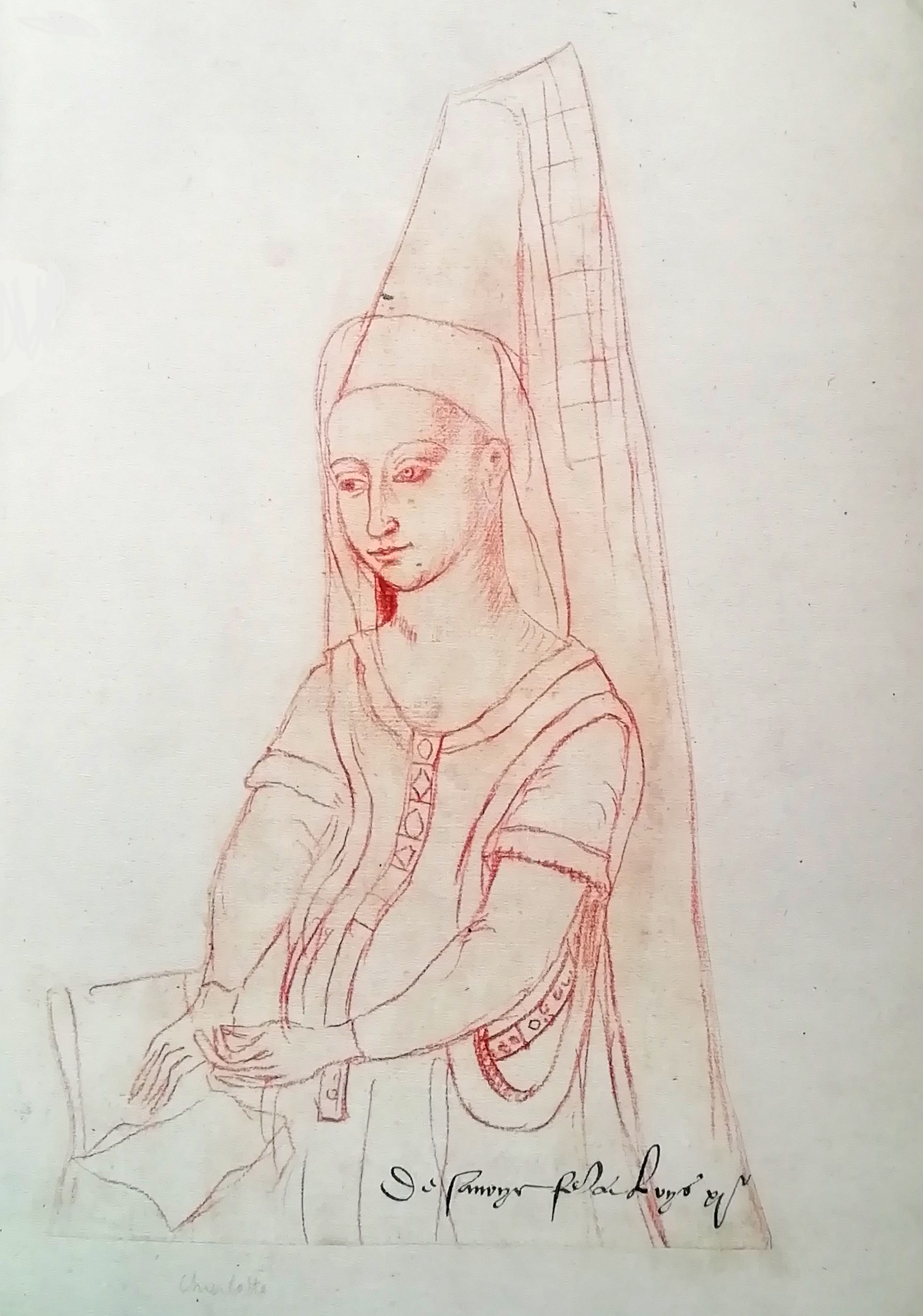
Margaret Stewart, Dauphine of France

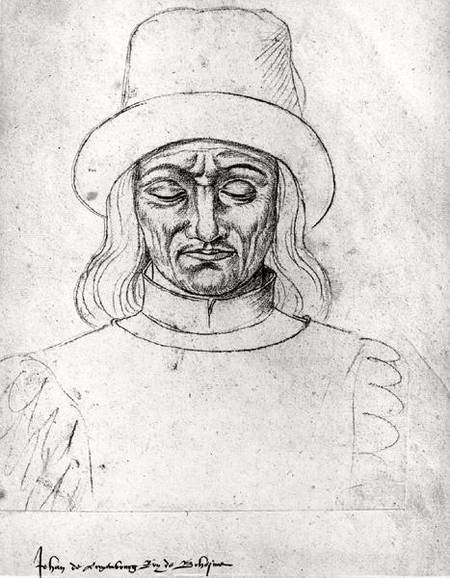
Jean de Luxembourg

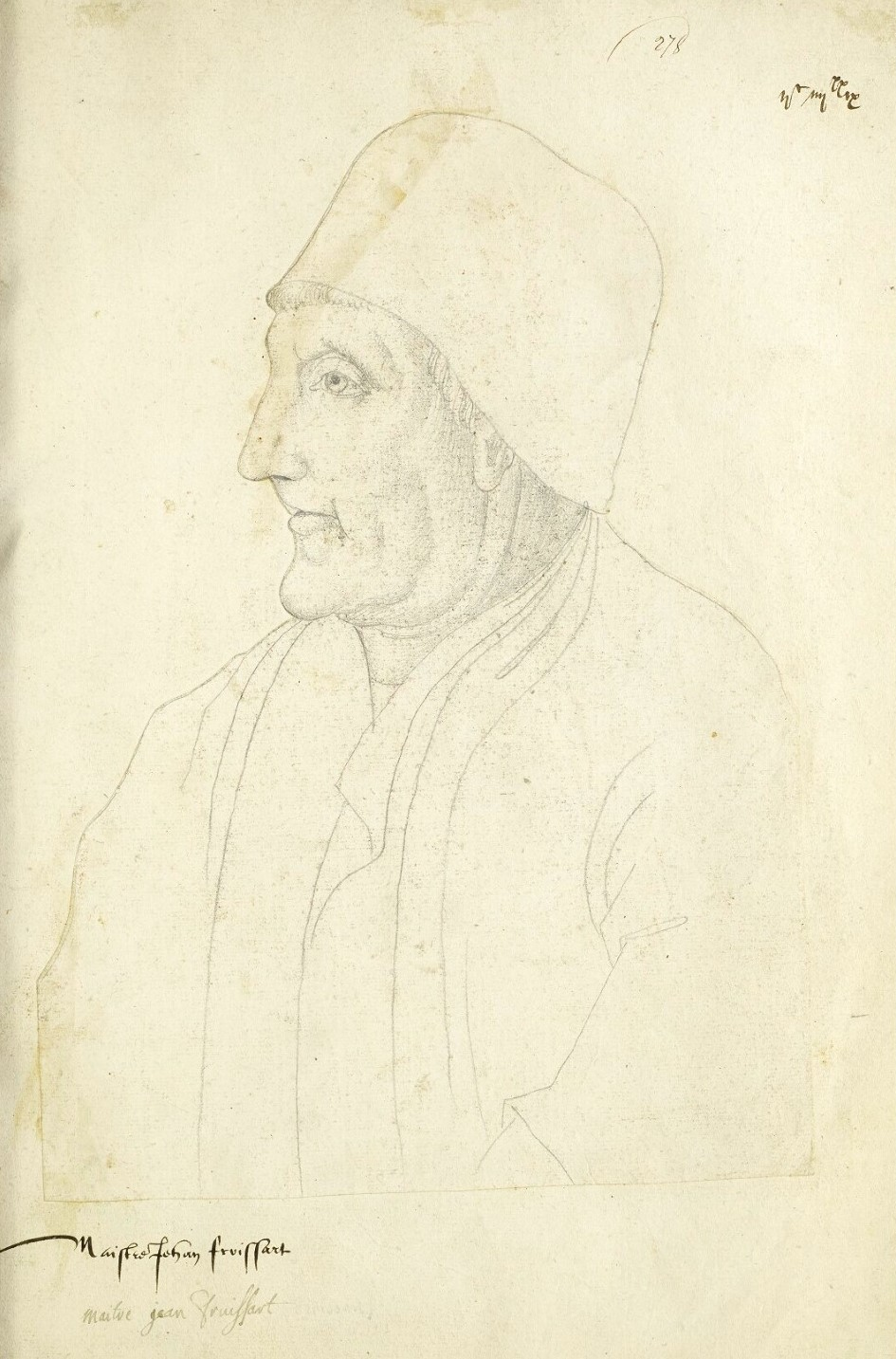
Jean Froissart

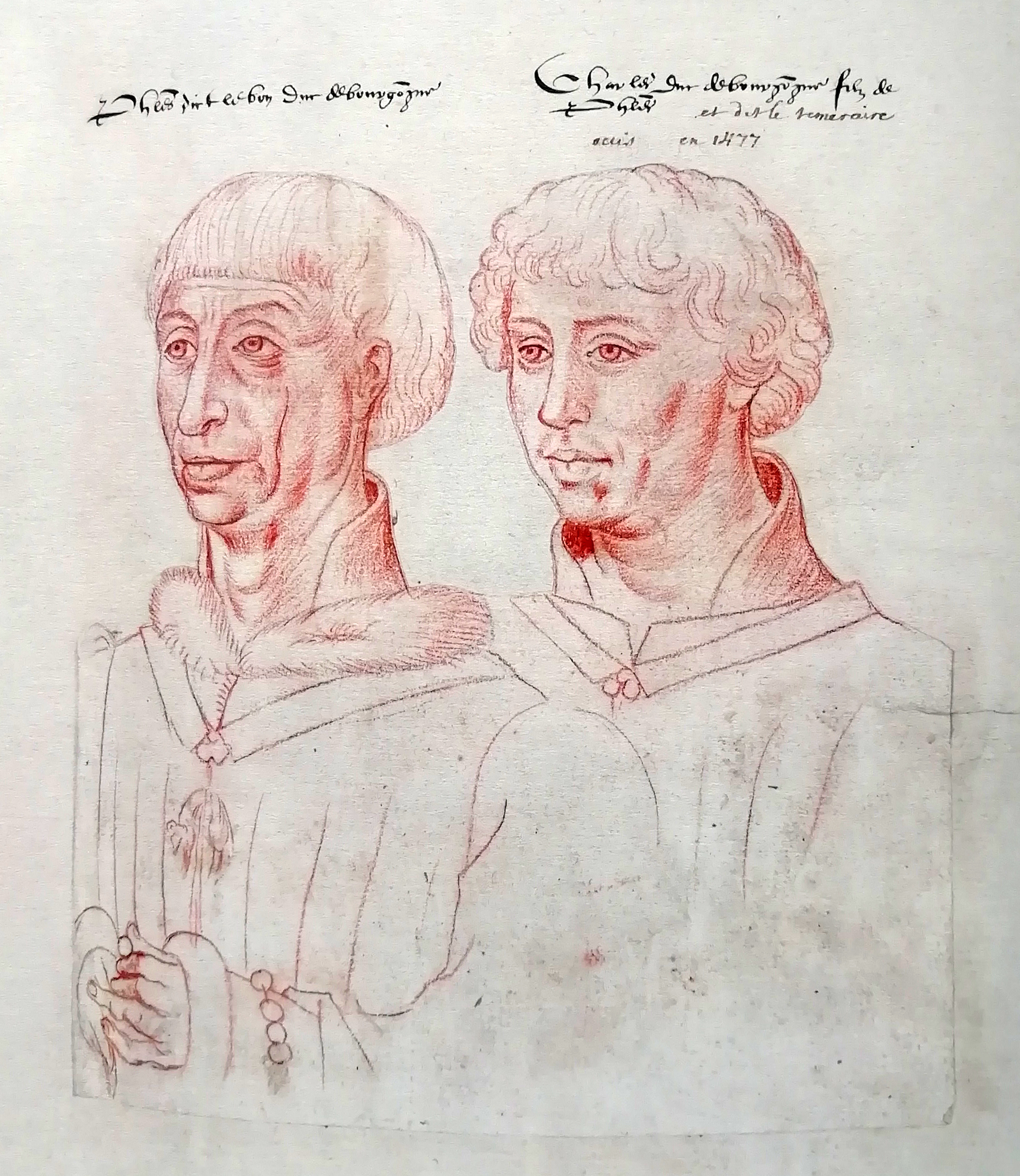
Philip the Good and Charles the Bold, f303

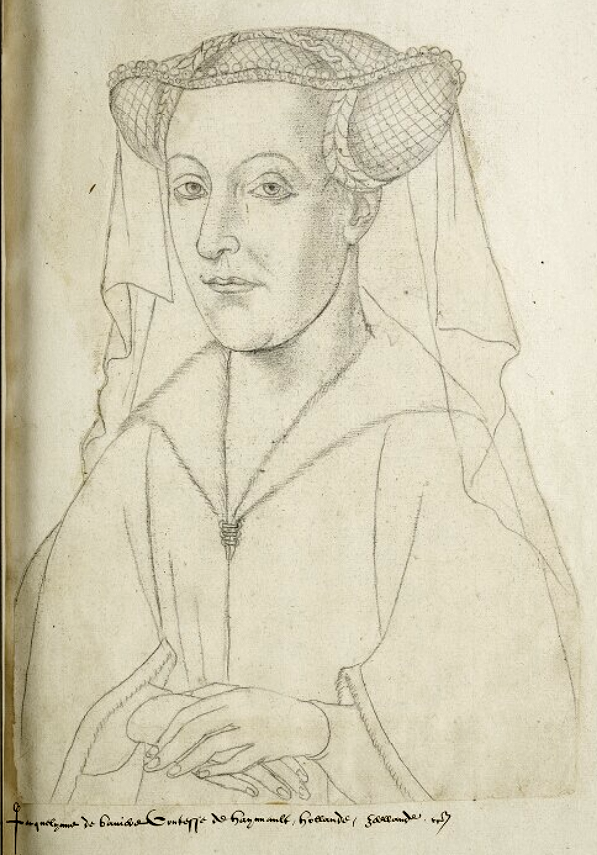
Jacqueline, Countess of Hainaut

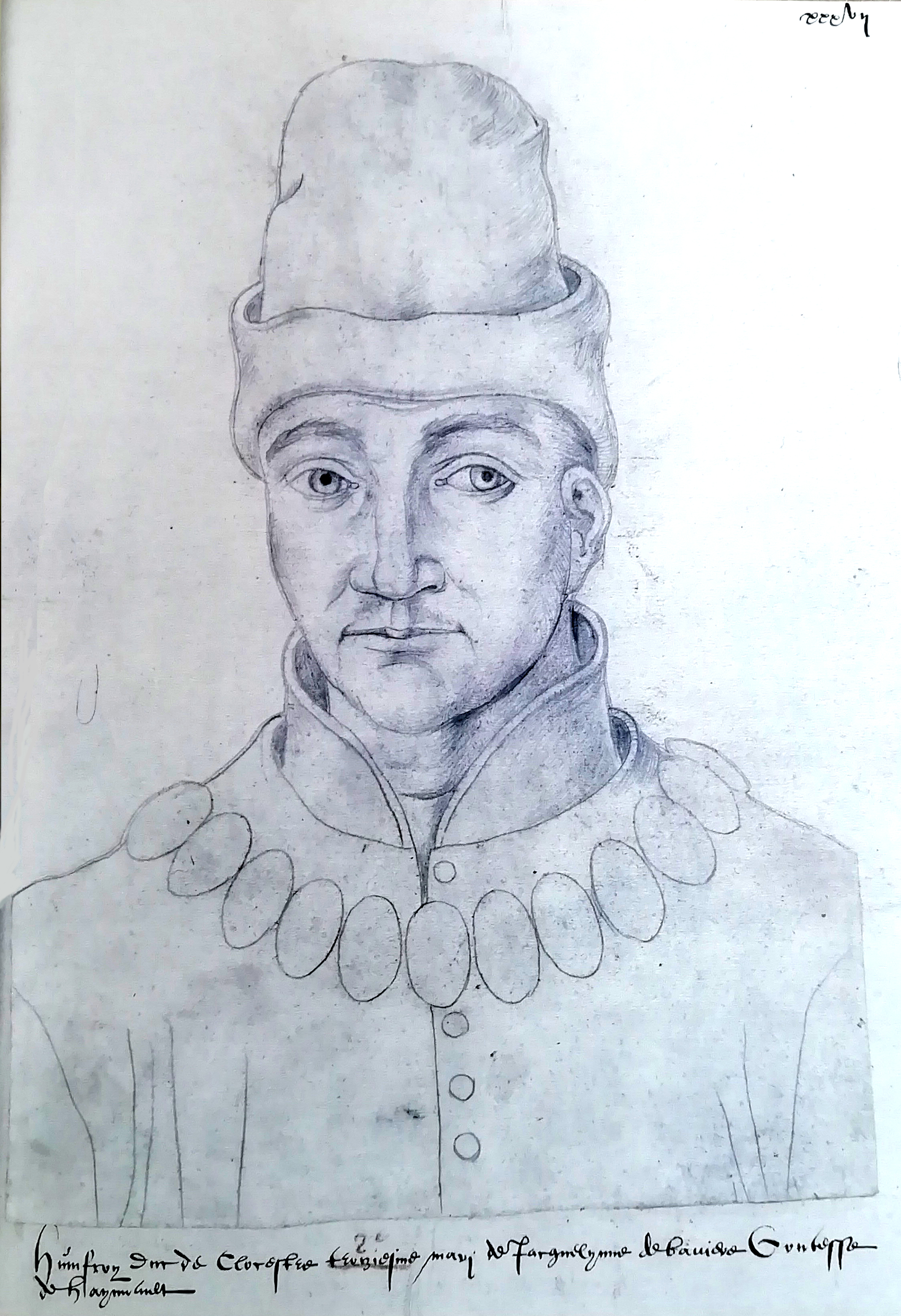
Humphrey, Duke of Gloucester

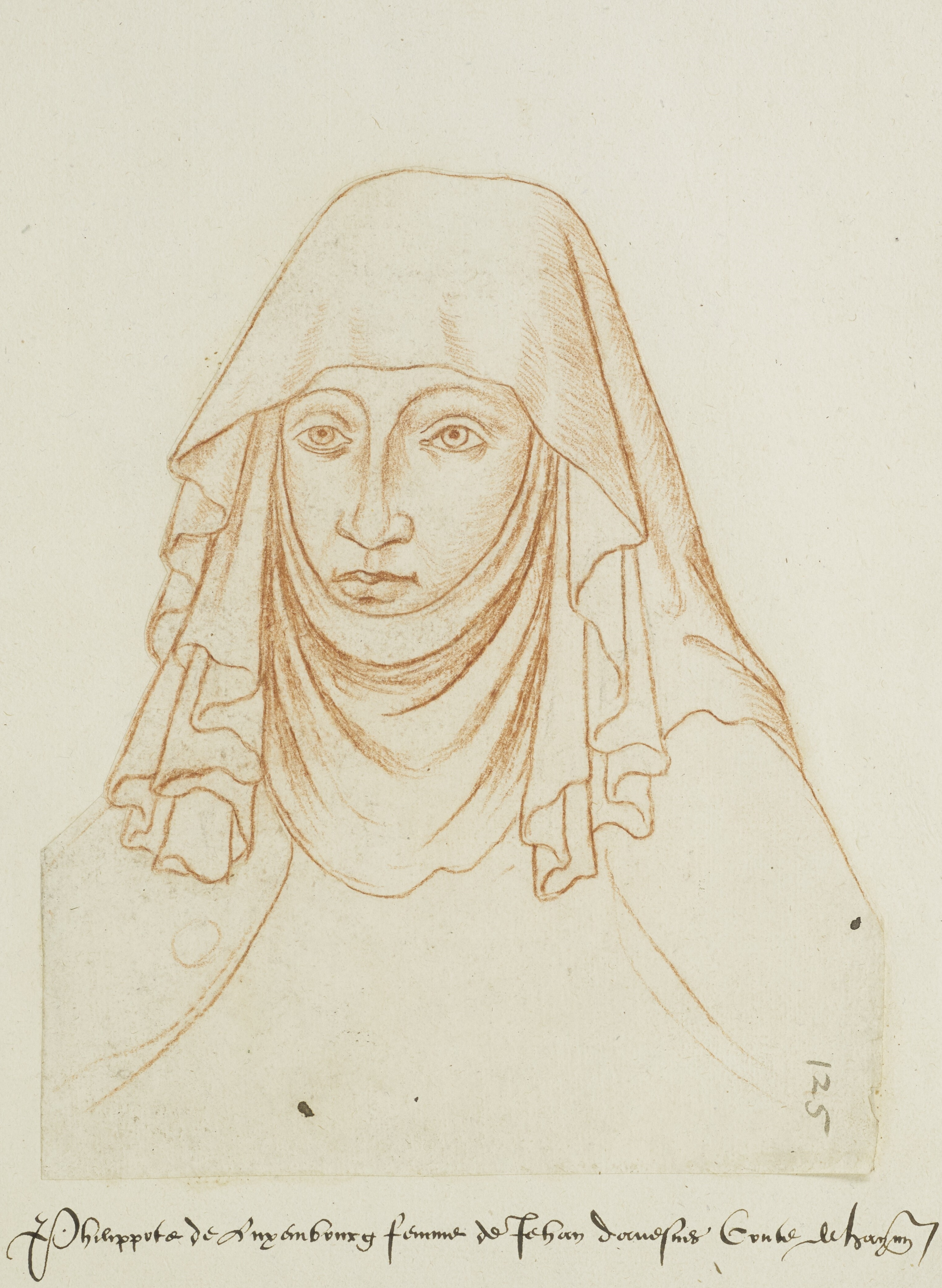
Philippa of Luxembourg

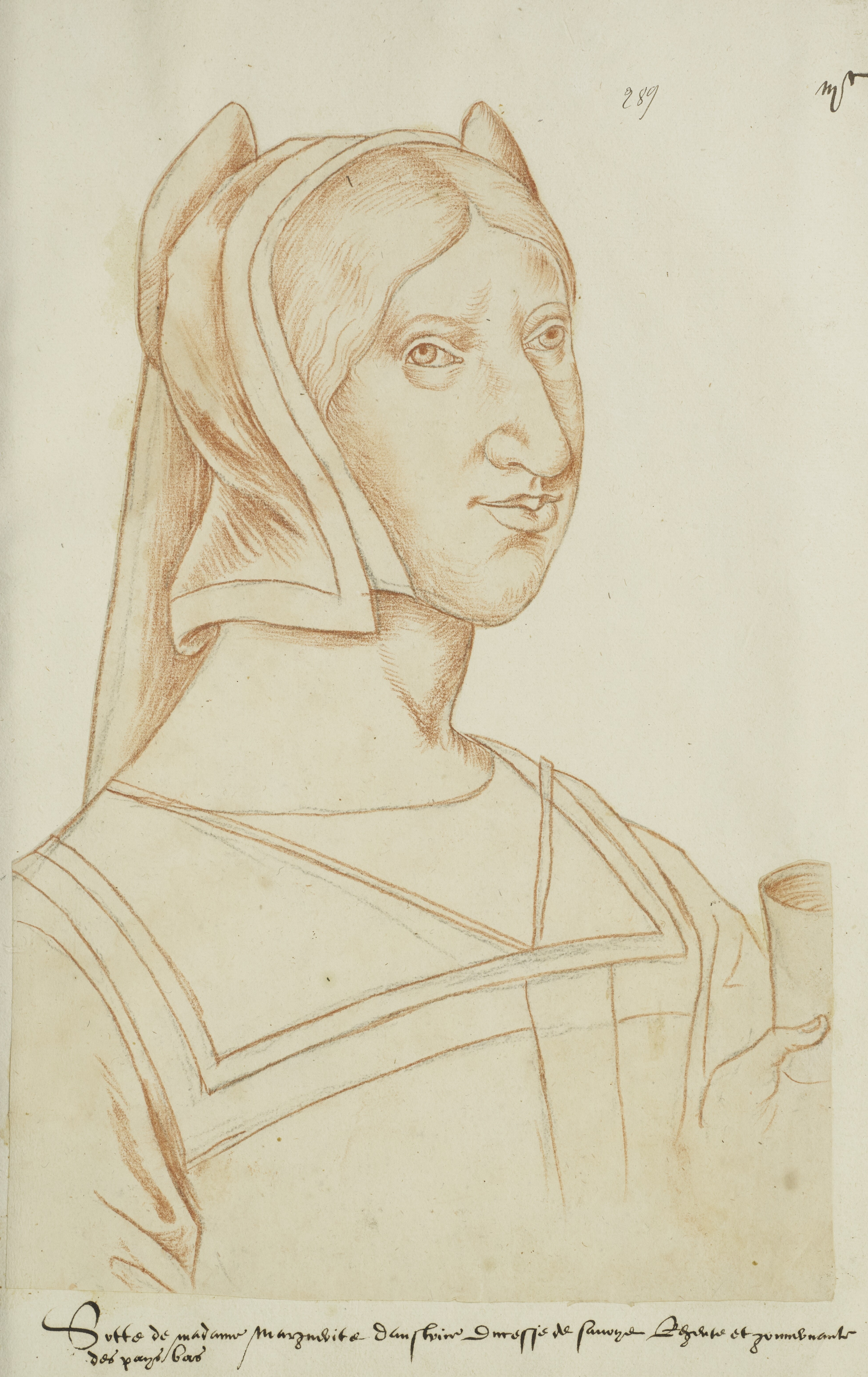
Fool of Margaret of Austria, Duchess of Savoy
