= County of Dunois =

Area surrounding Châteaudun in central France

A map of France in 1477 showing Dunois (in centre, blue)

The County of Dunois comprised the old pagus Dunensis, the area surrounding Châteaudun in central France. A county had taken form around Châteaudun (Castrum Dunense) in the tenth century. It passed to the counts of Blois, who appointed viscounts to administer it. It was re-created as the county of Dunois in 1439, and bestowed on John, an illegitimate son of the Duke of Orléans (who was also count of Blois). It remained a fief of the House of Orléans-Longueville founded by him until its extinction in 1707. It was later inherited by Louise-Léontine de Bourbon-Soissons, a granddaughter of Louis, Count of Soissons, wife of Charles Philippe d'Albert, 4th Duke of Luynes
