= List of countesses and duchesses of Orléans =

The list of countesses and duchesses of Orléans comprises the wives of the monarchs of Orléans in northern France until the abolition of the Duchy of Orléans in the 19th century.

== Countess of Orléans ==
=== Merovingian countesses ===
- NN, wife of Count Willachar and the mother Chalde of Orléans, wife of Chramn son of King Chlothar I.

=== Carolingian countesses ===
| Picture | Name | Father | Birth | Marriage | Became Countess | Ceased to be Countess | Death | Spouse |
|---|---|---|---|---|---|---|---|---|
| | Waldrada de Wormsgau | Erphold ? (Nibelungid or Widonid) | - | - | - | 821 husband's death | 824 | Adrian |
There are no mentions of Matfrid, Count of Orléans, having a wife or if he did what her name was.
| | Engeltrude de Fézensac | Leuthard I, Count of Paris and Fézensac (Girardid) | 805 | 825 | 827 husband's ascension | 834 husband's death | 853 | Odo I |
| | Richilde of Vermandois | Pepin, Count of Vermandois | - | - | - | - | - | William |
| | Agane | - | - | - | - | before 862 | | Robert |
| | Adelaide of Tours | Hugh, Count of Tours (Etichonid) | 805 | after 862 | | 15 September 866 husband's death | 886 | Robert |
| | Théodrate of Troyes | Aleran, Count of Troyes | 868 | 881/before 885 | | 29 February 888 became Queen consort | 903 | Odo II |
| | Judith | - | - | 922 | | 925 | | Hugh I |
| | Eadhild of England | Edward the Elder, King of the Anglo-Saxons (Wessex) | 907/910 | 926/7 | | 26 January 937 | | Hugh I |
| | Hedwige of Saxony | Henry I the Fowler, King of the East Franks (Liudolfings) | 910/22 | 14 September 938 | | 16 June 956 husband's death | 10 May 965 | Hugh I |
| | Adelaide of Aquitaine | William III, Duke of Aquitaine (Ramnulfids) | 945 | 970 | | 3 July 987 became Queen consort | 15 June 1004/06 | Hugh II |

=== Capetian countesses ===
| Picture | Name | Father | Birth | Marriage | Became Countess | Ceased to be Countess | Death | Spouse |
|---|---|---|---|---|---|---|---|---|
| | Isabella of Aragon | James I of Aragon (Barcelona) | 1247 | 28 May 1262 | | 25 August 1270 became Queen | 28 January 1271 | Philip of France |

== Duchess of Orléans ==
=== House of Valois ===
==== First creation ====
| Picture | Name | Father | Birth | Marriage | Became Duchess | Ceased to be Duchess | Death | Spouse |
|---|---|---|---|---|---|---|---|---|
| | Blanche of France | Charles IV of France (Capet) | 1 April 1328 | 8 January 1345 | | 1 September 1376 husband's death | 8 February 1393 | Philippe of Valois |

==== Second creation ====
| Picture | Name | Father | Birth | Marriage | Became Duchess | Ceased to be Duchess | Death | Spouse |
|---|---|---|---|---|---|---|---|---|
| | Valentina Visconti | Giangaleazzo Visconti, Duke of Milan (Visconti) | 1366 | 17 August 1389 | | 23 November 1407 husband's death | 4 December 1408 | Louis I |
| | Isabella of Valois | Charles VI of France (Valois) | 9 November 1389 | 29 June 1406 | 23 November 1407 husband's accession | 13 September 1409 | | Charles I |
| | Bonne d'Armagnac | Bernard VII, Count of Armagnac (Armagnac) | 19 February 1392 | 15 August 1410 | | 1430/5 | | Charles I |
| | Marie de Clèves | Adolph I, Duke of Cleves (De la Marck) | 19 September 1426 | 27 November 1440 | | 5 January 1465 husband's death | 23 August 1487 | Charles I |
| | Joan of France, Duchess of Berry | Louis XI of France (Valois) | 23 April 1461 | 8 September 1476 | | 7 April 1498 became Queen consort | 4 February 1505 | Louis II |

==== Third creation ====
| Picture | Name | Father | Birth | Marriage | Became Duchess | Ceased to be Duchess | Death | Spouse |
|---|---|---|---|---|---|---|---|---|
| | Catherine de' Medici | Lorenzo de' Medici, Duke of Urbino (Medici) | 13 April 1519 | 28 October 1533 | | 10 August 1536 title passed to brother-in-law | 5 January 1589 | Henri I |

=== House of Bourbon ===
==== Fourth creation ====
None

==== Fifth creation ====
| Picture | Name | Father | Birth | Marriage | Became Duchess | Ceased to be Duchess | Death | Spouse |
|---|---|---|---|---|---|---|---|---|
| | Marie de Bourbon, Mademoiselle de Montpensier; Duchess of Montpensier | Henri de Bourbon, Duke of Montpensier (Bourbon-Montpensier) | 15 October 1605 | 6 August 1626 | | 4 June 1627 | | Gaston |
| | Marguerite of Lorraine | Francis II, Duke of Lorraine (Lorraine) | 22 July 1615 | 2 to 3 January 1632 | | 2 February 1660 husband's death | 13 April 1672 | Gaston |

=== House of Orléans ===
==== Sixth creation ====
| Picture | Name | Father | Birth | Marriage | Became Duchess | Ceased to be Duchess | Death | Spouse |
|---|---|---|---|---|---|---|---|---|
| | Princess Henrietta of England and Scotland | Charles I of England and Scotland (Stuart) | 26 June 1644 | 31 March 1661 | | 30 June 1670 | | Philippe de France |
| | Elizabeth Charlotte, Madame Palatine (Note: Born Elizabeth Charlotte, Countess Palatine of Simmern) | Charles I Louis, Elector Palatine (Palatinate-Simmern) | 27 May 1652 | 16 November 1671 | | 9 June 1701 husband's death | 9 December 1722 | Philippe de France |
| | Françoise Marie de Bourbon, Légitimée de France; Mademoiselle de Blois (Note: Known as "la seconde Mademoiselle de Blois" or "the second Mademoiselle de Blois", the style having been held by her half sister Marie Anne de Bourbon) | Louis XIV of France (Bourbon (Illegitimate)) | 25 May 1677 | 18 February 1692 | 9 June 1701 husband's accession | 2 December 1723 husband's death | 1 February 1749 | Philippe d'Orléans |
| | Margravine Johanna of Baden-Baden | Louis William, Margrave of Baden-Baden (Zähringen) | 10 November 1704 | 13 July 1724 | | 8 July 1726 | | Louis d'Orléans |
| | Louise Henriette de Bourbon, Mademoiselle de Conti; Duchess of Étampes | Louis Armand de Bourbon, Prince of Conti (Bourbon) | 20 June 1726 | 17 December 1743 | 4 February 1752 husband's accession | 9 February 1759 | | Louis Philippe d'Orléans |
| | Louise Marie Adélaïde de Bourbon; Mademoiselle de Penthièvre | Louis Jean Marie de Bourbon, Duke of Penthièvre (Bourbon) | 13 March 1753 | 8 May 1768 | 18 November 1785 husband's accession | 6 November 1793 husband's execution | 23 June 1821 | Louis Philippe Joseph d'Orléans |
| | Princess Maria Amalia of Naples and Sicily | Ferdinand I of the Two Sicilies (Two Sicilies) | 26 April 1782 | 25 November 1809 | | 9 August 1830 became Queen consort | 24 March 1866 | Louis Philippe d'Orléans |
| | Duchess Helen of Mecklenburg-Schwerin | Frederick Louis, Hereditary Grand Duke of Mecklenburg-Schwerin (Mecklenburg-Schwerin) | 24 January 1814 | 30 May 1837 | | 13 July 1842 husband's death | 17 May 1858 | Ferdinand Philippe |

== Other links ==
- Dauphine and Princess of France
- Duchess of Valois
- Duchess of Chartres
- Duchess of Montpensier
- Duchess of Châtellerault
- Dauphine of Auvergne
- Princess of Joinville
- Duchess of Anjou
- Duchess of Guise
- Duchess of Penthièvre
- Duchess of Galliera
- Duchess of Vendôme
- Duchess of Aumale
- Duchess of Angoulême
- Duchess of Alençon
- Duchess of Étampes
- Duchess of Saint-Fargeau
- Countess of Évreux
- Countess of Eu
- Countess of Clermont
- Countess of La Marche
- Dauphine of Auvergne

== See also ==
- List of Frankish kings
- Duke of Orléans
- Count of Orléans
