= Count of Blois =

- Arms of the House of Blois
- Creation date: 832
- Created by: Louis the Pious
- Peerage: Nobility of France
- First holder: William, Count of Blois
- Last holder: Gaston, Duke of Orléans
- Subsidiary titles: Count of Châteaudun; Count of Chartres (until 1286); Count of Dunois (from 1241); Lord of Avesnes (from 1241)
- Status: Dissolved
- Extinction date: 1660
- Seat: Château of Blois

During the Middle Ages, the counts of Blois were among the most powerful vassals of the king of France.

This title of nobility seems to have been created in 832 by Emperor Louis the Pious for William, the youngest son of Count Adrian of Orléans. Over a few decades, the county was gathered to the royal lands of France until the end of the 9th century, before being relegated to the status of viscount.

From its autonomy around 940 to the definitive integration to the Duchy of Orleans in 1397, the county was directed by the son of the last viscount's descendants, Theobald I. His descendants, called House of Blois ended up related to a large number of European noble families.

In 1397, the title was ceded by Count Guy II to Duke Louis I of Orléans, who was the second son of King Charles V. The last hereditary count of Blois was his grandson, Louis XII, who became king in 1498.

The title reappeared in 1626 when a County of Blois was again made independent of Orléans and granted to Duke Gaston of Orléans. However, King Louis XIV refused this favor to his brother, Philippe, when he received the traditional apanage in 1660.

== Carolingian county (832–c.900) ==
It is likely, but not certain, that the title of count of Blois was granted before the year 832.

Portrait	Name	Reign	Other titles	Description
	William of Orléans (died in 834)	832–834	None	Son of Count Adrian of Orléans, he was invested with the title of first Count of Blois by King Louis the Pious, being his father's vassal. By 834, he allied with King Pepin I of Aquitaine so that the latter could recover his kingdom, which had been given to his half–brother, King Charles II. The mission was successful, but William died, with no descendants. His brother Odo was appointed as his heir but died the same day.
	Robert the Strong (c. 815 – Sept. 866)	834–866	Margrave of Neustria; Count of Orléans; Count of Tours; Count of Anjou; Count of Auxerre; Count of Nevers	Supposed son of Count Robert III of Worms and Waldrade, the last daughter of Count Adrian, who would have inherited the county as a dowry following the death of her two brothers and her husband in the war against King Charles II. He inherited the county of Orléans around 860 following the fall of Count William of Orléans, uncle of the previous one.
	Hugh the Abbot (died in 886)	866–886	Margrave of Neustria; Count of Paris; Count of Orléans; Count of Tours; Count of Anjou; Count of Auxerre; Count of Nevers	Son of Count Conrad I of Auxerre and Adelaide of Tours, he was Robert the Strong's sworn enemy before his death, but he inherited his possessions and raised Robert's two orphaned sons, Odo and Robert I.
	Odo (died in 898)	886–888	King of the Franks; Margrave of Neustria; Count of Paris; Count of Orléans; Count of Tours; Count of Anjou	Eldest son of Robert the Strong, elected King of the Franks by 888, he decided to pass on his other titles to his brother Robert I.
	Robert I (died in 923)	888 – c. 900	Margrave of Neustria; Count of Paris; Count of Orléans; Count of Tours	Younger brother of the previous one, he was not elected King when his brother died in 898. He focused on the counties of Paris and Orléans, and he decided to gradually delegate the management of Blésois, Touraine and Anjou to viscounts.

== Viscounts during the Robertian era (before 900–940) ==
Portrait	Name	Reign	Other titles	Description
	Garnegaud (died after 906)	before 896– after 906	Count of Chartres	Garnegaud and his wife Helena have no known heirs. As the Thibaldians were present in Blois in the 920s, this would place Garnegaud's death in the 910s.
	Theobald the Elder (c. 890 – died in 940)	before 921–940	Viscount of Tours	He was made Viscount of Tours in 909, then Viscount of Blois. He married Richilde.

== House of Blois (956–1230) ==
Portrait	Name	Reign	Other titles	Description
	Theobald I, aka Theobald the Trickster (c. 910–977)	940–977	Count of Tours; Count of Chartres; Count of Châteaudun; Lord of Provins; Lord of Chinon; Lord of Saumur	Son of Theobald the Elder and Richilde. He was a faithful vassal of Hugh the Great which entrusted him with a vast county around 940 including Tours, Blois, Chartres and Châteaudun. He married Countess Luitgarde of Vermandois. During the infancy of Hugh Capet (956–960), Theobald became autonomous and get close to the Carolingian King Lothair II. Theobald enforced many territories or build many fortresses like Vierzon, Sancerre, Chinon, Saumur, Beaugency, and Provins.
	Odo I (c. 950 – died in 996)	977–996	Count of Tours; Count of Chartres; Count of Châteaudun; Count of Provins; Count of Reims; Count of Beauvais; Count of Dreux	Second son of Count Theobald I and Luitgarde, he succeeded to his father after his brother's death in Normandy. He attacked Count Bouchard I of Vendôme, a King Hugh Capet's ally, and conquered Melun. He bought his alleagence to the King by giving the county of Dreux to him. He married the Carolingian Bertha of Burgundy.
	Theobald II (c. 983 – 11 July 1004)	996–1004	Count of Tours; Count of Chartres; Count of Châteaudun; Count of Provins; Count of Reims; Count of Beauvais	Elder son of Count Odo I, her reign was mainly supervized by his mother, who remarried King Robert II. The King took back Tours from Count Fulk III of Anjou, but Theobald died due to exhaustion on the way back from Rome in 1004, when he was 19.
	Odo II (c. 985 – 15 Nov. 1037)	1004–1037	Count of Tours; Count of Chartres; Count of Châteaudun; Count of Provins; Count of Reims; Count of Beauvais; Count of Sancerre; Count of Meaux; Count of Troyes	Younger brother of Count Theobald II, he declared war to all his neighbors, and refused to give back his dowry (half of the county of Dreux) to Duke Richard II of Normandy. He continued to fight against Count Fulk III of Anjou, and finally won against him, but he was defeated in his turn in Pontlevoy by Count Herbert I of Maine. By 1022, he inherited the county of Troyes and Meaux from his cousin, and gathered the Blois-Champagne territory. Since he was also son of Bertha of Burgundy, he claimed his succession rights over the Kingdom of Arles from 1032 onwards, but he was killed next to Bar-le-Duc 5 years later.
	Theobald III (c. 1019 – Sept. 1089)	1037–1089	Count of Tours; Count of Chartres; Count of Châteaudun; Count of Provins; Count of Reims; Count of Beauvais; Count of Sancerre; Count of Meaux; Count of Troyes; Lord of Château-Thierry	Elder son of Odo II, who transmitted him the county, but Theobald refused to recognize King Henry I's legitimacy. As a result, the king took the county of Tours back to give it to his ally, Count Geoffrey IV of Anjou, after the battle of Nouy of 1044. He gathered again his father's territories of Blois and Champagne by getting rid of his cousin, Odo, and established Champagne as a proper county. He married Gersent of Le Mans, the daughter of his father's foe.
	Stephen (c. 1045 – died in 1102)	1089–1102	Count of Chartres; Count of Châteaudun; Count of Provins; Count of Sancerre; Count of Meaux; Count of Reims	Elder son of Theobald III, he married Adela, daughter of William the Conqueror. Under his wife's influence, he was among the first noblemen in responding to Pope Urban II's call for the First Crusade. With other counts, he fell out of favor when they left the Siege of Antioch, but Count Stephen found a more honorable death at the second battle of Ramla of 1102. His second son was King Stephen of England (1135–1154).
	Theobald IV aka Theobald the Great (c. 1090/1095 – 10 Jan. 1152)	1102–1152	Count of Chartres; Count of Châteaudun; Count of Troyes; Count of Champagne; Lord of Sancerre	First son of Stephen and Adela of Normandy, his reign was managed by his mother until his majority. He faced upheavals from his vassal Hugh III of Le Puiset. When his uncle went to the Holy Land, he inherited the County of Champagne. He was approached by the Norman barons to become king of England, who also called on him to become their duke but, in the end, his brother Stephen was chosen in 1135. Instead, he turned the Champagne into a powerful county, and founded the Champagne fairs.
	Theobald V aka Theobald the Good (1130 – died in 1191)	1152–1191	Count of Chartres; Count of Châteaudun	When his father Theobald IV died, his territories were split between his sons, among which Theobald received the county of Blois and the Champagne was offered to Henry. Theobald tried to conquer Vendôme and took part of Henry the Young King's rebellion to reconquer Tours. He married Alice of France and, as a consequence, entered into the royal family. With his nephew Count Henry II of Champagne, he joined the Third Crusade, but was killed during the Siege of Acre in 1191.
	Louis I (1171 – 14 April 1205)	1191–1205	Count of Chartres; Count of Châteaudun; Duke of Nicaea	Son of Theobald V, whom he beneathed the county from. He married Catherine of Clermont, who was the heiress of the county of Clermont. He was also part of the Fourth Crusade, and was made in 1204 duke of Nicaea, Anatolia. He was killed the following year, during the Battle of Adrianople, on April 14.
	Theobald VI (1190–1218)	1205–1218	Count of Chartres; Count of Châteaudun; Count of Clermont	Unique son of Count Louis, he inherited both counties of Blois and Clermont. He got leprosy when he travelled to Spain, and died in 1218 while being recluse and having no descendant. The counties of Blois, Chartres, and Châteaudun were split between his aunts, Margaret of Blois and Isabelle of Chartres.
	Margaret (1170 – Sept. 1230)	1218–1230	Countess of Châteaudun	Third daughter of Theobald V and Alice of France, she inherited the counties of Blois and Châteaudun when her nephew died. Her husband, Walter II of Avesnes, was the jure uxoris count during her life.

== House of Avesnes (1230–1241) ==
Title held by House of Avesnes.

Portrait	Name	Reign	Other titles	Description
	Mary (c. 1200 – 1241)	1230–1241	Countess of Châteaudun; Lady of Avesnes; Lady of Bohain; Lady of Guise	Daughter of Countess Margaret and Walter II of Avesnes, she inherited all her parents' domains, and thus became countess of Blois and Châteaudun, and lady of Avesnes, Bohain, and Guise. She married Count Hugh I of St Pol who was the jure uxoris count during her reign.

== House of Châtillon (1241–1397) ==
Title held by House of Châtillon.

Portrait	Name	Reign	Other titles	Description
	John I (died in 1279)	1241–1279	Count of Chartres; Count of Châteaudun; Lord of Avesnes; Lord of Guise	Son of Countess Mary and Count Hugh, he was count of Blois, then count of Dunois and Chartres, and lord of Avesnes and Guise.
	Joan (c. 1253 – 29 Jan. 1292)	1279–1292	Countess of Chartres; Countess of Châteaudun; Lady of Guise	Daughter of Count John and Lady Alix of Brittany. She sold the county of Chartres to King Philip IV, and died a few years later. Her holdings were transmitted to her cousin, Hugh.
	Hugh II (9 April 1258 – 1307)	1292–1307	Count of Châteaudun	Grandson of Countess Mary through his father, Count Guy III of St Pol, he renounced to the county of St Pol when he received that of Blois by 1292.
	Guy I (1298–1342)	1307–1342	Count of Châteaudun; Lord of Fréteval; Lord of Château-Renault	Son of Count Hugh II and Béatrice of Dampierre, he was part of the beginning of the Hundred Years' War when it broke out in 1337, along with his brother-in-law, King Philip VI.
	Louis II (1320–1346)	1342–1346	Count of Châteaudun; Lord of Fréteval	Son of Count Guy and Margaret of Valois, he beneathed the county of Blois and Dunois, but died during the battle of Crécy, in northern France.
	Louis III (bef. 1340–1372)	1346–1372	Count of Châteaudun; Count of Soissons; Lord of Fréteval	Son of Count Louis I, he succeeded to his father when he was a child, so her mother was regent during his reign's first years. He died with no heirs and devolved by his wills the counties of Blois and Avesnes to his brother, John.
	John II (1340–1381)	1372–1381	Count of Châteaudun; Count of Soissons; Lord of Fréteval	Brother of Count Louis II, he died with no heirs after losing the War of the Guelderian Succession.
	Guy II (1346 – 22 Dec. 1397)	1381–1397	Count of Châteaudun; Lord of Fréteval	Brother of the two precedent counts, he was born a few months after his fater's death. He inherited the counties of his brother John II and all his close family's remaining territories: Blois, Châteaudun, Soissons, and Avesnes. By 1360, he was taken prisoner by the English as a consequence of treaty of Brétigny. His release costed him the county of Soissons. In 1374, he married his cousin Marie of Namur, with whom he had a son, Lord Louis III, who died in 1391. Therefore, Guy decided to give his titles to Duke Louis I of Orléans (even though there were closer heirs in the House of Blois-Châtillon). From 1391 to his death, he remained the usufructuary count of Blois.

== House of Orléans (1397–1498, 1626–1660) ==
Portrait	Name	Reign	Other titles	Description
	Louis I of Orléans (13 March 1372 – 23 Nov. 1407)	1397–1407	Duke of Orléans; Duke of Touraine; Count of Valois; Count of Soissons; Count of Angoulême; Count of Vertus	Second son of King Charles V, Orléanais is given to him as an apanage in 1392, then he received the full rights on Bloisian when Count Guy II died in 1397. He was assassinated on the Duke of Burgundy's order, John the Fearless.
	Charles of Orléans (24 Nov. 1394 – 5 Jan. 1465)	1407–1465	Duke of Orléans; Count of Valois; Count of Soissons	Son of the precedent one. After a journey in England, he married Marie of Cleves, settled in the château of Blois then in Tours where he negotiated a truce in 1444 which eventually would end the Hundred Years' War.
	Louis II of Orléans, then Louis XII of France (27 June 1462 – 1st Jan. 1515)	1465–1498	Duke of Orléans; Count of Valois; King of France (after 1498)	Son of the precedent one. Born in the château of Blois, he went to Amboise when King Charles VIII died in 1498. He was immediately crowned under the name Louis XII. As a consequence, the duchy of Orléans came back to the Crown's lands, and the entire King's court moved to Blois.

On August 6, 1626, after a failed conspiracy in Nantes, Duke Gaston reluctantly accepted to marry the wealthy lady Duchess Marie of Montpensier, as Cardinal Richelieu wanted him to do. As a gift, he received the duchies of Orléans and of Chartres, plus the county of Blois.

Portrait	Name	Reign	Other titles	Description
	Gaston of Orléans (24 April 1608 – 2 Feb. 1660)	1626–1660	Duke of Orléans; Duke of Valois; Duke of Anjou; Duke of Chartres; Lord of Montargis	Second son of King Henry IV, the county was gifted to him as an apanage once he married Marie de Bourbon, Duchess of Montpensier in 1626.

When Gaston died, his Orléans-based apanage came back to the Crown. King Louis XIV decided to give it to his own younger brother, Duke Philippe, excepted Bloisian (and so the châteaux of Blois and Chambord) as well as Languedoc. Therefore, the county became definitively part of French territory.

== Sources ==
- Evergates, Theodore, ed. (1999). Aristocratic Women in Medieval France. University of Pennsylvania Press.
- Merlet, Rene (1900). Les Comtes de Chartres de Chateaudun et de Blois, aux IX et X siecles (in French). Impriemerie Garnier.
