= County of Blois =

Historical province in the Kingdom of France

- County of Kingdom of France
- c. 500–1660
- Coat of arms

- History
  - Established: c. 500
  - Disestablished: 1660
Preceded by	Succeeded by
Pagus of Blois	Orléanais

The County of Blois was a feudal principality centred on Blois, south of Paris, France. It was created just after king Clovis I conquered Roman Gaul around AD 500. Between the 8th and the 13th centuries, it was amongst the most powerful vassal counties within the Kingdom of France, after having succeeded in surrounding the Capetian dynasty's lands of France since Blois annexed the Champagne.

Since its creation up to 1498, the county was directed by counts, often with various more or less prestigious titles of nobility, or sometimes delegating their task to viscounts. The county existed until its definitive attachment to the Kingdom's lands in 1660, when Gaston, Duke of Orléans and last count of Blois, died.

== History ==
=== Ancient times ===
From the 1st to the 5th centuries, Bloisian depended on the Carnutes oppidum of Autrium (corresponding to current city of Chartres), in the Roman province of Gallia Lugdunensis Senonia. At that time, Blois was actually a little growing city around a fortress built by the Romans, named Castrum Blesense, and administrated by a Roman consul. Therefore, the surrounding region was called pagus Blesensi.

In 410, a Breton chieftain named Ivomadus would have conquered Blois as well as Chartres by overthrowing the consul in place, a man named Odo who was likely Frankish. The cheftain would have established an independent State, the Kingdom of Blois, within the Roman Empire itself, when Emperor Flavius Honorius was already weakened because of repetitive raids conducted by Barbarians. This entity is not well known to historians, but it seems to have resisted the invasion of the Visigothic Kingdom of Toulouse, but it did not resist to those by the Franks between 481 and 491.

=== A county of the Frankish kingdom ===
The Franks established there a first county named Comitatui blesensi, whose capital city was already in Blois, on the right bank of the Loire river. The counts' names of that time are not known.

When King Chlothar I died, the county was administratively attached to the Kingdom of Orleans then offered to his elder son Guntram until 592, whereas the neighboring cities of Chartres and Tours were gifted to the second son, Charibert I, yet King of Paris.

At the spiritual level, the diocese of Blois would still depend on the bishopric of Chartres, since the first Frankish Kings would have taken this decision in order to keep the clergy of Chartres away from politics and management of the Blois area.

At these times, Blois was governed by one of the 7 mayors of the palace whose mission was to select a Frankish nobleman to raise him as a count. The name of the chosen count did not come down to us, but a civil war did break out in the region. Along with the Carnutes, the Bloisians fought against people from Orléans and Châteaudun.

However, the county seems to be governed directly by the Counts of Orléans, of which the oldest known, Adrian (died before 821), would have come from the Gerolding family. They were by the way close to the Capetians since King Charlemagne married by 771 Hildegard, the Adrian's sister and daughter of Count Gerold of Anglachgau.

Hence, the title would have formally created in 832 when King Louis the Pious by making Adrian's second son, called William. Then, William gathered with King Pepin I of Aquitaine to help him retake its Kingdom, that King Louis gave to King Charles II. The first-ever known Count of Blois died in 834 during a battle in this war. Because he did not have any child, the county would have been transmitted to his supposed nephew, Robert the Strong, who would later become Count of Orléans, Anjou, Auxerre and Nevers, but also Margrave of Neustria after 861.

King Robert the Strong died in 866, and bequeathed his titles to his former foe, Count Hugh of Paris, called the Abbot, who then raised Robert's sons. Both would also become Kings of the Franks, Margraves of Neustria, Counts of Paris: first Odo, then Robert I.

In the meantime, the county was several times looted and burned down by the viking chieftain Hastein: in 851, 854, and somewhen between 856 and 857. He came again in 882 and conquered Chartres before becoming a vassal to King Louis III. The new county of Chartres was hence created right at the North of Blois.

=== Creation of a Robertian viscounty ===
Before 900, Count Robert decided to delegate the administration of a more autonomous Bloisian to a viscount. He would have chosen to replace him a man called Garnegaud (before 886 - after 906). After Garnegaud's death, Robert as count of Blois gave the viscounty to the viscount of Tours Theobald the Elder (before 923). Robert's son Hugh the Great succeeded his father. Blois remained in the Robertian domain until 940, when King Hugh is said to have offered the county to Theobald I, Count of Blois, son of the previous viscount.

=== The Thibaldian county ===
The County of Blois around 1050 (in brown).

Like his father, Theobald the Trickster was politically close to the Robertians and, therefore, to Duke Hugh. Theobald was not only promoted count of Blois by the latter, but also count of Tours, Chartres and Châteaudun.

In 958, during the infancy of the Hugh's son, Hugh Capet, Theobald gathered with Count Fulk II of Anjou, who he is allied with since the last King of Brittany perished in 952. Both went so far as to present themselves as "governors and administrators of the kingdom of Neustria" and "counts by the grace of God". From 960 onwards, Theobald got more strongly associated with Carolingian King Lothair, in peculiar during his war against Normandy. However, he did not succeed in getting the agreement of the new Duke Hugh Capet, his direct lordship.

In blue, the allied powers to the County of Blois when King Stephen of England died in 1154.

By 1019, his grandson Odo II continued the Trickster's conquests by adding to the family domain the county of Meaux as well as that of Troyes in 1023. When he died in 1037, the domains he administered were divided, until they were reunited in 1063 by Count Theobald III, Odo II's son. Meanwhile, the county of Tours was definitively lost in 1044 after the Battle of Nouy against the House of Anjou. The counties of Blois and Champagne are united again until 1152, date on which Theobald IV bequeaths Champagne to his elder Henry I and Blois to his younger brother Theobald V.

In 1171, Blois was one of the first cities in Europe to accuse its Jews of ritual crimes following the unexplained disappearance of a Christian child. On the orders of Count Theobald V, 30 to 35 Jews (out of a community of about 130 people) were burned alive on May 26 near the pitchforks.

The county remained in the Thibaldian family, but in the younger branch of Avesnes from 1230 to 1241 with Countess Mary, then in that of Blois-Châtillon until 1397. The latter lost influence, which was felt in the control of the territories included in the county. When Count Guy II gave up his domain to Duke Louis I of Orléans, for lack of direct male descendants and in the middle of the Hundred Years' War, the county was limited to the area between the manors of Vendôme, Beaugency and Valençay.

=== Incorporation to the Royal domain ===
The Duke established the Blois Castle as his official residence, since there was no castle in Orléans, even though he usually sat at the King's court in the Louvre Castle in Paris.

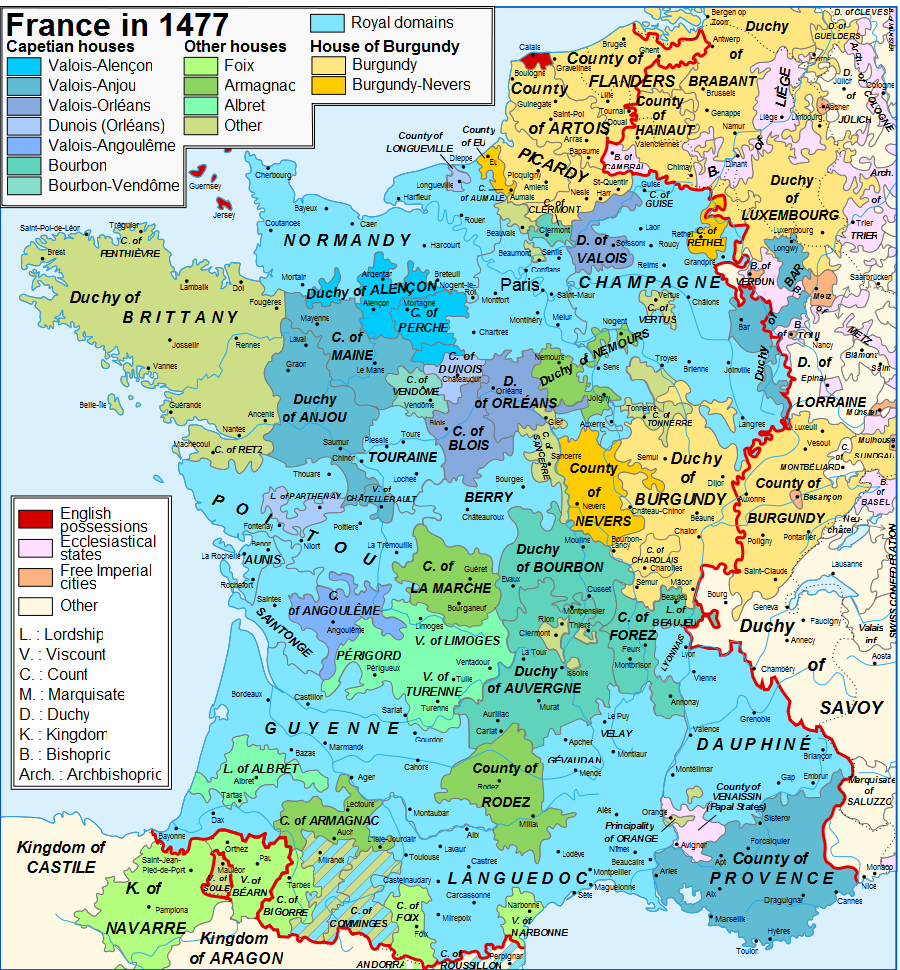
Kingdom of France in 1477.

Despite its proximity to the Atlantic front, the county was relatively spared from the Hundred Years' War. At the end of April 1429, Joan of Arc stayed in the Blois Castle before liberating Orléans, then occupied by the English.

Although they were handed down as an apanage within the house of Valois, the counties of Blois and Orléans did not formally enter the Crown's domain until 1498 when Count Louis II of Orléans was crowned King of France as Louis XII, and naturally established his court in Blois that year. He was thus the last hereditary count of Blois.

=== Continuity ===
In 1498, the county was integrated into the royal domain with the former county of Orléans, thus creating the Orléanais province. By setting up his court in Blois, King Louis XII not only invited his court's nobles to the banks of the Loire but also made Bloisian the cradle of the French Renaissance. The county became considerably richer, and a new castle was built in Blois. The treaty of Blois was signed there in 1504. By 1516, newly King François I ordered the conception of an ideal city, a "new Rome" -today known as Romorantin-, but it was aborted after the Leonardo da Vinci's death in 1519. Then began the construction of a huge annex castle dedicated to hunting in the forest of Chambord, in place of the old fortress built under the counts in the 10th century. This lasted for almost 25 years, until 1544. Later, another sovereign took the same type of decision by converting a hunting lodge into a sumptuous palace: King Louis XIV. Nevertheless, if the Sun King wished to leave the capital, King François I left Bloisian from 1526 to install his court in Paris. Since then, this move as well as the loss of the title of count relegated Blois to a simple provincial town.

In 1626, Duke Gaston of Anjou, third son of King Henry IV, married -not without regret- the rich duchess of Montpensier, Marie de Bourbon, imposed on him by Richelieu. He thus received the duchies of Orleans and Chartres as an apanage, as well as Blois, which was again raised to an independent county. His reign was marked by his motivation to renovate multiple castles within Sologne. After the Fronde, Duke Gaston d'Orléans, as he was called from then on, was assigned to that of Blois from 1652 and died in 1660 in his newly built residence in Blois-Vienne. In accordance with the appanagist tradition, his titles were transferred to Duke Philippe, King Louis XIV's younger brother, but His Majesty decided not to grant him Blois as a county. The county was thus attached once again to the royal domain.

Since that time, Bloisian no longer depends directly on the Duchy of Orléans, but remains administratively attached to the Orléanais province.

Right after the French Revolution, the department of Loir-et-Cher was created in 1790, more or less following the last borders of the county, including the cantons of Vendôme and Romorantin.
