= Duchy of Orléans =

Former part of France

Duchy of Orléans Duché d'Orléanais
- 987–1498
- Coat of arms

- Location of the duchy within France (1477 borders)
- Capital: Orléans
- Demonym: Orléanois
- Government
  - Type: Feudalism (Royal duchy)
- King of France
  - 987–996: Hugh Capet
  - 1498: Louis XII
- Duke of Orléans
  - 1344–1375: Prince Philip de Valois
  - 1465–1498: Prince Louis de Orléans
- History
  - Established: 987
  - Became a province: 1498
Preceded by	Succeeded by
County of Orléans	Orléanais
- Today part of: France

The Duchy of Orléanais (French: Duché d'Orléans) is a former royal duchy, which was created during reign of Hugh Capet by elevating the former County of Orléans. In 1498, as part of a centralisation of France under Louis XII, the duchy was dissolved and replaced by the Province of Orléanais which was informally still known as the 'Duchy of Orléanais'.

== History ==
The Duchy of Orléanais was created in 1344 by raising the former County of Orléans to a Dukedom under King Philip VI for his second son Philip de Valois. With the creation of the duchy, several localities around the former county were also integrated, they included the County of Beaugency and the Seigneurities of Neuville-aux-Bois, Yèvre-le-Châtel, Châteauneuf-en-Thymerais, Lorris, and Boiscommun. In 1375, Prince Philip died without a legitimate heir, the title of 'Duke of Orléans' and the duchy itself were merged into the royal domain (crown lands) of the King of France.

In 1392, the duchy was re-created by King Charles VI for his younger brother Louis de Valois-Orléans. The duke was later succeeded by his son Charles de Valois-Orléans who reigned until 1465 when he died of natural causes. He was succeeded by his own son Louis de Valois-Orléans, who became King Louis XII in 1498 and the title was merged into the crown once more.

In 1498, as part of a centralisation of the different regions of France, the duchy was dissolved and replaced by the new Province of Orléanais.

Dukes of Orléans
Duke	Birth	Tenure	Death	Marriage(s) Issue
Philip Other titles List: Duke of Touraine; Count of Valois	1 July 1336 Château de Vincennes Son of Philip VI of France and Joan of Burgundy	1344 – 1 September 1375	1 September 1375 Orléans Died by natural causes (aged 39)	Blanche of France(m. 1345; wid. 1375) Childless
Louis I Other titles List: Duke of Touraine; Duke of Valois; Count of Blois; Count of Soissons; Count of Angoulême	13 March 1372; Hôtel Saint-Pol, Paris Son of Charles V of France and Joanna of Bourbon	4 June 1392 – 23 November 1407	23 November 1407; Le Marais, Paris Murdered by Duke of Burgundy's hitmen (aged 35)	Valentina Visconti (m. 1389; wid. 1407); 8 children
Charles I Other titles List: Duke of Milan (titular); Duke of Valois; Count of Blois; Count of Soissons	24 November 1394; Hôtel Saint-Pol, Paris Son of Louis I and Valentina Visconti	23 November 1407 – 5 January 1465	5 January 1465; Château d'Amboise Died of natural causes (aged 70)	(1) Isabella of France (m. 1406; d. 1409); 1 children (2) Bonne of Armagnac (m. 1410; d. 1430/35); Childless (3) Maria of Cleves (m. 1440; wid. 1465); 3 children
Louis II Other titles List: Duke of Milan (titular); Duke of Valois; Count of Blois	27 June 1462; Château de Blois Son of Charles and Maria of Cleves	5 January 1465 – 7 April 1498 (Merged into the Crown titles)	1 January 1515; Hôtel des Tournelles, Paris Died of gout (aged 52)	(1) Joan of France (m. 1476; ann. 1498); Childless (2) Anne of Brittany (m. 1498; d. 1514); 2 children (3) Mary of England (m. 1514; wid. 1515); Childless
