= Duke of Orléans =

Title of French nobility

Dukedom of Orléans
- Arms of the Dukes of Orléans of the House of Orléans
- Creation date: 1344; 682 years ago
- Peerage: Peerage of France
- First holder: Philip, Duke of Orléans
- Last holder: Ferdinand Philippe of Orléans
- Status: Extinct
- Extinction date: July 13, 1842; 184 years ago
- Seats: Château-de Blois; Château-de-Saint-Cloud; Palais-Royal

Duke of Orléans (French: Duc d'Orléans, Latin: Dux Aurelianensis) was the French royal title granted by the King of France and bestowed upon their close relatives, typically being a younger brother, son or otherwise inherited through the male line. First created in 1344 by King Philip VI for his younger son Philip, the title was reused by King Charles VI for his younger brother Louis, who first passed the title on to his son and then grandson, the latter becoming King Louis XII. By 1661, the title would have been re-bestowed a total of six times when Louis XIV bestowed it upon his younger brother Philippe, who would go on to bestow it upon his male descendants, creating the Cadet branch, "Orléans" of the parent Bourbons.

Based at the Palais-Royal, Louis Philippe II, Duke of Orléans contested the legitimacy of his cousin Louis XVI in the adjacent Louvre. His son would eventually ascend to the throne in 1830 as Louis Philippe I, King of the French. The descendants of the family are the Orléanist candidates to the French throne.

Québec, Canada’s Île d'Orléans, was named after Duke of Orléans Henri II, while the city of New Orleans in the United States was named after Duke of Orléans, Philippe II.

The holder of the title held the style of Serene Highness.

== House of Valois ==
The first Dukedom of Orléans was created for Philip of Valois, seventh son of Philip VI of France and younger brother of John the Good, in 1344. This appanage merged the appanages of Touraine and Valois. However, the first ducal line ended with Philip, who died without legitimate children.

Duke	Birth	Tenure	Death	Marriage(s) Issue	Claim
Philip Other titles List: Duke of Touraine; Count of Valois	1 July 1336; Château de Vincennes Son of Philip VI of France and Joan of Burgundy	1344 – 1 September 1375	1 September 1375; Orléans Died by natural causes (aged 39)	Blanche of France (m. 1345; wid. 1375); Childless	Created duke by Philip VI

== House of Valois-Orléans ==
The second dukedom of Orléans was created in 1392 by Charles VI of France for his younger brother Louis. His role as leading figure in court, regent for his brother during his madness and wealthy landlord, as well as head of the Armagnac party, permitted his descendant to maintain a prominent role in French politics. His grandson Louis XII became king after the extinction of the direct Valois in 1498, while his great-grandson Francis I succeeded the last in 1515. The direct line of Valois-Orléans became extinct with the death of Louis XII in 1515, although the dukedom of Orléans was integrated among the crown's properties after his ascent to the throne in 1495.

Duke	Birth	Tenure	Death	Marriage(s) Issue	Claim
Louis I Other titles List: Duke of Touraine; Duke of Valois; Count of Blois; Count of Soissons; Count of Angoulême	13 March 1372; Hôtel Saint-Pol, Paris Son of Charles V of France and Joanna of Bourbon	4 June 1392 – 23 November 1407	23 November 1407; Le Marais, Paris Murdered by Duke of Burgundy's hitmen (aged 35)	Valentina Visconti (m. 1389; wid. 1407); 8 children	Created duke by Charles VI
Charles I Other titles List: Duke of Milan (titular); Duke of Valois; Count of Blois; Count of Soissons	24 November 1394; Hôtel Saint-Pol, Paris Son of Louis I and Valentina Visconti	23 November 1407 – 5 January 1465	5 January 1465; Château d'Amboise Died of natural causes (aged 70)	(1) Isabella of France (m. 1406; d. 1409); 1 children (2) Bonne of Armagnac (m. 1410; d. 1430/35); Childless (3) Maria of Cleves (m. 1440; wid. 1465); 3 children	Son of Louis I (male-blood proximity)
Louis II Other titles List: Duke of Milan (titular); Duke of Valois; Count of Blois	27 June 1462; Château de Blois Son of Charles and Maria of Cleves	5 January 1465 – 7 April 1498 (Merged into the Crown titles)	1 January 1515; Hôtel des Tournelles, Paris Died of gout (aged 52)	(1) Joan of France (m. 1476; ann. 1498); Childless (2) Anne of Brittany (m. 1498; d. 1514); 2 children (3) Mary of England (m. 1514; wid. 1515); Childless	Son of Charles (male-blood proximity)

== House of Valois-Angoulême ==
The third dukedom of Orléans was created by Francis I for his second son Henry at his birth. When Henry's elder brother and Dauphin, Francis, Duke of Brittany, died childless in 1536, Henry substituted him as Dauphin and ceded the title to his younger brother Charles, Duke of Angoulême, who died childless in 1545.

Duke	Birth	Tenure	Death	Marriage(s) Issue	Claim
Henry I Other titles List: Count of Blois	31 March 1519; Saint-Germain-en-Laye Son of Francis I of France and Claude of France	31 March 1519 – 10 August 1536 (Renounced the title to become Dauphin)	10 July 1559; Place des Vosges, Paris Accidentally killed in a joust (aged 40)	Catherine de' Medici (m. 1533; wid. 1559); 10 children	Created duke by Francis I
Charles II Other titles List: Duke of Angoulême; Duke of Bourbon; Count of Blois; Count of Clermont	22 January 1522; Saint-Germain-en-Laye Son of Francis I of France and Claude of France	10 August 1536 – 9 September 1545	9 September 1545; Forest-Montiers Died by influenza (aged 23)	Unmarried	Brother of Henry I (Elevated by Francis I)

The fourth dukedom was created by Henry II for his son Louis at his birth. The child duke, however, died one year later, and the title passed to his recently born brother Charles, who became King of France in 1560. The title passed to Charles' brother, Henry, Duke of Angoulême, who six years later exchanged the appanages of Orléans for the Dukedom of Anjou, becoming the heir in pectore of the Crown.

Duke	Birth	Tenure	Death	Marriage(s) Issue	Claim
Louis III Other titles List: Duke of Urbino (titular); Count of Blois	3 February 1549; Château of Fontainebleau Son of Henry II and Catherine de' Medici	3 February 1549 – 24 October 1550	24 October 1550; Mantes Died by exposure (aged 1)	Unmarried	Created duke by Henry II
Charles III Other titles List: Duke of Angoulême; Count of Blois	27 June 1550; Saint-Germain-en-Laye Son of Henry II and Catherine de' Medici	24 October 1550 – 5 December 1560 (Renounced the title to become King of France)	30 May 1574; Château de Vincennes Died by tuberculosis (aged 23)	Elisabeth of Austria (m. 1570; wid. 1574); 1 child	Brother of Louis III (Elevated by Henry II)
Henry II Other titles List: Duke of Angoulême; Countess of Blois	19 September 1551; Château of Fontainebleau Son of Henry II and Catherine de' Medici	5 December 1560 – 8 February 1566 (Exchanged the title for the appanage of Anjou)	2 August 1589; Château de Saint-Cloud Assassinated by Jacques Clément (aged 37)	Louise of Lorraine (m. 1570; wid. 1574)	Created duke by Charles IX

== House of Medici ==
After Henry's exchange of appanages, Charles IX gave the Orléanais to his mother Catherine, former Queen of France, as reward for her role as regent, mainly about toleration politics. She was the only suo jure Duchess of Orléans, so is included among the ruling dukes.

Duke	Birth	Tenure	Death	Marriage(s) Issue	Claim
Catherine (suo jure) Other titles List: Countess of Blois	13 April 1519; Palazzo Pitti, Florence Daughter of Lorenzo, Duke of Urbino and Madeleine de La Tour d'Auvergne	8 February 1566 – 5 January 1589	5 January 1589; Château de Blois Died by pleurisy (aged 69)	Henry II of France (m. 1533; d. 1559); 10 children	Created duchess by Charles IX

== First House of Bourbon-Orléans ==
The fifth dukedom was created in 1626 by Louis XIII for his younger brother Gaston, Duke of Anjou. Gaston became a libertine and scheming figure at court, plotting the assassination of Cardinal Richelieu and later joining the Fronde, a coalition of nobles who opposed the royal centralisation. Finally forgiven by Louis XIII, he died without male heirs, extinguishing the first Bourbon House of Orléans.

Notes: the Monsieur d'Orléans, second son of Henry IV isn't included in the list due to his short life (4 years) and lack of official baptism or name.

Duke	Birth	Tenure	Death	Marriage(s) Issue	Claim
Gaston Other titles List: Duke of Anjou; Duke of Chartres; Duke of Valois; Count of Blois	24 April 1608; Château of Fontainebleau Son of Henry IV of France and Marie de' Medici	6 August 1626 – 2 February 1660	2 February 1660; Château de Blois Died by natural causes (aged 51)	(1) Marie of Bourbon (m. 1626; d. 1627); 1 children (2) Marguerite of Lorraine (m. 1632; wid. 1660); 5 children	Created duke by Henry IV

== Second House of Bourbon-Orléans ==
The sixth and final creation was for Philip, Duke of Anjou, who received the Orléanais by his brother Louis XIV. Through his marriage with Elizabeth Charlotte of the Palatinate, he established a long dynasty that finally arose to the throne in 1830, with the deposition of Charles X and the proclamation of Louis Philippe I. Louis Philippe passed his title to his son and heir, Ferdinand, who died in a carriage accident in 1842.

Duke	Birth	Tenure	Death	Marriage(s) Issue	Claim
Philip I Other titles List: Duke of Anjou; Duke of Chartres; Duke of Valois; Duke of Nemours; Duke of Montpensier; Prince of Joinville; Count of Blois	21 September 1640; Saint-Germain-en-Laye Son of Louis XIII and Anne of Austria	10 May 1661 – 9 June 1701	9 June 1701; Château de Saint-Cloud Died by stroke (aged 60)	(1) Henrietta of England (m. 1661; d. 1670); 3 children (2) Elizabeth Charlotte of the Palatinate (m. 1671; wid. 1701); 3 children	Created duke by Louis XIV
Philip II Other titles List: Duke of Chartres; Duke of Valois; Duke of Nemours; Duke of Montpensier; Prince of Joinville; Count of Blois	2 August 1674; Château de Saint-Cloud Son of Philip I and Elizabeth Charlotte of the Palatinate	9 June 1701 – 2 December 1723	2 December 1723; Palace of Versailles Died by natural causes (aged 49)	Françoise Marie de Bourbon (m. 1692; wid. 1723); 8 children	Son of Philip I (male-preference proximity)
Louis Other titles List: Duke of Chartres; Duke of Valois; Duke of Nemours; Duke of Montpensier; Prince of Joinville; Count of Blois	4 August 1703; Palace of Versailles Son of Philip II and Françoise Marie de Bourbon	2 December 1723 – 4 February 1752	4 February 1752; St. Genevieve, Paris Died by delirium complications (aged 48)	Johanna of Baden-Baden (m. 1724; d. 1726); 2 children	Son of Philip II (male-preference proximity)
Louis Philippe I Other titles List: Duke of Chartres; Duke of Valois; Duke of Nemours; Duke of Montpensier; Prince of Joinville; Count of Blois	12 May 1725; Palace of Versailles Son of Louis and Johanna of Baden-Baden	4 February 1752 – 18 November 1785	18 November 1785; Château de Sainte-Assise Died by natural causes (aged 60)	Louise Henriette de Bourbon (m. 1743; d. 1759); 3 children Morganatic: Charlotte-Jeanne Béraud (m. 1773; wid. 1785); Childless	Son of Louis (male-preference proximity)
Louis Philippe II Other titles List: Duke of Chartres; Duke of Valois; Duke of Nemours; Duke of Montpensier; Prince of Joinville; Count of Blois	13 April 1747; Château de Saint-Cloud Son of Louis Philip I and Louise Henriette de Bourbon	18 November 1785 – 6 November 1793	6 November 1793; Conciergerie, Paris Executed for treason (aged 46)	Marie-Adélaïde de Bourbon (m. 1768; wid. 1793); 5 children	Son of Louis Philip I (male-preference proximity)
Louis Philippe III Other titles List: Duke of Chartres; Duke of Valois; Duke of Nemours; Prince of Joinville; Count of Blois	6 October 1773; Palais-Royal, Paris Son of Louis Philip II and Marie-Adélaïde de Bourbon	6 November 1793 – 9 August 1830 (Renounced the title to become King of the French)	26 August 1850; Claremont, England Died by natural causes (aged 76)	Maria Amalia of Naples and Sicily (m. 1809; wid. 1850); 10 children	Son of Louis Philip II (male-preference proximity)
Ferdinand Other titles List: Duke of Chartres	3 September 1810; Royal Palace, Palermo Son of Louis Philip III and Maria Amalia of Naples and Sicily	9 August 1830 – 13 July 1842	13 July 1842; Neuilly-sur-Seine Died in an accident (aged 31)	Helene of Mecklenburg (m. 1837; wid. 1842); 2 children	Son of Louis Philip III (male-preference proximity)

== Current use ==
- Legitimists recognize as Duke of Orléans Jean, Count of Paris, Head of the House of Orléans, inheriting the title as the heir male of Philip I, Duke of Orléans.
- Orleanists recognize as Duke of Orléans Prince Jacques of Orléans (1941–), son of Henri, Count of Paris (1933–2019) and uncle of Jean, Count of Paris. Per Orleanists, the title merged with the crown in 1883 and was subsequently granted to Prince Jacques upon his marriage in 1969 to Gersende de Sabran (1942–), with whom he has three children: Diane, Charles-Louis, and Foulques.

== See also ==
- Duchess of Orléans
- Count of Orléans
- Orleanist
- Legitimist
- Dauphin of France
- Duke of York
