= William, Count of Blois =

Count of Blois (died 834)

William of Orléans

Count of Blois
- Reign: 830 – 834
- Predecessor: None
- Successor: Robert the Strong
- Died: 834; Touraine
- House: Udalriching
- Father: Adrian, Count of Orléans
- Mother: Waldrada

William of Orléans (died 834), known as The Constable, was a magnate in the Frankish Empire during the reign of his first cousin, Louis the Pious. He was the Count of Blois from about 830 and, at the time of his death in battle, was Louis's constable. William was the son of Adrian, Count of Orléans, and Waldrada. (Note: "Adrien ( Bavarois ) et de Waldrada parent de leurs fils Willihelm comte de Blois et de son frère Odo comte d'Orléans..") His brother was Odo, Count of Orléans, and he was also a kinsman of Bernard of Septimania.

In 834, the emperor's son, Lothair rebelled, supported by Count Lambert I of Nantes and Matfrid, the former Count of Orléans. The emperor sent an army against them under the leadership of William and Odo. A battle took place in the Touraine after Whitsunday (25 May), at which both William and Odo died, along with several other notables: a certain Count Fulbert, Count Guy of Maine and Abbot Theoto of Saint-Martin, the imperial archchancellor. The historian Adrevald of Fleury referred to these men as "leaders of war" (ductores belli). Although William is also named in the Annales Bertiniani and the Vita Hludovici, he is not mentioned by Nithard in his account of the battle.

== Sources ==
- Keats-Rohan, K.S.B. (2000). Onomastique et parenté dans l'Occident médiéval (in French). Unit for Prosopographical Research.
- Le Jan, Régine (2003). Famille et pouvoir dans le monde franc (VIIe-Xe siècle) (in French). Publications de la Sorbonne.
- Nelson, Janet L. (1991). The Annals of St-Bertin. Manchester University Press.
- Quervelle, Pierre-Marie (1952). Blois, son Chateau, ses Musee, ses Monuments (in French). Editions du Courdrier. ISBN 9782402199520.
- Werner, Karl Ferdinand (2004). Enquêtes sur les premiers temps du principat français (IXe-Xe siècles). Thorbecke.

== See also ==
- Jackman, Donald C. (2015). Three Bernards Sent South to Govern. Enplage Editions.

Preceded by Title Established	Count of Blois; 830-834	Succeeded by Robert the Strong
