= Louis of Valois =

Louis of Valois (French: Louis de Valois) may refer to:

- Louis XI, king of France (r. 1461–1483)
- Louis XII, king of France (r. 1498–1515)
- Louis of Valois, Count of Chartres (1318–1328)
- Louis I, Duke of Orléans (1372–1407)
- Louis, Duke of Guyenne (1397–1415)
- Louis I of Anjou (1339–1384)
- Louis II of Anjou, king of Naples (r. 1389–1399)
- Louis III of Anjou, king of Naples (r. 1417–1426)
- Louis II d'Orléans, Duke of Longueville (1510–1537)
- Louis of Valois (1549–1550), prince

== See also ==
- House of Valois
