= Appanage =

Grant to a younger child of a monarch

An appanage, or apanage (/ˈæpənɪdʒ/; French: apanage [apanaʒ]), is the grant of an estate, title, office or other thing of value to a younger child of a monarch, who would otherwise have no inheritance under the system of primogeniture (where only the eldest inherits). It was common in much of Europe.

The system of appanage greatly influenced the territorial construction of France and the German states and explains why many of the former provinces of France had coats of arms which were modified versions of the king's arms.

== Etymology ==
Late Latin *appanaticum, from appanare or adpanare 'to give bread' (panis), a pars pro toto for food and other necessities, hence for a "subsistence" income, notably in kind, as from assigned land.

== Original appanage: in France ==
=== History of the French appanage ===
An appanage was a concession of a fief by the sovereign to his younger sons, while the eldest son became king on the death of his father. Appanages were considered as part of the inheritance transmitted to the puisné (younger sons). (Note: French puis, "later", + né, "born [masc.]") The word Juveigneur (Note: from the Latin comparative iuvenior, 'younger [masc.]'; in Brittany's customary law only the youngest brother) was specifically used for the royal princes holding an appanage. These lands returned to the royal domain (the territory directly controlled by the king) on the extinction of the princely line, and could not be sold (neither hypothetically nor as a dowry). Daughters were initially able to inherit the appanages under the Capetian kings. However, under the House of Valois, Salic law was applied, which prohibited women from inheriting.

The system of appanage has played a particularly important role in France. It developed there with the extension of royal authority from the 13th century, then disappeared from the late Middle Ages with the affirmation of the exclusive authority of the royal state. It strongly influenced the territorial construction, explaining the arms of several provinces. The prerogative of Burgundy is also the origin of the Belgian, Luxembourgeois and Dutch states, through the action of its dukes favored by their position in the court of the kings of France.

Primogeniture avoids territorial splintering, which the earlier Frankish tradition of partible inheritance (equal division) suffered from (e.g. under the Merovingians and subsequent Carolingians). But primogeniture creates resentment in younger sons who inherit nothing. Appanages thus were used to sweeten the bitter pill of primogeniture and deter revolt of younger sons by diverting their aspirations of claiming their eldest brother's throne.

==== House of Capet ====
Unlike their predecessors (the Carolingians), the Capetian dynasty's hold on the crown was initially tenuous. They could not afford to divide the kingdom among all their sons, and the royal domain was very small, initially consisting solely of the Île-de-France. So the Capetians broke away from the Frankish custom of partible inheritance, to instead have the eldest son alone become King and receive the royal domain (except for any appanages). Most Capetians endeavored to add to the royal domain through incorporation of additional fiefs, large or small, and thus gradually obtained direct lordship over almost all of France.

Their first king Hugh Capet (elected King of the Franks on the death of Louis V in 987) only had one son, Robert II. But Robert had multiple sons. One of them, Henry I of France, became the first king to create an appanage in 1032, when he gave the Duchy of Burgundy to his younger brother Robert I of Burgundy (whose descendants retained the duchy until 1361 with the extinction of the first Capetian House of Burgundy by the death of Philip de Rouvre).

Louis VIII and Louis IX also created appanages.

==== House of Valois ====
The king who created the most powerful appanages for his sons was John II of France. His youngest son, Philip the Bold, founded the second Capetian House of Burgundy in 1363. By marrying the heiress of Flanders, Philip also became ruler of the Low Countries.

King Charles V tried to abolish the appanage system, but in vain. Provinces conceded in appanage tended to become de facto independent and the authority of the king was recognized there reluctantly. In particular the line of Valois Dukes of Burgundy caused considerable trouble to the French crown, with which they were often at war, often in open alliance with the English. Theoretically appanages could be reincorporated into the royal domain but only if the last lord had no male heirs. Kings tried as much as possible to rid themselves of the most powerful appanages. Louis XI retook the Duchy of Burgundy at the death of its last duke, Charles the Bold. Francis I confiscated the Bourbonnais, after the treason in 1523 of his commander in chief, Charles III, Duke of Bourbon, the 'constable of Bourbon' (died 1527 in the service of Emperor Charles V).

The first article of the Edict of Moulins (1566) declared that the royal domain (defined in the second article as all the land controlled by the crown for more than ten years) could not be alienated, except in two cases: by interlocking, in the case of financial emergency, with a perpetual option to repurchase the land; and to form an appanage, which must return to the crown in its original state on the extinction of the male line. The apanagist (incumbent) therefore could not separate himself from his appanage in any way.

After Charles V of France, a clear distinction had to be made between titles given as names to children in France, and true appanages. At their birth the French princes received a title independent of an appanage. Thus, the Duke of Anjou, grandson of Louis XIV, never possessed Anjou and never received any revenue from this province. The king waited until the prince had reached adulthood and was about to marry before endowing him with an appanage. The goal of the appanage was to provide him with a sufficient income to maintain his noble rank.

The fief given in appanage could be the same as the title given to the prince, but this was not necessarily the case.

Only seven appanages were given from 1515 to 1789.

==== Post-Revolution ====
Appanages were abolished in 1792 before the proclamation of the Republic. The youngest princes from then on were to receive a grant of money but no territory.

Appanages were reestablished under the first French empire by Napoleon Bonaparte and confirmed by the Bourbon restoration-king Louis XVIII. The last of the appanages, the Orléanais, was reincorporated to the French crown when the Duke of Orléans, Louis Philippe I, became king of the French in 1830.

The word apanage is still used in French figuratively, in a non-historic sense: "to have appanage over something" is used, often in an ironic and negative sense, to claim exclusive possession over something. For example, "cows have appanage over prions".

=== List of major French appanages ===
==== Direct Capetians ====
- Henry I gave the Duchy of Burgundy to his brother Robert.
- Louis VI gave the County of Dreux to his son Robert. The lineage of the counts became extinct in 1355, but a cadet line, descended from Pierre Mauclerc, became Dukes of Brittany.
- Philip II gave his son Philippe Hurepel the county of Clermont, then the counties of Domfront and Mortain.
- Louis VIII, by his 1225 will, granted
  - the County of Artois to his second son Robert. Artois was lost by Robert's male heirs, passing through a female line, and eventually was inherited by the Dukes of Burgundy. Louis XI seized it upon the death of Charles the Bold in 1477, but his son returned it to Charles's heirs in preparation for his invasion of Italy in 1493.
  - the Counties of Poitou and Auvergne to his fourth son Alphonse. These returned to the crown when Alphonse died without heirs in 1271.
  - the Counties of Anjou and Maine to his third son John. They returned to the crown when John died without heirs in 1232.
- Louis IX endowed
  - the Counties of Anjou and Maine (1246) to his youngest brother, Charles. They passed to Charles's granddaughter, who married Charles, Count of Valois, the younger son of Philip III, and thence to their son, Philip. When Philip inherited the throne as Philip VI, the lands reverted to the crown.
  - the County of Orléans to his eldest son, Philip. It returned to the crown when he succeeded his father in 1270 as Philip III.
  - the County of Valois (c. 1268) to his second son, Jean Tristan. This title became extinct upon Jean Tristan's death in 1270.
  - the Counties of Alençon and Perche (1268) to his third son, Pierre. This title became extinct on Pierre's death in 1284.
  - the County of Clermont-en-Beauvaisis (1269) to his fourth son, Robert. Robert's son, Louis, was later given the Duchy of Bourbon, which was treated as an appanage, although it was not technically one. Louis later traded Clermont for La Marche with his cousin Charles, Count of Angoulême, younger brother of King Philip V. These appanages remained in the Bourbon family until they were confiscated due to the treason of Charles III, Duke of Bourbon in 1527.
- Philip III granted
  - the County of Valois to his second son Charles. Charles was later given the Counties of Alençon, Perche, and Chartres by his brother, Philip IV of France. Valois passed to Charles's eldest son Philip upon his death in 1325, and returned to the crown when Philip became King Philip VI in 1328. Alençon and Perche passed to Charles's younger son, Charles. A descendant was raised to the dignity of Duke of Alençon. These titles returned to the crown upon the extinction of the Alençon line in 1525.
  - the County of Beaumont-sur-Oise to his third son Louis. Louis was later given the County of Évreux by his brother Philip IV. These titles returned to the throne upon the death of Queen Blanche of Navarre in 1441.
- Philip IV endowed
  - the County of Poitou for his second son, Philip. This title returned to the throne when Philip became king in 1316.
  - the Counties of La Marche and Angoulême for his third son, Charles IV. Charles later traded La Marche for the County of Clermont-en-Beauvaisis with the Duke of Bourbon. His titles returned to the throne when Charles became king in 1322.

==== House of Valois ====
- Philip VI granted
  - the Duchy of Normandy to his elder son John. This title returned to the throne when John succeeded his father in 1350.
  - the Duchy of Orléans to his younger son Philip. This title returned to the throne when Philip died without issue in 1375.
- John II 'the Good', on his departure to England in 1360, granted
  - the Duchies of Anjou and of Maine to his second son Louis. This title returned to the throne upon the death of duke Charles IV, Louis I's great-grandson, in 1481.
  - the Duchies of Berry and Auvergne to his third son John. These titles returned to the throne upon John's death without male issue in 1416.
  - In 1363, John II granted the Duchy of Burgundy to his fourth son Philip. Upon the death of Philip's great-grandson Charles the Bold in 1477, King Louis XI claimed the reversion of Burgundy and seized the territory. It continued to be claimed, however, by Charles's daughter Mary and her heirs. When Mary's grandson Emperor Charles V defeated and captured Francis I at the Battle of Pavia in 1525, he forced Francis to sign a treaty recognizing him as Duke of Burgundy, but Francis disavowed the treaty when he was released, and the cession was revoked by the Treaty of Cambrai four years later. Charles and his heirs reserved their claims, however, and this reservation was repeated as late as the Treaty of the Pyrenees in 1659, when Philip IV of Spain continued to reserve his rights to the Duchy.
- Charles VI granted the Duchy of Orléans and the County of Angoulême to his brother Louis in 1392. The Duchy of Orléans returned to the crown when Louis I's grandson became Louis XII of France in 1498. The County of Angoulême returned to the crown when Louis I's great-grandson became Francis I of France in 1515.
- Louis XI granted the Duchies of Berry, Normandy, and Guyenne to his younger brother Charles. These titles returned to the crown when Charles died in 1472.
- Francis I granted the Duchies of Orléans, Angoulême, and Châtellerault and the Counties of Clermont-en-Beauvaisis and La Marche to his second surviving son, Charles in 1540. To this was added the Duchy of Bourbon in 1544. These titles returned to the crown when Charles died without issue in 1545.
- Charles IX granted
  - the Duchies of Anjou and Bourbonnais and the County of Forez to the older of his two brothers, Henry, in 1566. He added the Duchy of Auvergne to these holdings in 1569. The titles returned to the crown when Henry succeeded his brother in 1574.
  - the Duchies of Alençon and Château-Thierry and the Counties of Perche, Mantes, and Meulan to his youngest brother, Francis in 1566. To this he later added the Duchy of Évreux and the County of Dreux in 1569. Francis's other brother, Henry III, increased his holdings still further in 1576, granting him the Duchies of Anjou, Touraine, and Berry and the County of Maine. All these titles returned to the crown upon Francis's death without issue in 1584.

==== House of Bourbon ====
- Louis XIII granted the Duchies of Orléans and Chartres and the County of Blois to his younger brother Gaston in 1626. To this was added the Duchy of Valois in 1630. These titles returned to the crown on Gaston's death without male issue in 1660.
- Louis XIV granted
  - the Duchies of Orléans, Chartres, and Valois to his brother, Philippe in 1661. To this was added the Duchy of Nemours in 1672. These titles passed to his descendants and were abolished during the Revolution in 1790. They were restored to the heir at the time of the Restoration in 1814. At the accession of Louis Philippe I, these titles merged into the crown.
  - the Duchies of Alençon and Angoulême and the County of Ponthieu to his third grandson, Charles, duc de Berry in 1710. These titles returned to the crown upon his death without surviving issue in 1714.
- Louis XV granted
  - the Duchy of Anjou and the Counties of Maine, Perche, and Senonches to his second surviving grandson, Louis-Stanislas, comte de Provence in 1771. Louis-Stanislas was further given the Duchy of Alençon by his brother Louis XVI in 1774. These titles were abolished during the Revolution in 1790. When the monarchy and appanages were restored in 1814, Louis had inherited the throne as Louis XVIII, and his titles merged into the crown.
  - the Duchies of Auvergne, Angoulême and Mercœur and the Viscounty of Limoges to his youngest grandson Charles, comte d'Artois in 1773. To this was added in 1774 by his brother, Louis XVI the Marquisate of Pompadour and the Viscounty of Turenne. In 1776, Louis XVI deprived Charles of Limoges, Pompadour, and Turenne, and gave him in exchange the Duchies of Berry and Châteauroux, the Counties of Argenton and Ponthieu, and the Lordship of Henrichemont. In 1778, the appanage was further reshaped, with Auvergne and Mercœur removed and replaced with the County of Poitou, leaving Charles with a final appanage consisting of the Duchies of Angoulême, Berry, and Châteauroux, the Counties of Argenton, Ponthieu, and Poitou, and the Lordship of Henrichemont. These titles were abolished during the Revolution in 1790, but were restored at the time of the Restoration in 1814. They merged into the crown when Charles became king in 1824.

Although Napoleon restored the idea of appanage in 1810 for his sons, none were ever granted, nor were any new appanages created by the restoration monarchs.

== Western feudal appanages outside France ==
=== Appanages within Britain ===
English and British monarchs frequently granted appanages to younger sons of the monarch. Most famously, the Houses of York and Lancaster, whose feuding over the succession to the English throne after the end of the main line of the House of Plantagenet caused the Wars of the Roses, were both established when the Duchies of York and Lancaster were given as appanages for Edmund of Langley and John of Gaunt respectively, two of the four younger sons of King Edward III.

In modern times, the Duchy of Cornwall is the permanent statutory appanage of the monarch's eldest son, intended to support him until such time as he inherits the Crown. Other titles have continued to be granted to junior members of the royal family, but without associated grants of land directly connected with those titles, any territorial rights over the places named in the titles, or any income directly derived from those lands or places by virtue of those titles.

==== Scotland ====
The defunct Kingdom of Strathclyde was granted as an appanage to the future David I of Scotland by his brother Edgar, King of Scots. Remnants of this can be found within the patrimony of the Prince of Scotland, currently Prince William, Duke of Rothesay.

=== Kingdom of Jerusalem ===
In the only crusader state of equal rank in protocol to the states of Western Europe, the Kingdom of Jerusalem, the County of Jaffa and Ascalon was often granted as an appanage.

=== Brigantine Portugal ===
With the installation of the House of Braganza on the Portuguese throne in 1640, an official appanage was created for the second eldest son of the monarch, the House of the Infantado. The Infantado included several land grants and palaces, along with a heightened royal pension.

== Equivalents outside Western Europe ==
=== Russia ===
The Russian principalities had a similar practice; an appanage given to a younger male of the princely family was called an appanage principality (or udel). The frequency and importance of the custom was particularly important between the mid-13th and the mid-15th centuries; some historians refer to this era as the Appanage Period or Appanage Russia. The last appange Russian prince was Vladimir of Staritsa.

In the late Russian Empire, appanages for members of the imperial family were created by Emperor Paul I in 1797. By decree of the emperor, the members of the imperial family who were in the line of succession of the throne received civil list payments from state revenues; those not in the line of succession were given appanages from revenues of special estates called an appanage estate (udel estate; Russian: удельное имение; see ru:Удельное имение). Revenues of appanage estates were created by tribute of state (unlike private owned) peasants who lived on the territory of appanage estates and owned by the imperial family (see ru:Удельные крестьяне). Appanage estates were managed by the Department of Appanage Estates.

=== Serbia ===
In medieval Serbia, an appanage was predominantly given to a younger brother of the supreme ruler, called a Župa. Its use began in the 9th century and continued into the 14th century, with the fall of the Serbian Empire.

=== Indian subcontinent ===
In the Indian subcontinent, the jagir (a type of fief) was often thus assigned to individual junior relatives of the ruling house of a princely state, but not as a customary right of birth, though in practice usually hereditarily held, and not only to them but also to commoners, normally as an essentially meritocratic grant of land and taxation rights (guaranteeing a "fitting" income, in itself bringing social sway, in the primary way in a mainly agricultural society), or even as part of a deal.

The seniormost woman in the Travancore royal family held the estate of Attingal, also known as the Sreepadam Estate, in appanage for life. All the income derived from this 15,000 acres (61 km^{2}) estate was the private property of the senior maharani, alternatively known as the Senior Rani of Attingal (Attingal Mootha Thampuran).

=== Indonesia ===
The Javanese kingdom of Majapahit, which dominated eastern Java in the 14th and 15th centuries, was divided into nagara (provinces). The administration of these nagara was entrusted to members of the royal family, who bore the title of Bhre i.e. Bhra i, "lord of" (the word bhra being akin to the Thai Phra), followed by the name of the land they were entrusted with: for example a sister of King Hayam Wuruk (r. 1350–1389) was "Bhre Lasem", "lady of Lasem".

=== Mongol Empire ===
The royal family of the Mongol Empire owned the largest appanages in the world because of their enormous empire. In 1206, Genghis Khan awarded large tracts of land to his family members and loyal companions, most of whom were of common origin. Shares of loot were distributed much more widely. Empresses, princesses, and meritorious servants, as well as children of concubines, all received full shares including war prisoners. For example, Kublai summoned two siege engineers from the Ilkhanate, and after their success rewarded them with lands. After the Mongol conquest in 1238, the port cities in Crimea paid the Jochids customs duties and the revenues were divided among all Chingisid princes in Mongol Empire in accordance with the appanage system. As loyal allies, the Kublaids in East Asia and the Ilkhanids in Persia sent clerics, doctors, artisans, scholars, engineers and administrators to and received revenues from the appanages in each other's khanates.

The Great Khan Möngke divided up shares or appanages in Persia and made redistribution in Central Asia in 1251–1256. Although the Chagatai Khanate was the smallest in size, the Chagatai Khans held the cities of Kat and Khiva in Khorazm, and some cities and villages in Shanxi and Iran, as well as their nomadic grounds in Central Asia. The first Ilkhan, Hulagu, owned 25,000 households of silk-workers in China, valleys in Tibet, and lands in Mongolia. In 1298, his descendant Ghazan of Persia sent envoys with precious gifts to the Great Khan Temür, and asked for the share of lands and revenues held by his great-grandfather in the territories ruled by the Yuan dynasty (in modern-day China and Mongolia). It is claimed that Ghazan received revenues that were not sent since the time of Möngke Khan.

The appanage holders demanded excessive revenues and freed themselves from taxes. Ögedei decreed that nobles could appoint darughachi and judges in the appanages instead of direct distribution without the permission of the Great Khan, due to Khitan minister Yelü Chucai. Both Güyük and Möngke restricted the autonomy of the appanages, but Kublai Khan continued Ögedei's regulations. Ghazan also prohibited any misfeasance of appanage holders in the Ilkhanate, and Yuan councillor Temuder restricted Mongol nobles' excessive powers in appanages in China and Mongolia. Kublai's successor Temür abolished imperial son-in-law King Chungnyeol of Goryeo's 358 departments which caused financial pressures to Korean people, though the Mongols gave them some autonomy.

The appanage system was severely affected beginning with the civil strife in the Mongol Empire from 1260 to 1304. Nevertheless, this system survived. For example, Abagha of the Ilkhanate allowed Möngke Temür of the Golden Horde to collect revenues from silk workshops in northern Persia in 1270, and Baraq of the Chagatai Khanate sent his Muslim vizier to the Ilkhanate in 1269, ostensibly to investigate his appanages there. (The vizier's real mission was to spy on the Ilkhanids.) After a peace treaty declared among Mongol khans Temür, Duwa, Chapar, Tokhta and Oljeitu in 1304, the system began to see a recovery. During the reign of Tugh Temür, the Yuan court received a third of revenues of the cities of Transoxiana (Mawarannahr) under Chagatai Khans while Chagatai elites such as Eljigidey, Duwa Temür, Tarmashirin were given lavish presents and sharing in the Yuan Dynasty's patronage of Buddhist temples. Tugh Temür was also given some Russian captives by Chagatai prince Changshi as well as Kublai's future khatun Chabi had servant Ahmad Fanakati from Fergana Valley before her marriage. In 1326, the Golden Horde started sending tributes to Great Khans of the Yuan Dynasty again. By 1339, Ozbeg and his successors had received annually 24 thousand ding in paper currency from their Chinese appanages in Shanxi, Cheli and Hunan. H. H. Howorth noted that Ozbeg's envoy required his master's shares from the Yuan court, the headquarters of the Mongol world, for the establishment of new post stations in 1336. This communication ceased only with the breakup, succession struggles and rebellions of Mongol Khanates. (Note: The Ilkhanate broke up in 1335; the succession struggles of the Golden Horde and the Chagatai Khanate started in 1359 and 1340 respectively; the Yuan army fought against the Red Turban Rebellion since the 1350s.)

After the fall of the Mongol Empire in 1368, the Mongols continued the tradition of appanage system. They were divided into districts ruled by hereditary noblemen. The units in such systems were called Tumen and Otog during Northern Yuan Dynasty in Mongolia. However, the Oirats called their appanage unit ulus or anggi. Appanages were called banners (Khoshuu) under the Qing dynasty.

== See also ==
- Cadet branch
- Crown lands of France
- Secundogeniture
