= Gerold of Anglachgau =

Frankish count

Gerold
- Count in Kraichgau and Anglachgau
- Born: 725
- Died: about 784
- Family: Udalrichings
- Spouse: Emma of Alemannia
- Issue Detail: Eric of Friuli; Gerold; Hildegard of Swabia

Gerold I (c. 725 – 784) was the count of Kraichgau and Anglachgau. His daughter, Hildegard married King Charlemagne in 771.

== Life ==
Little is known about Gerold. He belonged to the Franconian imperial aristocracy. In 784, he and his wife made important donations to the newly founded abbey of Lorsch. These were estates in the vicinity of Worms and Heidelberg.

Some modern works describe Gerold as "count of Vinzgau". No such place existed, although the name may be derived from either Linzgau or Vinschgau.

== Marriage and issue ==
He was married before 754 to Emma (d. 789 or 798 or after 784), daughter of Hnabi, Duke of Alamannia. They had the following:

- Eric of Friuli
- Gerold
- Udalrich
- Hildegard, born in 754, married King Charlemagne in 771.
- Adrian, Count of Orléans, father of Odo I, Count of Orléans
- Peter, Abbot of Reichenau

Through Udalrich, Gerold is reckoned as the founder of the family of the Udalrichings.

== Sources ==
- Jackman, Donald C. (2007). Ius hereditarum Encountered I: The Meingaud-Walaho Inheritance. Editions Enlaplage.
- Lapidge, Michael (2017). Hilduin of Saint-Denis: The Passio S. Dionysii in Prose and Verse. Brill.
- Stoclet, Alain J. (2018). "Saint-Denis et les premiers Carolingiens: À propos d'une nouvelle édition des Passions d'Hilduin et de plusieurs textes apparentés ou satellites". Francia. 45: 193–209.
