= Ermentrude of Orléans =

Queen of West Francia from 843 to 869

Ermentrude
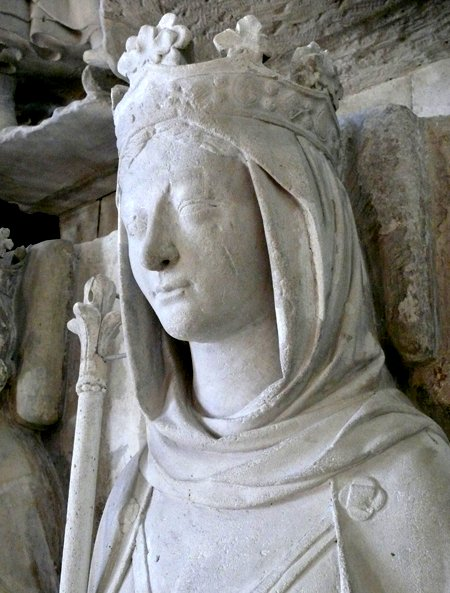
- Statue of Ermentrude at the Basilica of Saint-Denis

Queen consort of West Francia
- Tenure: 13 December 843 – 6 October 869
- Coronation: 25 August 866
- Born: 27 September 823
- Died: 6 October 869 (aged 46)
- Burial: Basilica of Saint-Denis, Paris, France
- Spouse: Charles II (m. 842)
- Issue among others...: Judith, Queen of Wessex and Countess of Flanders; Louis II of Western Francia; Charles I of Aquitaine; Carloman
- Dynasty: Udalriching
- Father: Odo I of Orléans
- Mother: Engeltrude de Fézensac

Ermentrude of Orléans (27 September 823 – 6 October 869) was the Queen of the Franks by her marriage to Charles II. She was the daughter of Odo, count of Orleans and Engeltrude de Fézensac.

== Queenship ==
The traditional historiography on queenship has created an image of a queen who a king's "helpmate" and provider of heirs. P. Stafford has examined queenship in a lot of depth, using Ermentrude's role in the Carolingian dynasty. They had power within the royal household and partially within the court. Their official duty was running the royal household smoothly, such as directing the children's education, supervising the staff and managing the private royal treasury. They unofficially acted as hostesses, ensuring the royal family was not involved in scandals and giving gifts to high-ranking officials in a society where this was important to maintain bonds. As a result, queens were expected to act as wise, loyal and chaste women.

In particular, Ermentrude was described by a contemporary, John Scotus Eriugena, as a 'strong woman' (femina fortis). 2 letters written in her name survive, a further 5 letters were addressed to her, and 12 charges issued by Charles II had her involved. In her free time, she showed a gift for embroidery.

== Consecration ==
In 866, Ermentrude was consecrated by the Archbishop Hincmar of Rheims during a politically turbulent time regarding his relationship with Charles II. It was the coronation of a wife rather than a bride, as she was crowned over 20 years after her wedding. According to Z. Mistry, the ordination shows two important ideas about Ermentrude and queenship in general: a) dynastic security b) how to be a good wife to a king.

Throughout the ordination, Ermentrude is repeatedly compared to Sarah from the Bible, and Zubin Mistry concludes that this is an attempt from Hincmar and Charles II to bless the Carolingian dynasty with more heirs through Ermentrude. This is because Sarah struggled to have children until she reaffirmed her faith, showing that fertility and dynastic survival was entwined with devout faith. Fittingly, Ermentrude had an interest in religious foundations and associations with several convents, including Chelles and Avenay.

Zubin Mistry points out that Hincmar also developed an ideology for the behaviour of queens in his ordination and other works. He expected Ermentrude to be ‘loveable like Rachel, wise like Rebecca, loyal like Sarah.’ This list for how to be a good queen was common in Carolingian times, as Eriugena praised Ermentrude for her chastity, piety, and constant prayer, all virtues reminiscent of biblical women.

== Issue ==
Ermentrude of Orléans and Charles II, also known as "The Bald", married in 842. Their children were:

- Judith (844–870 or later), Queen of Wessex by her marriages with Kings Æthelwulf and Æthelbald, Countess of Flanders by her marriage with Margrave Baldwin I
- Louis II of West Francia, also known as "The Stammerer" (846–879)
- Charles I of Aquitaine, also known as "The Child" (847–866)
- Lothar (848–865), monk in 861, became Abbot of Saint-Germain
- Carloman (849–877)
- Rotrud (852–912), a nun
- Ermentrud (854–877), a nun
- Hildegard (856–c. 860), died young
- Gisela (857–874)
- Godehilde (864–907), a nun

== Sources ==
- Jackman, Donald C. (2015). Three Bernards Sent South to Govern II: Counties of the Guilhemid Consanguinity. Editions Enlaplage.
- McKitterick, Rosamond (2018). The Frankish Kingdoms Under the Carolingians 751-987. Routledge.
- Mistry, Zubin, 'Ermentrude's Consecration (866): Queen-making rites and biblical templates for Carolingian fertility' Early Medieval Europe 27 (2019), pp. 567-588.
- Nelson, Janet, Politics and Ritual in Early Medieval Europe (London, 1986).
- Stafford, Paul, Queens, Concubines and Dowagers: The King's Wife in the Early Middle Ages (London, 1983).
- Stone, Rachel and West, Charles (eds.), Hincmar of Rheims: Life and Work (Manchester, 2015).

Royal titles
| Preceded by Judith of Bavaria; First following the Treaty of Verdun | Queen of Western Francia; 843–869 | Succeeded by Richilde of Provence |
