= Engeltrude de Fézensac =

French Countess

- Countess of Orléans
- Born: c. 799
- Died: 853
- Buried: Basilique Saint-Denis
- Noble family: Girard (by birth); Udalriching (by marriage)
- Spouse: Odo I, Count of Orléans
- Issue: Ermentrude, Queen of West Francia
- Father: Leuthard I of Paris
- Mother: Grimhilda

Engeltrude de Fézensac (also Ingeltrud, Ingeltrude, or Ingeltrudis Fidentiacus in contemporary Latin; c. 799 – 853) was the Countess of Orléans via her marriage in 825 to Odo I, Count of Orléans. Their eldest daughter, Ermentrude, married Charles the Bald of West Francia. They also had a son, William, who was executed by his own brother-in-law in 866.

Engeltrude was the only daughter of Leuthard I of Paris and his wife, Grimhilda (also known as Grimeut d'Alsace); her brothers were Adalard the Seneschal and Girart de Roussillon.
