= Odo of Orléans =

French count

Odo
- Count of Orléans
- Tenure: c. 810–818, 828–830, 831–834
- Predecessor: Adrian
- Successor: Matfrid
- Born: c. 790
- Died: 25 May 834
- Noble family: Udalriching
- Spouse: Engeltrude de Fézensac
- Issue: Ermentrude, Queen of West Francia
- Father: Adrian, Count of Orléans
- Mother: Waldrada of Autun

Odo (French: Eudes; also Hodo, Uodo, or Udo in contemporary Latin; died 25 May 834) was the Count of Orléans (comes Aurelianensium) following the final deposition of Matfrid until his own deposition a few years later.

He belonged to the Udalriching family and was a son of Adrian, who had also held the county of Orléans, and possibly of Waldrada, a Nibelungid. In 811, as count (comes), according to the Annales Fuldenses, he signed a peace treaty with the Vikings.

According to the Vita Hludowici, in 827, he was named to replace the deposed Matfrid in Orléans. Odo, along with Heribert, son of William of Gellone, a relative, possibly his cousin, were exiled in April 830 by Lothair I and Orléans was confiscated. Matfrid was reinstated.

In 834, while fighting Matfrid and Lambert I of Nantes, partisans of Lothair, Odo was killed as were his brothers William, Guy of Maine, and Theodo, abbot of Saint Martin of Tours. (Note: This translation mentions Odo's and Theodo's deaths on pages 47-48.)

Odo's wife was Engeltrude de Fézensac. Their eldest daughter, Ermentrude, married Charles the Bald of West Francia. He left a son William who was executed by his own brother-in-law in 866.

== Sources ==
- Jackman, Donald C. (2015). Three Bernards Sent South to Govern II: Counties of the Guilhemid Consanguinity. Editions Enlaplage.
- Le Jan, Régine (2003). Famille et pouvoir dans le monde franc (VIIe-Xe siècle) (in French). Publications de la Sorbonne.
- McKitterick, Rosamond (2018). The Frankish Kingdoms Under the Carolingians 751-987. Routledge.
- Nithard (2022). Conti, Maro (ed.). Histories. Translated by Conti, Marco. Peeters.
