= Louis of Valois (1549–1550) =

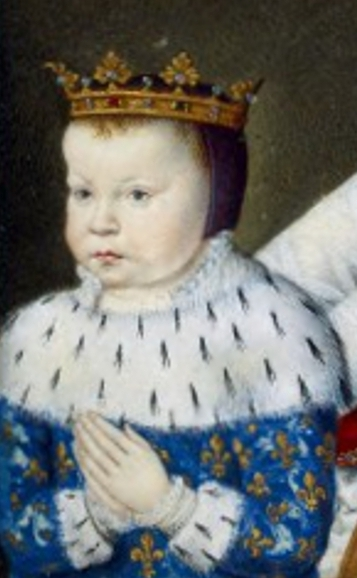
- Depiction in Catherine de' Medici's Book of Hours

Duke of Orléans
- Tenure: 3 February 1549 – 24 October 1550
- Predecessor: Charles II
- Successor: Charles III
- Born: 3 February 1549; Fontainebleau, Paris
- Died: 24 October 1550 (age 1 year 8 months); Mantes-la-Jolie
- Burial: Basilica of St Denis
- House: Valois-Angoulême
- Father: Henry II of France
- Mother: Catherine de' Medici

Louis of France (3 February 1549 – 24 October 1550), also known as Louis, Duke of Orléans was the second son and fourth child of Henry II (31 March 1519 – 10 July 1559), King of France and his wife, Catherine de' Medici, daughter of Lorenzo II de' Medici, Duke of Urbino and his wife Madeleine de La Tour d'Auvergne. He died aged 1 year and 8 months.

== Life ==
After Henry II and Catherine de' Medici were married, several years passed without the birth of any children. Though various remedies were tried, none proved to be effective. According to court sources, the royal couple then turned to the court physician Fernel for help in conceiving.

Louis was born on 3 February 1549 at the Palace of Fontainebleau, the couple's second son and fourth child. From birth he was second in line to the throne and endowed with the duchy of Orléans. He was raised under the supervision of the governor and governess of the royal children, Jean d'Humières and Françoise d'Humières, under the orders of Diane de Poitiers, and reportedly shared the same nursery with his brother and sister Francis and Elisabeth, and later with his brother Charles. Louis was present when five-year-old Mary, Queen of Scots arrived at Henry II's court to be raised as the intended bride and queen of Francis, the future king of France and king consort of Scots. There are reports that Henry II and Catherine planned for Louis to one day become the Duke of Urbino, a title which belonged exclusively to the Medici family.

== Death ==
=== Freer's account ===
Martha Walker Freer gives the year of Louis's death as 1549.

According to Freer, the infant Duke of Orléans was given a christening of "extraordinary splendour" in St. Germain-en-Laye in 1549. However, a few days after the ceremony, Louis died from the effects of a chill caught while being handed from one state functionary to another.

=== Other accounts ===
Other accounts dismiss Freer's, stating that Louis died in 1550, one even giving a date for his baptism, 19 May 1549 and listing his godparents as John III of Portugal, Mary of Guise and Ercole II d'Este, Duke of Ferrara.

== In fiction ==
He is briefly mentioned in the novels Madame Serpent and The Captive Queen, both by Jean Plaidy.

== Sources ==
- Livre d’Heures de Catherine de Medicis 1556. Reproduced by kind permission of Bibliothèque Nationale Paris, Département de Manuscrits, B.N. n.a.l. 82) (nouvelles acquisitions latines).
- Anselme de Sainte-Marie, Père (1726). Histoire généalogique et chronologique de la maison royale de France [Genealogical and chronological history of the royal house of France] (in French). Vol. 1 (3rd ed.). Paris: La compagnie des libraires.
- Freer, Martha Walker (1858). Henry III, King of France and Poland. Hurst and Blackett.
- Tomas, Natalie R. (2003). The Medici Women: Gender and Power in Renaissance Florence. Aldershot, UK: Ashgate. ISBN 0-7546-0777-1.
- Whale, Winifred Stephens (1914). The La Trémoille family. Boston, Houghton Mifflin. p. 43.

Louis of Valois (1549–1550) House of Valois, Angoulême branch Cadet branch of the Capetian dynasty Born: 3 February 1549 Died: 24 October 1550
French nobility
Preceded by Charles II	Duke of Orléans as 'Louis III'; 3 February 1549 – 24 October 1550	Succeeded by Charles III
