= Château of Blois =

French Renaissance style château

Coordinates: 47.585501°N 1.33095°E

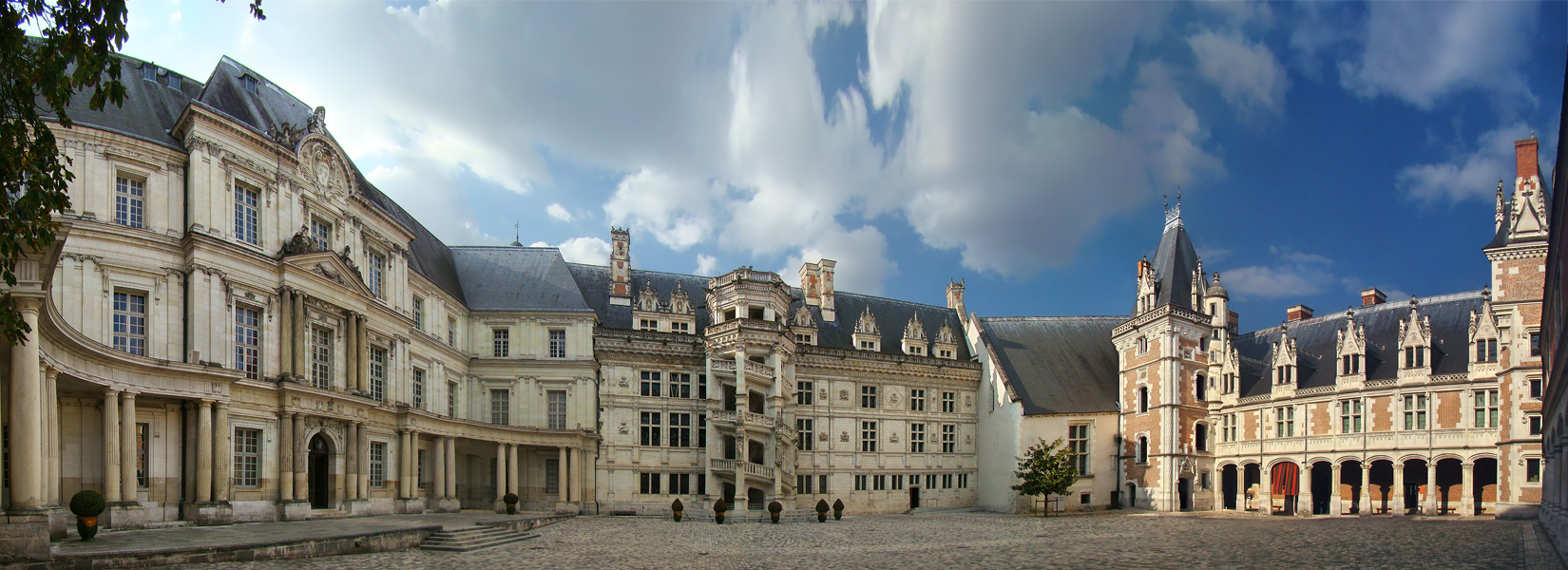
Interior façades in Classic, Renaissance, and Gothic styles (from left to right)

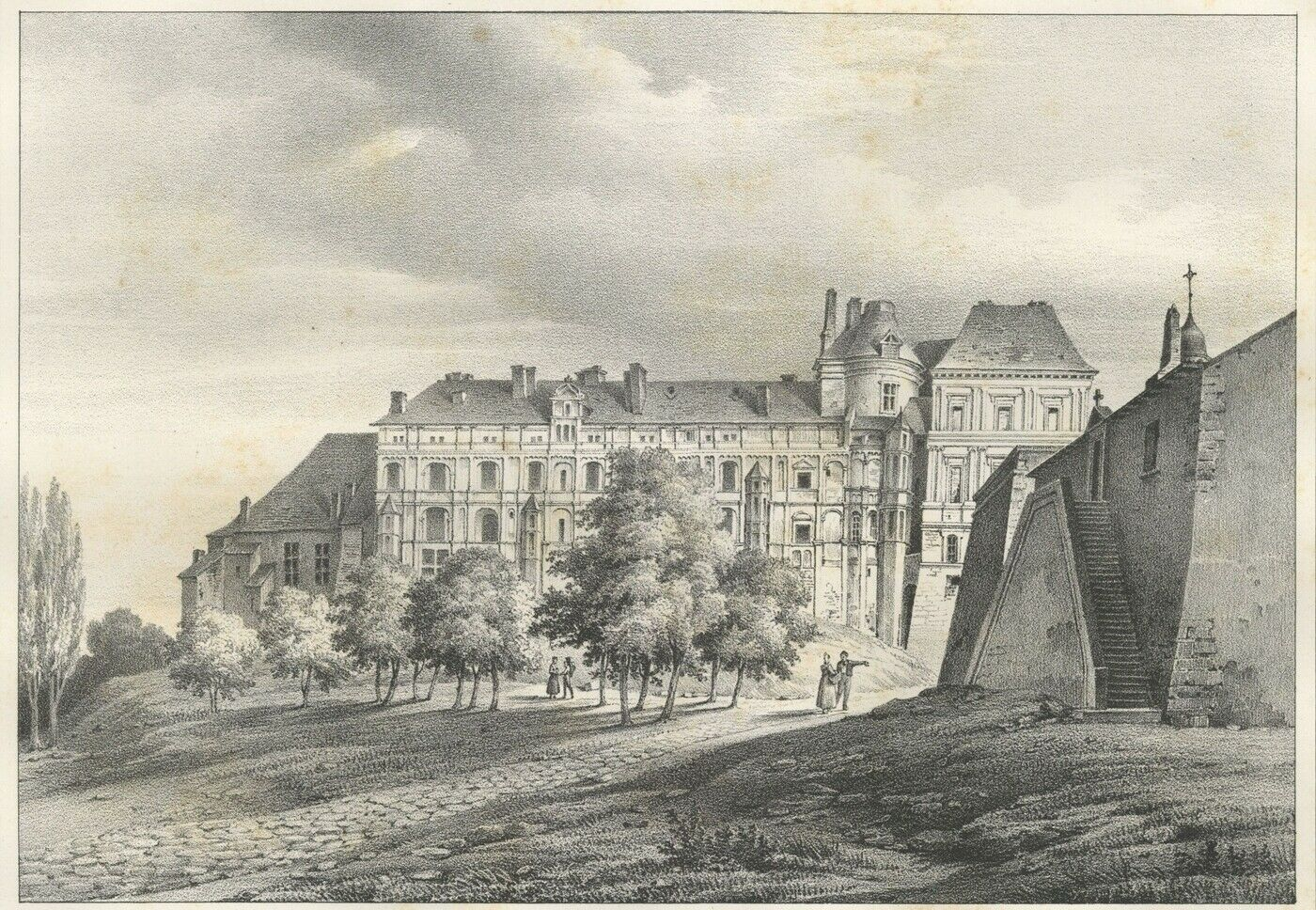
Château de Blois, lithograph by C. Molle from a drawing by Charles-Caïus Renoux

The Royal Château of Blois (French: Château Royal de Blois, pronounced [ʃɑto ʁwajal də blwa]) is a château located in the city center of Blois, Loir-et-Cher, in the Loire Valley, France. In addition to having been the residence of the Counts of Blois and some French kings, Joan of Arc also went there by 1429 to be blessed by the Archbishop of Reims before departing with her army to drive out the English, who conquered Orléans the previous year.

The château effectively controlled the County of Blois up to 1397, then the Duchy of Orléans, and the Kingdom of France between 1498 and 1544. It comprises several buildings, whose construction began in the 13th century and ended in the 17th century. Four different architectural styles are represented within the rectangular edifice, including: some remains of the 13th-century medieval fortress, the Louis XII Gothic-style wing, the Francis I Renaissance-style wing, and the Gaston of Orléans Classical-style wing.

The Musée des Beaux-Arts de Blois (Museum of Fine Arts of Blois), located in the Louis XII wing, presents collections of painting, sculpture, and decorative arts (including numerous tapestries) dating from the 16th to the 19th century. It was created in 1850.

== History ==
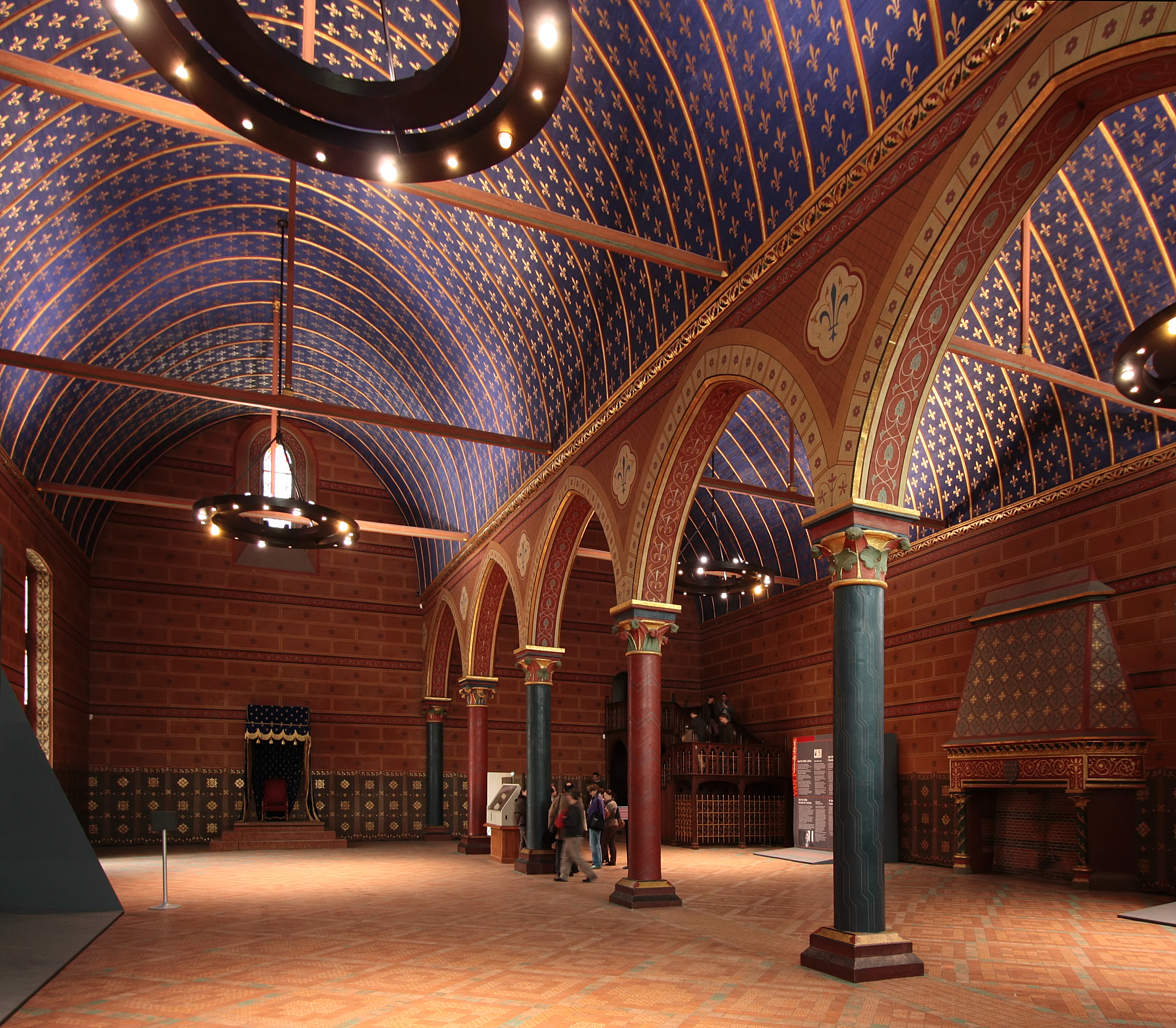
Interior of the Estates General Room

=== Counts of Blois ===
In 854, the Blois castle, known as Blisum castrum, it was attacked by the Viking cheftain Hastein. Over the course of the 10th and 11th centuries, the Counts of Blois, who also owned Chartres and Champagne, rebuilt the fortress. Count Theobald I raised a so-called "big tower" and by the end of the 12th century, the Counts' contributions were finished by building the St-Sauveur Collegiate Church.

The "Estates General Room" (Salle des États Généraux in French), built at the beginning of the 13th century, is one of the oldest seignoral rooms preserved in France, and is also the largest remaining secular non-military Gothic room in the country. This room was used as a court of justice by the Counts of Blois and again in 1576 and 1588 during sessions of the Estates General.

=== Transition to the House of Orléans ===
The medieval castle was given in 1397 to Louis I, Duke of Orléans, brother of Charles VI. After Louis' assassination, his widow, Valentina Visconti, retired to the Blois Castle. It was later inherited by their son, Charles d'Orléans the poet, who was captured at the Battle of Agincourt and imprisoned in England. After 25 years as a hostage in England, Charles d'Orleans returned to his beloved Blois and partly helped rebuild the château as a more commodious dwelling. It became the favourite royal residence and the kingdom's political capital under Charles' son, when Count Louis II became King Louis XII of France in 1498.

=== King Louis XII ===
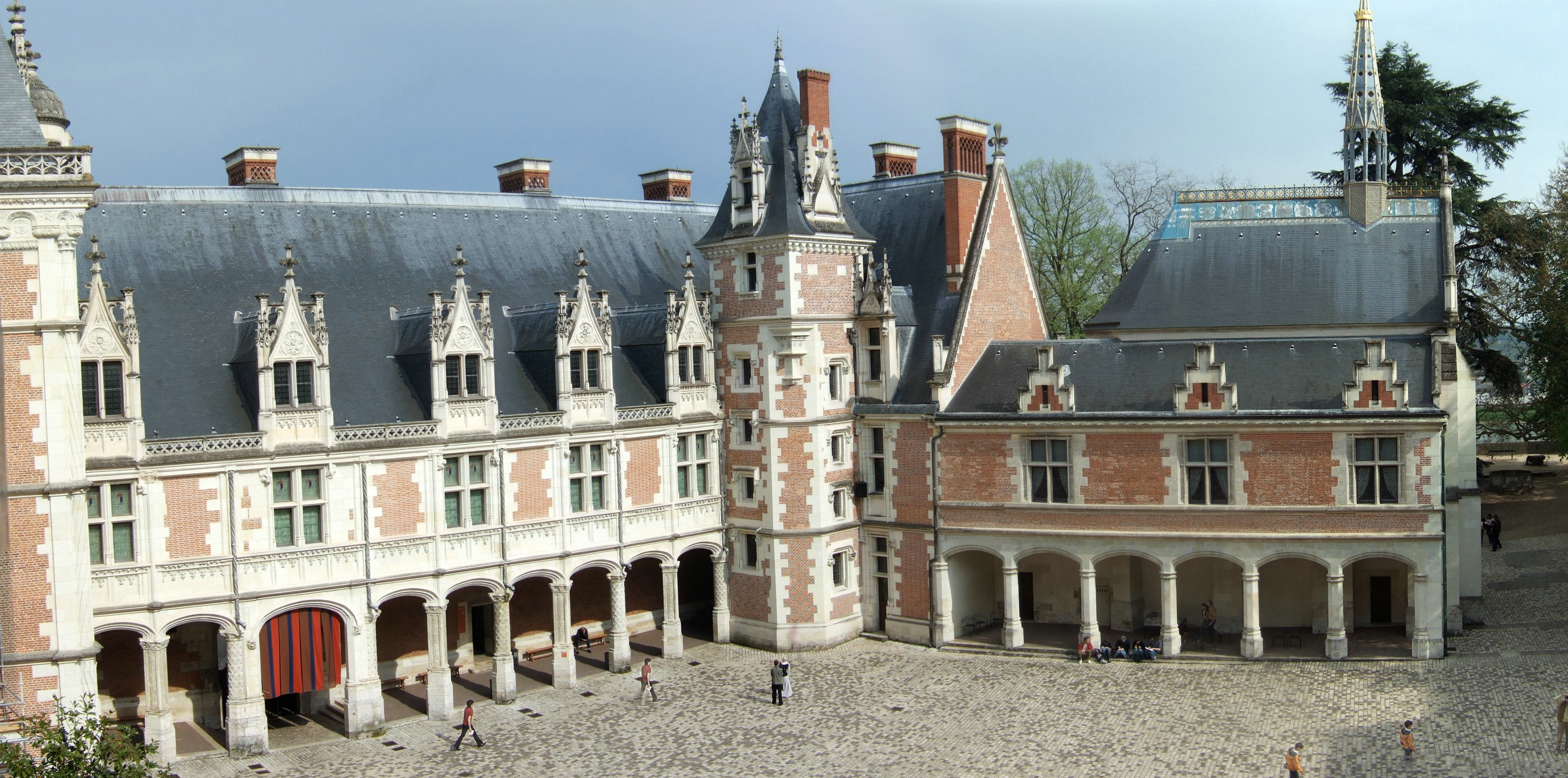
The exterior of the Louis XII wing, with the chapel to the right

At the beginning of the 16th century, King Louis XII initiated a reconstruction of the entrance of the main block and the creation of an Italian garden in terraced parterres where Victor Hugo Square stands today.

This wing, of red brick and grey stone, forms the main entrance to the château proper, and features a statue of the king on horseback above the entrance. Although the style is principally Gothic, as the profiles of mouldings, the lobed arches and the pinnacles attest, there are elements of Renaissance architecture present, such as a small chandelier.

=== King Francis I ===
When Francis I became king in 1515, his wife Queen Claude had him refurbish Blois with the intention of moving from the Château d'Amboise to Blois. Francis initiated the construction of a new wing and created one of the period's most important libraries in the castle. After the death of his wife in 1524, he spent very little time at Blois and the massive library was moved to the royal Palace of Fontainebleau. It is this library that formed the royal library and the backbone of the Bibliothèque nationale de France.

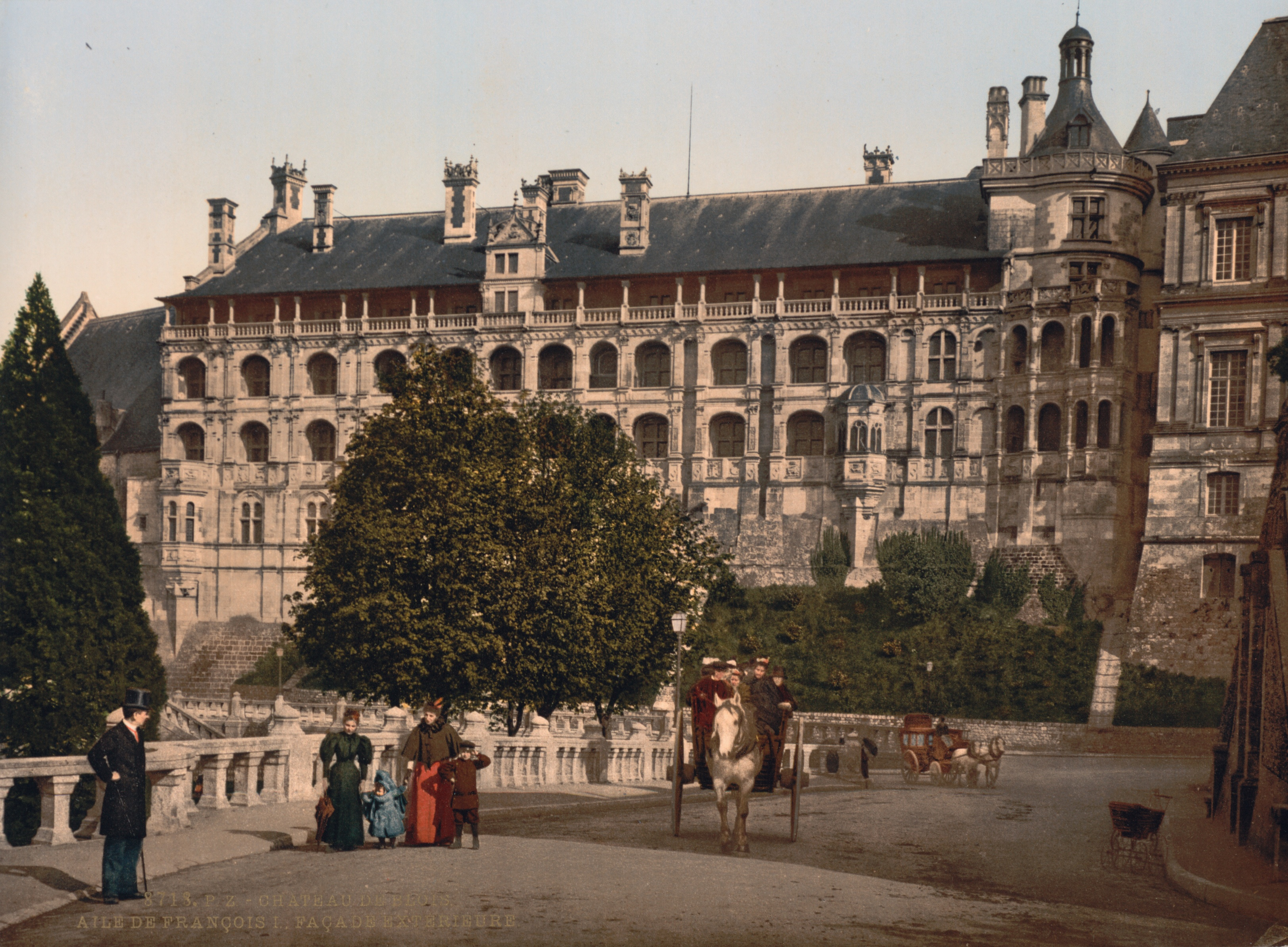
The rear of the Francis I wing, facing over central Blois in the 1890s

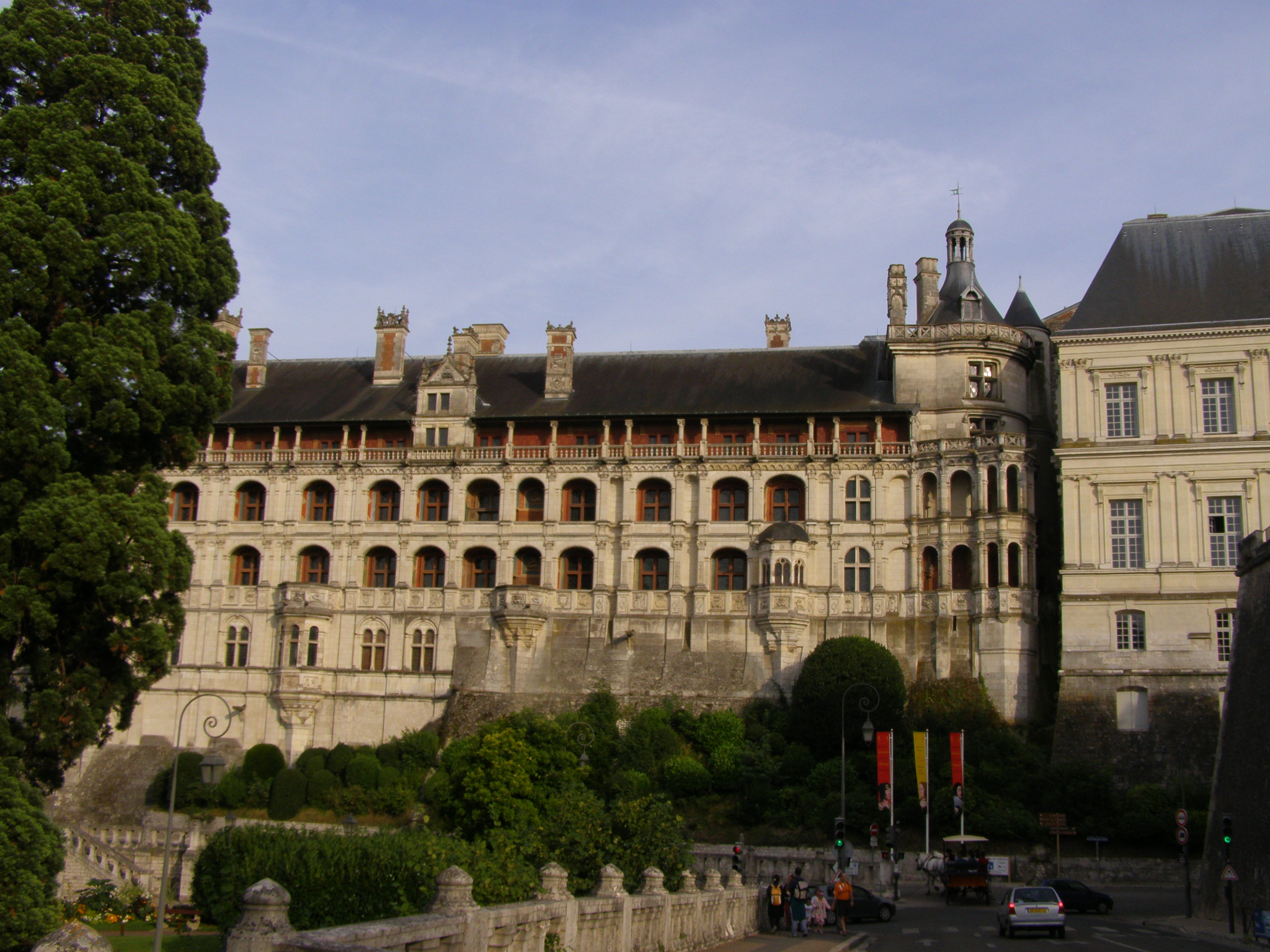
The rear of the wing in 2007

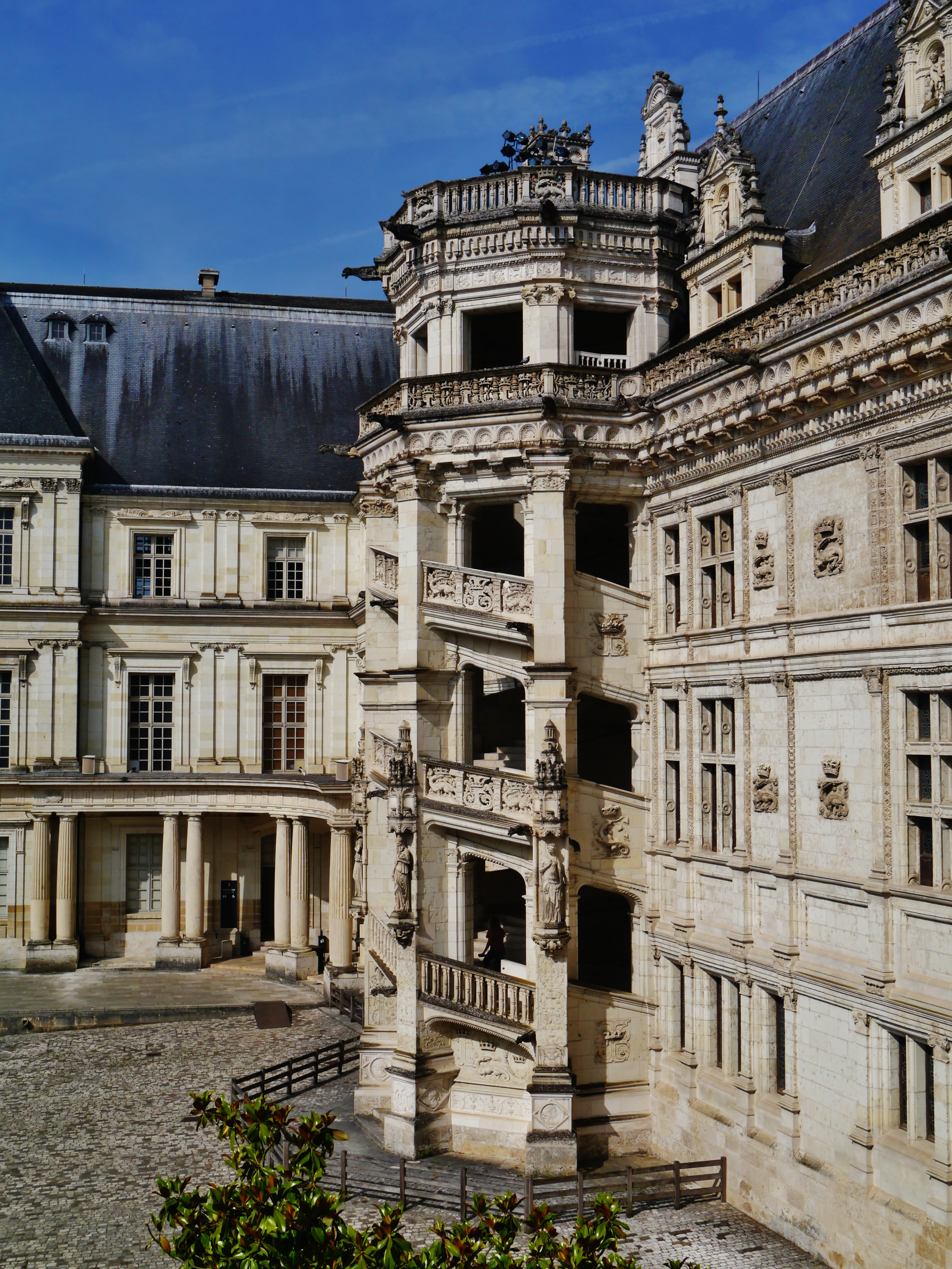
The château's most renowned feature, the spiral staircase in the Francis I wing

Since King Louis XII was very committed in the Italian Wars, which imported the Renaissance movement into Blois, this wing's architecture and ornamentation are marked by Italian influence. In the middle, there is the monumental spiral staircase, covered with fine bas-relief sculptures and looking out onto the château's central court. These monumental staircases served as a draft for those of the Château de Chambord, built a few years later. Behind this wing is the "Lodges Façade" (Façade des Loges in French), characterised by a series of disconnected niches.

=== King Henry III ===
Driven from Paris during the French Wars of Religion, King Henry III took refuge in Blois, and summoned the Estates General meetings there in 1576 and 1588. On 23 December 1588, the King's arch-enemy from the Day of the Barricades, Henry I, Duke of Guise, was assassinated by the King's bodyguard. The following day, the King also had the Duke's brother, Louis II, Cardinal of Guise, murdered within the château.

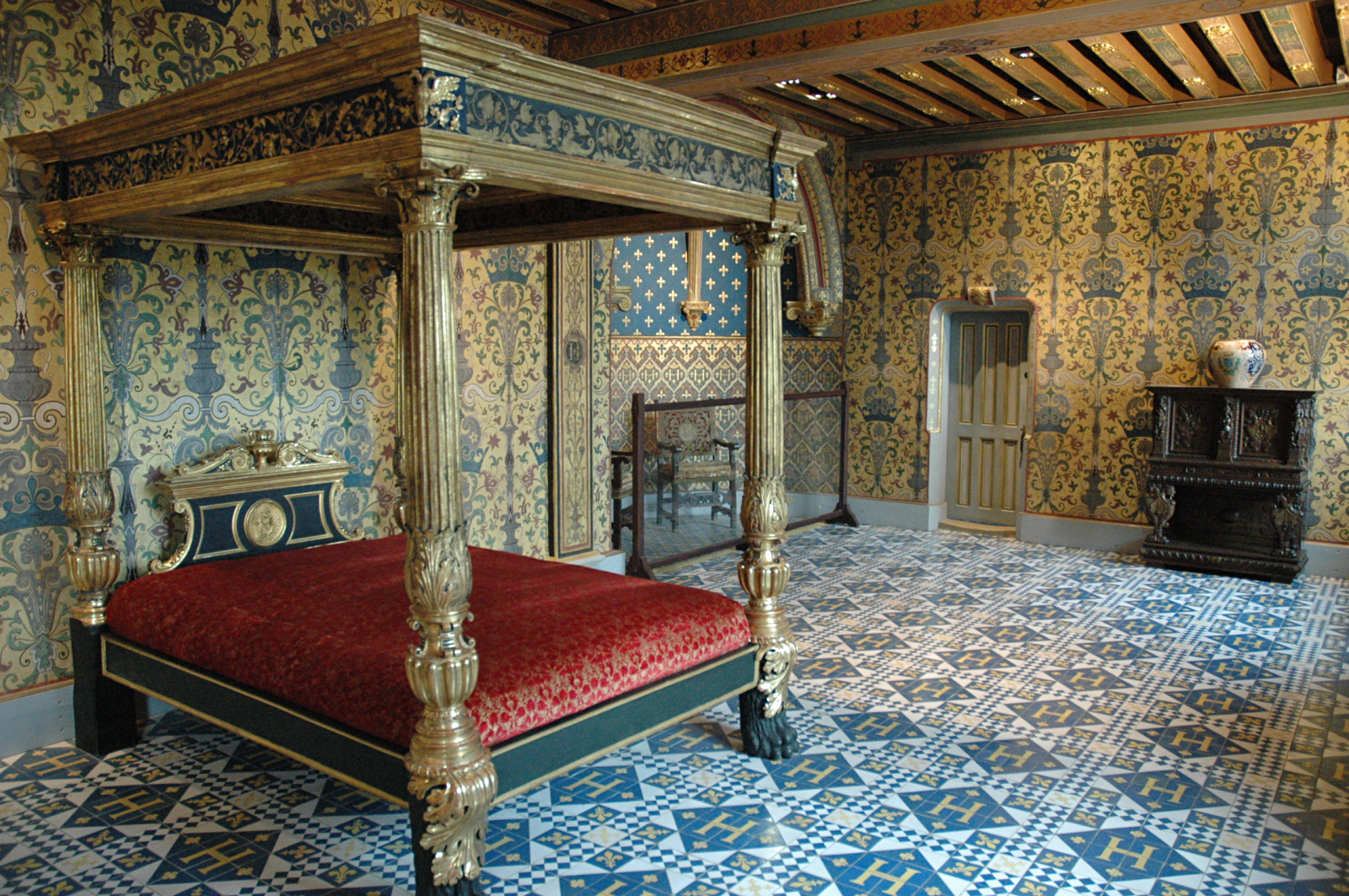
The "King's Chamber" with King Henry IV's H in the floor tiles

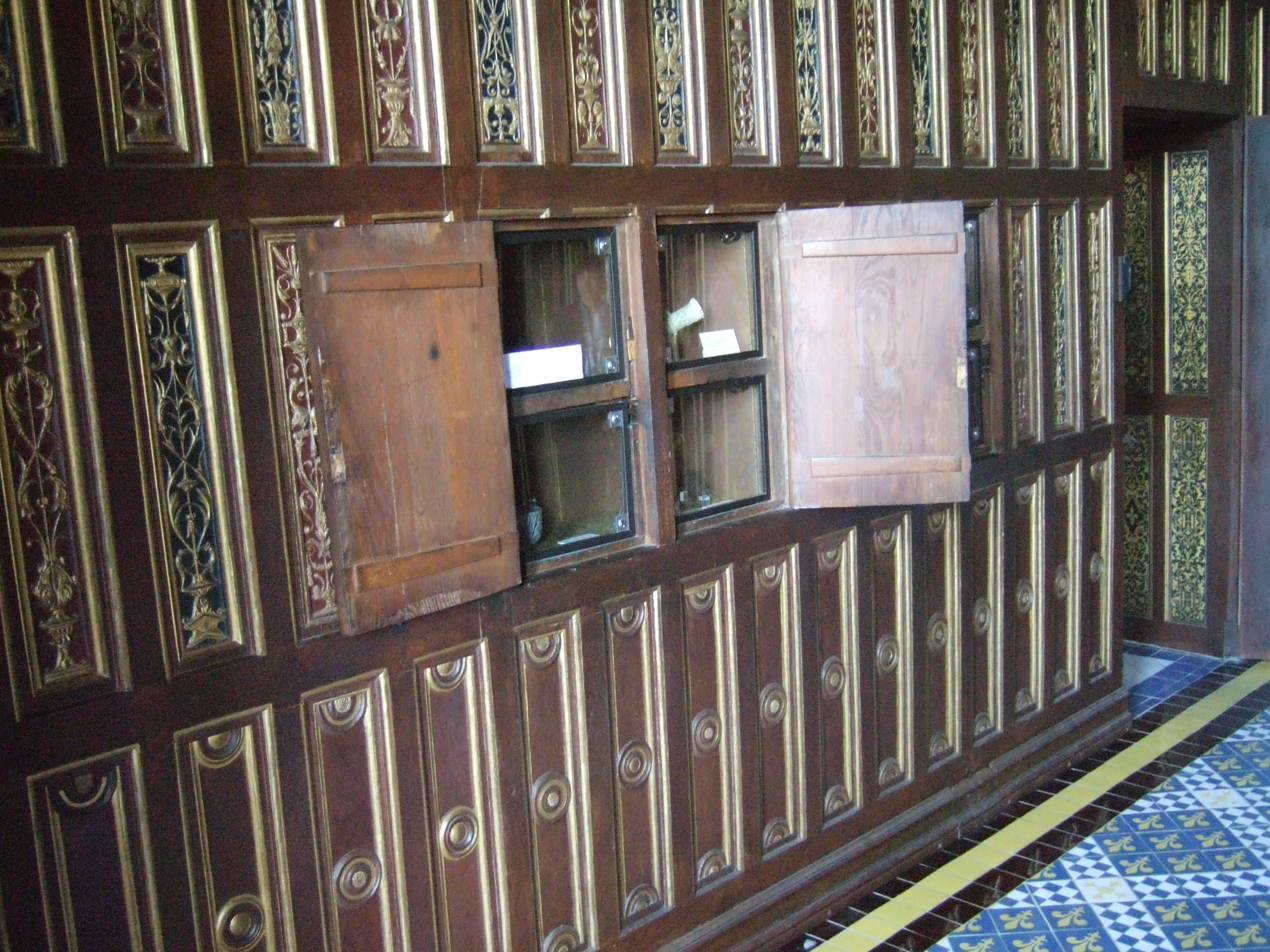
The "Chamber of Secrets", allegedly believed to be Catherine de' Medici's secret hiding place for poisons

=== King Henry IV ===
After this, the castle was occupied by King Henry IV, the first Bourbon monarch. On Henry's death in 1610, it became the place of exile for his widow, Marie de' Medici, when she was expelled from the court of her son, King Louis XIII.

=== Duke Gaston of Orléans ===
In 1626, King Louis XIII gave the county and the Château of Blois to his brother and heir, Gaston, Duke of Orléans as a wedding gift. In 1634, Gaston embarked on building a completely new wing to the château. The task of developing this new castle was given to François Mansart. The rear of the courtyard is where Mansart began this ambitious building project with a main dwelling house. This house should have been the first building in a large-scale reconstruction project. The project was stopped in 1638 when Gaston's nephew was born, the future Louis XIV. With Louis XIV's birth, Gaston was no longer the heir and no longer eligible for financing.

This wing makes up the rear wall of the court, directly opposite the Louis XII wing. The central section is composed of three horizontal layers where the superposition of Doric, Ionic and Corinthian orders can be seen.

By the time of the French Revolution, the immense castle had been neglected for more than 130 years. The contents, many of its statues, royal emblems and coats of arms of the palace were removed. In a state of near-total disrepair, the Château of Blois was scheduled to be demolished but was given a reprieve as a military barracks.

=== Preservation as a monument ===
In 1840, the initiative of Prosper Mérimée placed the château on the list of historical monuments. This allowed state funds to be used in the preservation. It was restored under the direction of the architect Félix Duban.

The château is maintained and owned by the town of Blois and has been opened to the public as a museum and tourist attraction. On view for visitors are the supposed poison cabinets of Catherine de' Medici. Most likely this room, the "Chamber of Secrets", had a much more banal purpose: exhibiting precious objects for guests.

== People linked to the Château ==
=== People born in the Château ===
The following individuals were born inside the Château:

- Charles of Blois (in 1319);
- Louis XII (in 1462), King of France between 1498 and 1515;
- Marguerite Louise d'Orléans (in 1645), daughter of Gaston, Duke of Orléans.

=== People who died in the Château ===
The following individuals died within the château:

- Anne of Brittany (in 1514), last Duchess of Brittany, married Louis XII in 1499;
- Claude of France (in 1524), daughter of King Louis XII and Queen Anne of Brittany, married Francis I;
- Henry I of Guise (in 1588), 3rd Duke of Guise, assassinated after his participation to the Day of the Barricades;
- Louis II of Guise (in 1588), Duke of Guise's brother;
- Catherine de' Medici (in 1589), wife of King Henry II, was exiled in Blois by her son, King Henry III;
- Gaston, Duke of Orléans (in 1660), son of King Henry IV and last Count of Blois.

== See also ==
- Châteaux of the Loire Valley
- Gardens of the French Renaissance
- List of castles in France
