= Hôtel Saint-Pol =

Former royal residence in Paris, France

Coordinates: 48°51′15″N 2°21′44″E

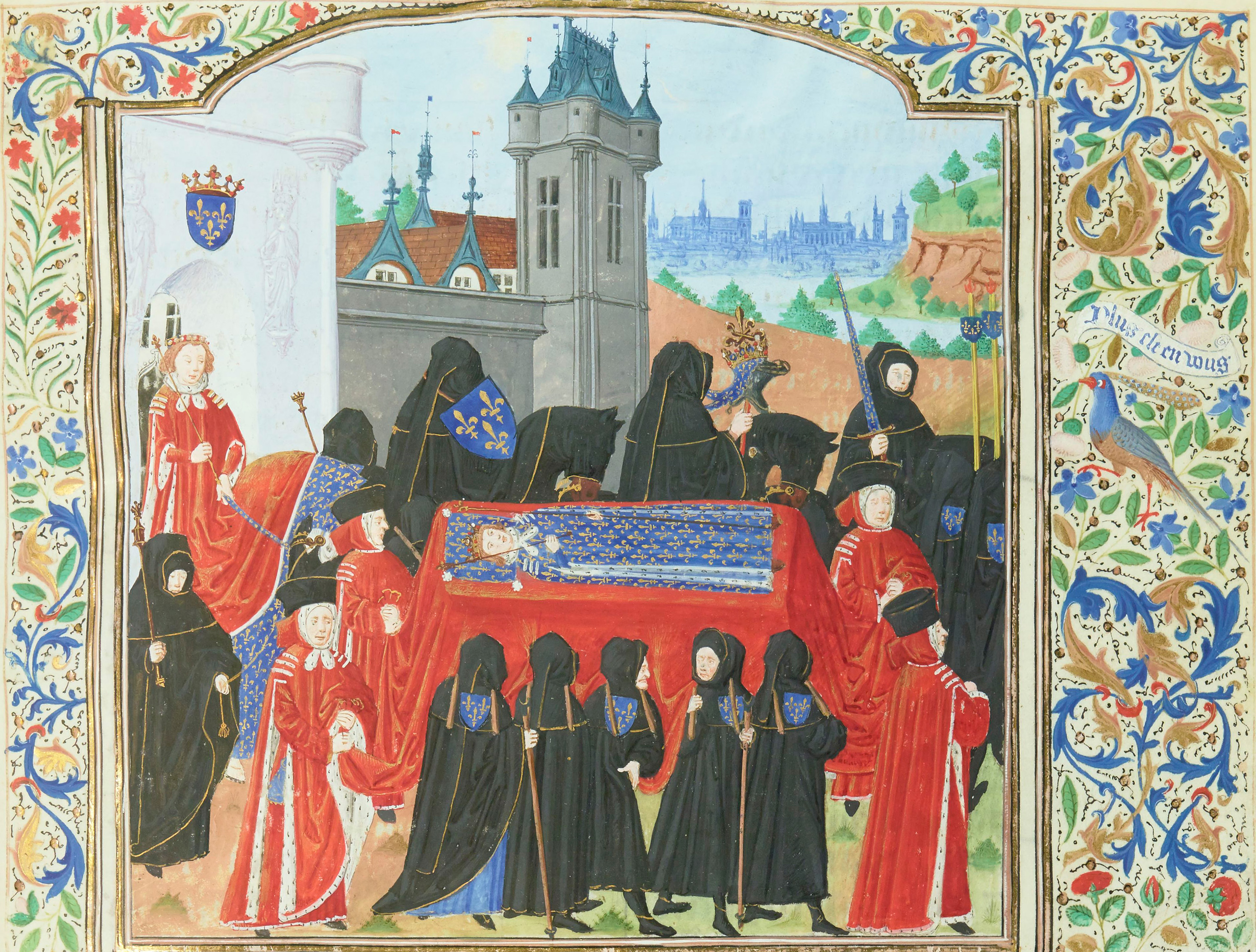
Funeral cortège of Charles VI (or Charles VII) leaving the Hôtel Saint-Pol, miniature in the Chronique (15th century) of Jean Chartier (Bibliothèque Nationale de France)

The Hôtel Saint-Pol (French pronunciation: [otɛl sɛ̃ pɔl]) was a royal residence begun in 1360 by Charles V of France on the ruins of a building constructed by Louis IX. It was used by Charles V and Charles VI. Located on the Right Bank, to the northwest of the Quartier de l'Arsenal in the 4th arrondissement of Paris, the residence's grounds stretched from the Quai des Célestins to the Rue Saint-Antoine, and from the Rue Saint-Paul to the Rue du Petit-Musc. It fell into disuse and ruin after the death of Isabeau de Bavière in 1435 and was demolished after Francis I of France sold it in parts at auction in 1543. The area around the Hôtel Saint-Pol is now the Marais neighborhood of Paris.

== History ==
In 1360 Charles V began constructing Hôtel Saint-Pol from the Hôtel du Petit-Musc, purchased in 1318 by Louis of Bourbon, a grandson of Louis IX. From then until 1364, Charles continued to improve and develop it by acquiring additional property, including the newer Hôtel d'Étampes in 1361, and ordering the construction of new buildings. The King, who could not stand the pestilential odours of Paris and the problems they caused his health, appreciated its location outside the medieval city. He valued the residence for its calm and its cleaner environment, which he claimed had helped him avoid illnesses, and more importantly recover good health.

On 28 January 1393, the Bal des Ardents took place at the Hôtel Saint-Pol. Four noble dancers caught fire and were burned to death, while Charles VI and another dancer barely escaped the flames.

== Expansion of the park of the Hôtel Saint-Pol ==
The Hôtel Saint-Pol was not a single building, but consisted of three important dwellings making up the royal residence: one dwelling for the King, one for the Queen (the former Hôtel d'Étampes), one for their children (the former Hôtel des Abbés de Saint-Maur). All had rooms for banquets and entertainments given by the King, and rooms for guests. Charles V had the residence luxuriously decorated according to his personal tastes, with precious woods, paintings, and goldwork. Walls were decorated with hangings embroidered with pearls, and books were displayed on the furniture, along with golden ornaments. Two chapels were built in the residence, one for the King, the other for his consort, Joanna of Bourbon. The hôtel included a remarkable collection of precious books that the King enjoyed assembling, including those of his father, John II, who had also been a great lover of books. This collection allowed Charles V to create the Royal Library, which would later become the Bibliothèque nationale de France, France's national library in Paris. Within his own residence, Charles V included a room for the Conseil du Roi where affairs of state were conducted.

== Etiquette ==
The Hôtel Saint-Pol and other palaces were the sites where the first versions of a royal etiquette at the French court were developed. Charles V, for instance, had his servants dressed in liveries appropriate to the stature of a king of France.

== The Hôtel Saint-Pol in the 15th and 16th centuries ==
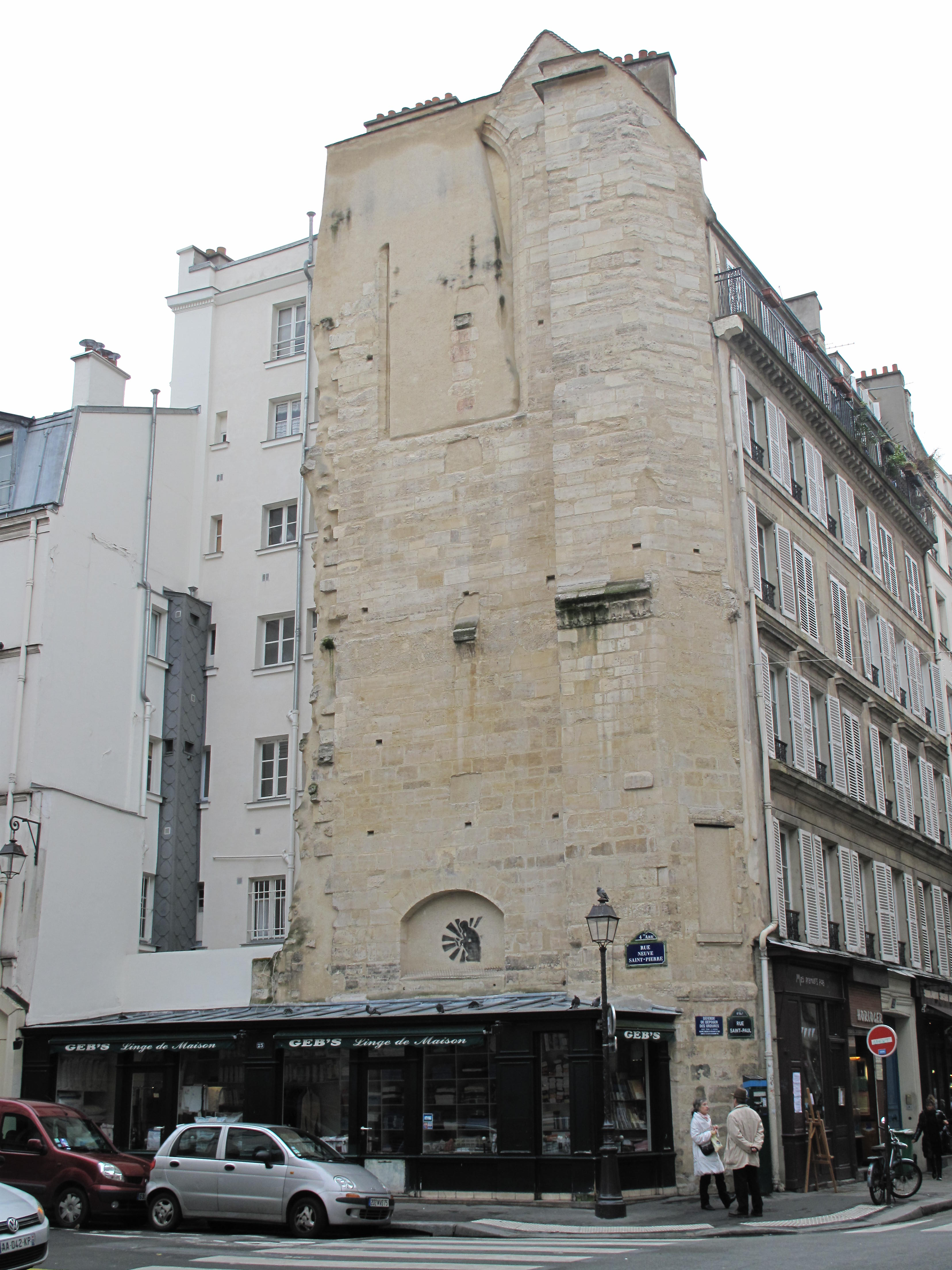
Remains of the Saint-Paul church

After Charles VII fled to Bourges in 1418, the Hôtel Saint-Pol was abandoned by Charles and his successors. Louis XI preferred the Château de Plessis-lez-Tours, and when visiting Paris stayed at the Château de Vincennes. Charles VIII, Louis XII, and Francis I lived in the Loire Valley or at the Château de Fontainebleau, and the Hôtel Saint-Pol fell into ruin. In 1519, part of it was sold by order of Francis I, and several years later, it was completely demolished. A wall of the church of Saint-Paul, which formed part of the hôtel, survives to this day.

== Bibliography ==
- Bordonove, Georges (1988). Les Rois qui ont fait la France - Les Valois - Charles V le Sage, vol. 1, éditions Pygmalion. ISBN 9782857041856.
- Emery, Anthony (2016). Seats of Power in Europe during the Hundred Years War: An Architectural Study from 1330 to 1480. Oxford: Oxbow Books. ISBN 9781785701030.
- Lorentz, Philippe; Dany Sandron (2006). Atlas de Paris au Moyen Âge. Paris: Parigramme. ISBN 9782840964025.
