= County of Orléans =

Area of early medieval France

The County of Orléans was an area of early medieval France including the city of Orléans and its countryside. It was governed by a count.

When Hugh Capet became King of France, the county of Orléans became a part of the royal domain. The lands formed part of the appanages granted to various younger sons of Kings of France with the title Duke of Orléans.

== Merovingian counts of Orléans ==
- Willachar, father-in-law of Chramn son of King Chlothar I

== Carolingian counts of Orléans ==
- Adrian (?-c.810)
- Odo I (c.810-818, 828-830, 831-834)
- Matfrid (818-828, 830-831)
- William (834–c.860)
- Robert I the Strong (c.860–866)
- Hugh the Abbot (866–886)
- Odo II (886–888)
- Robert II (888–923)
- Hugh the Great (923–956)
- Hugh Capet (956–987)

== Capetian counts of Orléans ==
- Philippe of France, elder son and heir of Saint Louis (later Philip III of France)

== See also ==
- Countess of Orléans
- Duke of Orléans
- Orleanist
- Legitimist
