= Adrian, Count of Orléans =

Frankish count (c. 755 – before 821)

Adrian of Orléans
- Count of Orléans
- Born: c. 755
- Died: before November 821
- Noble family: Udalriching
- Spouse: Waldrada of Autun
- Issue: Odo I Waldrada; William
- Father: Gerold of Anglachgau
- Mother: Emma of Alemannia

Adrian of Orléans (c. 755 – before November 821) was a Frankish count, son of Gerold of Anglachgau and Emma of Alemannia. His sister Hildegard married Charlemagne; therefore, he was the emperor's brother-in-law and uncle to the next emperor, Louis the Pious.

== Family ==
Adrian married Waldrada, and had issue:

- Odo I, Count of Orleans (d. aft. 15 Feb 834), who married Engeltrude of Fézensac, daughter of Count Leuthard I of Paris.
- Waldrada who married Robert III of Worms (d. 834), count of the Oberrheingau and the Wormsgau, father of Robert the Strong.
- William, Count of Blois

== Sources ==
- Keats-Rohan, K.S.B. (2000). Onomastique et parenté dans l'Occident médiéval (in French). Unit for Prosopographical Research.
- Le Jan, Régine (2003). Famille et pouvoir dans le monde franc (VIIe-Xe siècle) (in French). Publications de la Sorbonne.
