= Philip, Duke of Orléans =

French prince (1336–1375)

Philip
- Duke of Orléans
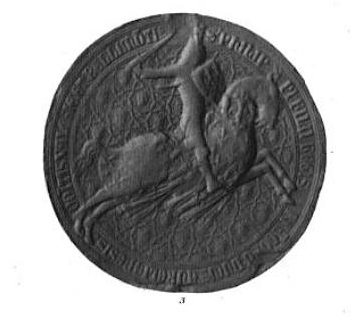
- Seal of Philip, Duke of Orléans
- Born: 1 July 1336; Vincennes
- Died: 1 September 1375 (aged 39); Orléans
- Spouse: Blanche of France (m. 1345)
- Issue: Louis d'Orléans (illegitimate)
- House: Valois
- Father: Philip VI of France
- Mother: Joan the Lame

Philip of Orléans (1 July 1336 – 1 September 1375) was a Duke of Orléans, Touraine, and Count of Valois, the fifth son of King Philip VI of France and Joan the Lame.

His father named him Duke of Orléans, a newly created duchy, in 1344. Shortly before that, in 1343, Philip's father (king Philip VI) initiated negotiations with the dauphin Humbert II of Viennois, regarding the future inheritance of the Dauphiné, a vast feudal polity within the Kingdom of Burgundy (Arles), then under the suzerainty of the Holy Roman Empire. Since Humbert had no heirs, it was initially agreed that all of his feudal domains will pass to young Philip, but already in 1344, those provisions were changed by the new agreement, designating Philip's older brother John as Humbert's heir in the Dauphiné, while Philip was compensated with other domains.

== Marriage and issue ==
On 8 January 1345, Philip married his second-cousin, Blanche of France (1 April 1328 – 1392), the daughter of King Charles IV of France and Joan of Évreux, but they had no children.

Philip had two natural sons; one of them, Louis d'Orléans, became Bishop of Poitiers and Bishop of Beauvais. He also had a natural daughter, Marie d'Orléans, who married Gédéon V of Beauvilliers.

As a consequence of the Treaty of Brétigny, he served some time as a hostage in England for the good behavior of his brother King John II of France, when he was temporarily released.

The Duke of Orléans died in 1375 without any legitimate issue. His title and lands returned to the royal domain of France.

== Ancestry ==
Ancestors of Philip, Duke of Orléans

8. Philip III of France
4. Charles I, Count of Valois
9. Isabella of Aragon
2. Philip VI of France
10. Charles II of Naples
5. Margaret, Countess of Anjou
11. Mary of Hungary
1. Philip of Valois, Duke of Orléans
12. Hugh IV, Duke of Burgundy
6. Robert II, Duke of Burgundy
13. Yolande of Dreux
3. Joan of Burgundy
14. Louis IX of France
7. Agnes of France
15. Margaret of Provence

== Sources ==
- Guiffrey, Jules (1868). Histoire de la réunion du Dauphiné à la France. Paris: Académie des bibliophiles.
- Kibler, William W.; Zinn, Grover A., eds. (2011) [1995]. Medieval France: An Encyclopedia. New York and London: Routledge. ISBN 978-1-351-66566-7.
