= Matfrid =

Frankish count of Orléans

Matfrid (died 836) was the Frankish count of Orléans in the reign of Emperor Louis the Pious. He is usually thought to have been the first of the lineage known to historians as the Matfriede (German Matfridinger or Matfriede).

Matfrid was Count of Orléans from around 818. He accompanied the Emperor on his expedition to Brittany in 824, and served at Louis's court. However, in 825, he supported Lothar, eldest son of Emperor Louis, in his revolt against the Emperor. Restored to favour, he led a Frankish army on the Marca Hispanica, the Spanish frontier, in 827, jointly with his sister's husband Hugh, Count of Tours and Louis's son Pippin, King of Aquitaine.

Matfrid, Hugh, and Pippin failed to meet the invasion by Abu Marwan, and the following year at Aachen an Imperial assembly stripped Matfrid and Hugh of their titles. Thereafter, although Matfrid supported the rebellions of Emperor Louis's sons on every occasion, he was repeatedly restored to his lands, title, and imperial favour.

Matfrid, once more serving Lothar, died in Italy in 836 during a plague.

Jonas of Orléans addressed his "mirror of princes" work De Institutione laicali to Matfrid.

A second Matfrid, presumed to be the son of the first, was active in Lotharingia during the reigns of Lothar and his son Lothar II, a frequent witness to their charters in the period from 843 to 860. A third Matfrid, presumed son of the second, was active in the period 867 to 878. However he may have been the same person as the second Matfried.

Later cognatic members of the Matfriding clan included Godfrey I, Duke of Lower Lorraine and Conrad II, Holy Roman Emperor.
