= Charles I, Duke of Orléans =

French nobleman (1394–1465)

Charles
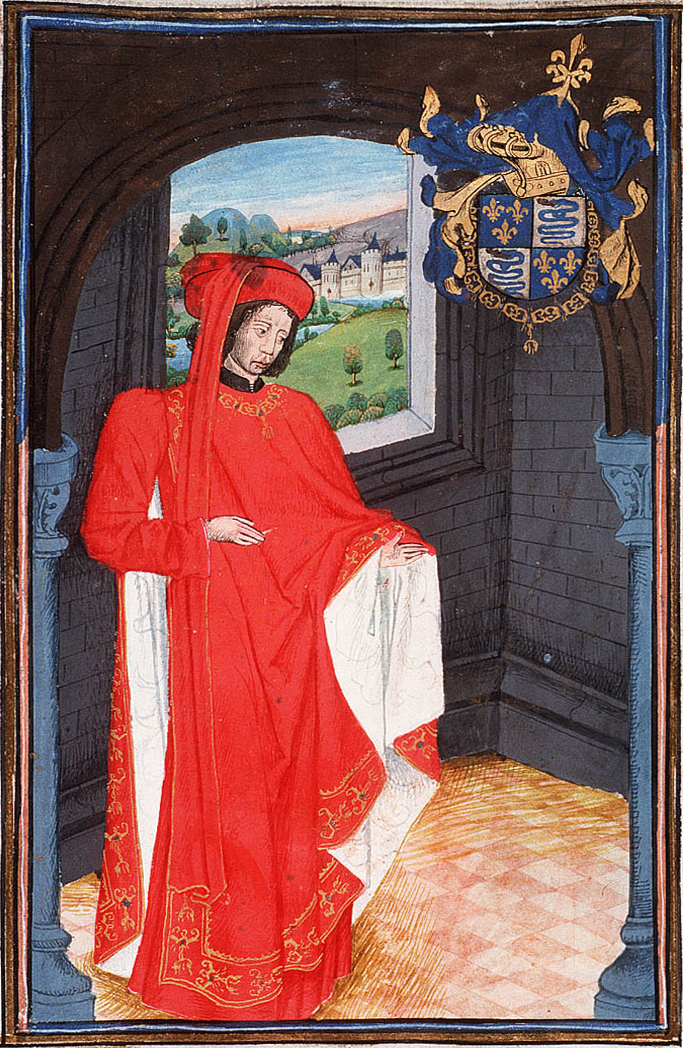
- Miniature from the southern Netherlands, 1473

Duke of Orléans
- Tenure: 23 November 1407 – 5 January 1465
- Predecessor: Louis I
- Successor: Louis II
- Born: 24 November 1394; Paris, France
- Died: 5 January 1465 (aged 70); Amboise, France
- Burial: Saint Denis Basilica, France
- Spouse: Isabella of Valois (m. 1406; died 1409) Bonne of Armagnac (m. 1410; died 1435) Marie of Cleves (m. 1440)
- Issue: Joan, Duchess of Alençon; Marie, Viscountess of Narbonne; Louis XII of France; Anne, Abbess of Fontevraud
- House: Valois-Orléans
- Father: Louis I, Duke of Orléans
- Mother: Valentina Visconti

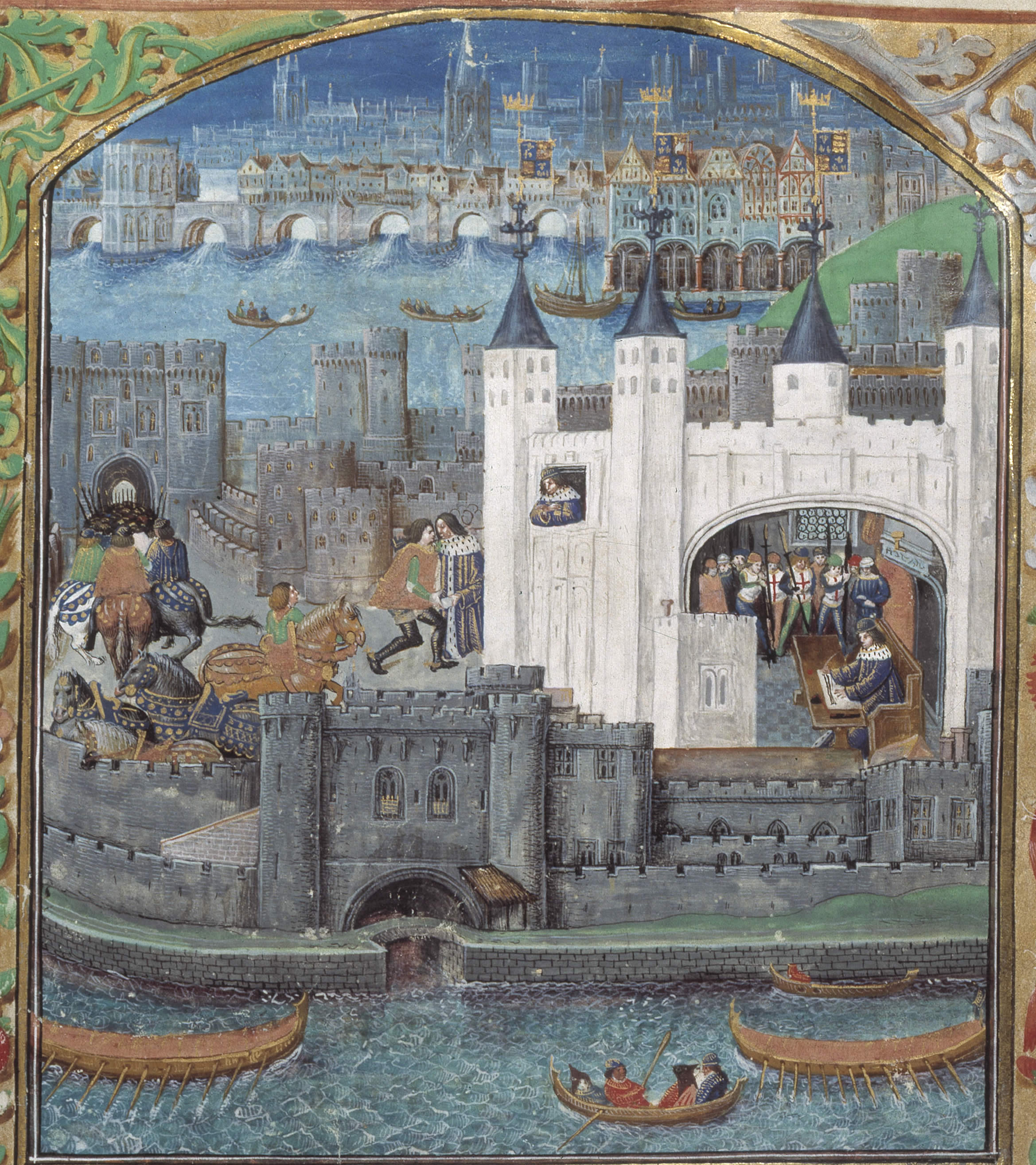
A depiction of Charles' imprisonment in the Tower of London from an illuminated manuscript of his poems

Charles I (24 November 1394 – 5 January 1465) was Duke of Orléans from 1407, following the murder of his father, Louis I, Duke of Orléans. He was also Duke of Valois, Count of Beaumont-sur-Oise and of Blois, Lord of Coucy, and the inheritor of Asti in Italy via his mother Valentina Visconti.

He is now remembered as an accomplished medieval poet, owing to the more than five hundred extant poems he produced, written in both French and English, during his 25 years spent as a prisoner of war and after his return to France.

== Accession ==
Charles was born in Paris, the son of Louis I, Duke of Orléans and Valentina Visconti, daughter of Gian Galeazzo Visconti, Duke of Milan. He acceded to the duchy at the age of thirteen after his father had been assassinated on the streets of Paris under the orders of John the Fearless, Duke of Burgundy. Charles was expected to carry on his father's leadership against the Burgundians, a French faction which supported the Duke of Burgundy. The latter was never punished for his role in Louis' assassination, and Charles had to watch as his grief-stricken mother Valentina Visconti succumbed to illness not long afterwards. At her deathbed, Charles and the other boys of the family were made to swear the traditional oath of vengeance for their father's murder.

During the early years of his reign as duke, the orphaned Charles was heavily influenced by the guidance of his father-in-law, Bernard VII, Count of Armagnac, for which reason Charles' faction came to be known as the Armagnacs.

Even before his father's death, he received a pension of 12,000 livres from King Charles VI, his uncle, in 1403. In addition, his first marriage, to Isabella of Valois, widow of King Richard II of England, may have brought him a dowry of 500,000 francs.

== Imprisonment ==
After the war with the Kingdom of England was renewed by King Henry V of England in 1415, Charles was one of the many French noblemen at the Battle of Agincourt on 25 October 1415. He was discovered unwounded but trapped under a pile of corpses. He was taken prisoner by the English, and spent the next twenty-four years as their hostage. After his capture his entire library was moved from Blois into the care of the Duchess consort of Anjou, Yolande of Aragon (who had elected to support the French), at Saumur in the Duchy of Anjou in 1427 to prevent the works from falling into hostile hands.

The captive Duke was held at various locations in England; he was moved from one castle to another, including the Tower of London, (Note: In a 15th-century artistic interpretation, in a "widely famed image of Charles within the Tower of London [...] Charles is first seen writing his letter inside the White Tower, watched over by men-at-arms wearing the English badge of the St. George's cross".) Bolingbroke Castle (from 1422 to 1423, where he contributed to the building of the Church tower), and Pontefract Castle – the castle where a former English king, Richard II (the first husband of Charles's own deceased first wife Isabella of Valois), had been imprisoned and had died in 1400 at the age of 33. He is likely to have spent some of his captivity in the company of James I, King of Scots. Both were prisoners in the Tower of London in 1416 and at Pontefract in 1417. Charles's last place of confinement seems to have been Stourton, Wiltshire.

The conditions of his confinement were not strict; he was allowed to live more or less in the manner to which he had become accustomed, like so many other captured nobles. However, for a quarter of a century he was not ransomed, since the English King Henry V (r. 1413–1422) had left instructions forbidding any release: Charles of Orléans was the natural head of the Armagnac faction and (as a Prince of the blood and the head of the House of Valois-Orléans) prominent in the line of succession to the French throne. (Note: Charles of Orléans was the grandson of King Charles V of France (r. 1364–1380) and thus the nephew of King Charles VI (r. 1380–1422) and the cousin of King Charles VII (r. 1422–1461). The French crown eventually went to the Valois-Orléans line in the person Charles of Orléans's own son, who reigned as King Louis XII from 1498 to 1515.) He was therefore long deemed by English statesmen too important to be returned to circulation within the French political scene.

== Poetry ==
It was during these twenty-four years that Charles would write most of his poetry, including melancholy works which seem to be commenting on the captivity itself, such as En la forêt de longue attente.

The majority of his output consists of two books, one in French and the other in English, in the ballade and rondeau fixed forms. Though once controversial, it is now abundantly clear that Charles wrote the English poems which he left behind when he was released in 1440. Unfortunately, his acceptance in the English canon has been slow. A. E. B. Coldiron has argued that the problem relates to his "approach to the erotic, his use of puns, wordplay, and rhetorical devices, his formal complexity and experimentation, his stance or voice: all these place him well outside the fifteenth-century literary milieu in which he found himself in England."

One of his poems, Is she not passing fair?, was translated by Louisa Stuart Costello and set to music by Edward Elgar. Claude Debussy set three of his poems to music in his Trois Chansons de Charles d'Orléans, L.92, for unaccompanied mixed choir. Reynaldo Hahn set six of them: Les Fourriers d'été, Comment se peut-il faire ainsi, Un loyal cœur (in Chansons et Madrigaux, 1907), Quand je fus pris au pavillon, Je me mets en votre mercy, and Gardez le trait de la fenêtre (in Rondels, 1899). Maurice Jaubert set another two : 'Complainte de France' and 'Ballade sur la paix'.

== Freedom ==
Finally freed on 3 November 1440 by the efforts of his former enemies, Philip the Good and Isabella of Portugal, the Duke and Duchess of Burgundy, he set foot on French soil again after 25 years, by now a middle-aged man at 46 and "speaking better English than French," according to the English chronicler Raphael Holinshed. Part of the agreement, concluded the previous July, was an immediate ransom payment of 80,000 saluts d'or, and a promise to pay 140,000 crowns later. Philip the Good had also made it a condition that the murder of Charles' father Louis of Orléans by Philip's own father, John the Fearless, would not be avenged (John himself had been assassinated in 1419).

Charles agreed to this condition prior to his release. Meeting the Duchess of Burgundy after disembarking, the gallant Charles said: "M'Lady, I make myself your prisoner." At the celebration of his third marriage, to Marie of Cleves (Philip's niece), he was created a Knight of the Golden Fleece. His subsequent return to Orléans was marked by a splendid celebration organised by the citizens. Marie brought a considerable dowry, which helped to pay part of his ransom, although he had difficulty making up the balance, and that of his brother Jean d'Angoulême, also a prisoner.

He made an unsuccessful attempt to press his claims to Asti in Italy, before settling down as a celebrated patron of the arts. In Blois, he kept a miniature court at which many of the French men of letters at the time—François Villon, Olivier de la Marche, Georges Chastellain, Jean Meschinot and others—were residents or visitors or correspondents. He died at Amboise in his 71st year.

== Marriage and children ==
Coat of arms of Charles d'Orléans

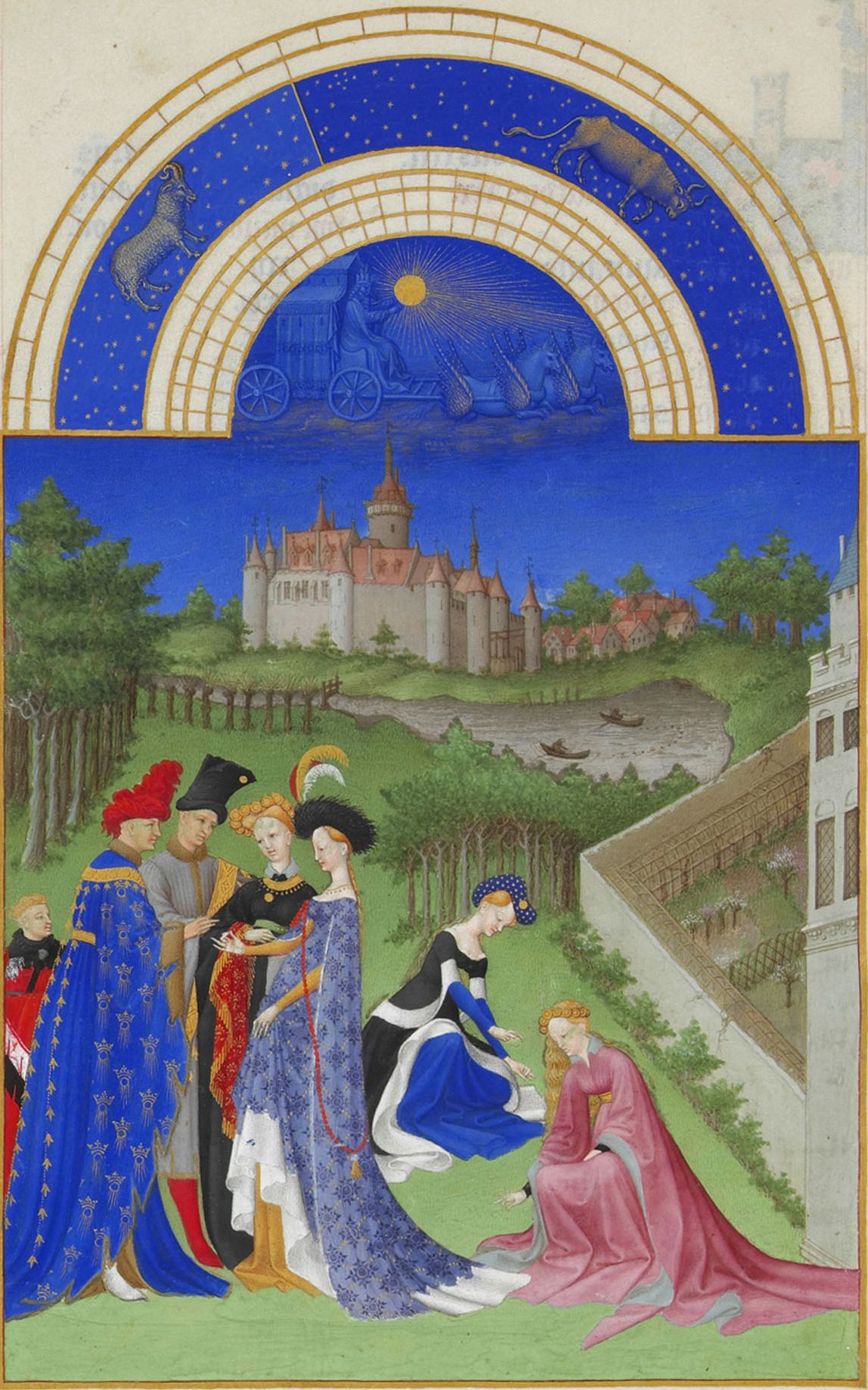
The marriage of Charles I, Duke of Orléans to his second spouse, Bonne of Armagnac at the Château de Dourdan in 1410 - from the manuscript Très Riches Heures du Duc de Berry

Charles married three times. His first marriage, in 1406 at Compiègne, was with his first cousin Isabella of Valois, daughter of Charles VI of France and widow of Richard II of England. She died three years later in childbirth aged 19. Their daughter Joan survived and married John II of Alençon in 1424 in Blois, but died childless.

Secondly, Charles married Bonne of Armagnac, the daughter of Bernard VII, Count of Armagnac, in 1410. Bonne died 5 years before he returned from captivity. The couple had no mutual children because of his captivity.

On his return to France in 1440, Charles married Marie of Cleves in Saint-Omer (daughter of Adolph I, Duke of Cleves) and niece of Philip the Good, who had arranged his release. They had three children:

- Marie of Orléans (19 December 1457 – 1493, Mazères). Married Jean of Foix in 1483.
- Louis XII of France (27 June 1462, Blois – 1 January 1515, Paris). Succeeded Charles as the Duke of Orléans, King of France (1498 - 1515), Duke of Milan (1499 - 1512), King of Naples (1501-1504).
- Anne of Orléans (1464 – 1491, Poitiers), Abbess of Fontevrault and Holy Cross Abbey, Poitiers.

== Honours ==
- Kingdom of France – Duchy of Orléans : Grand Master and Knight of the Order of the Porcupine
- Duchy of Burgundy : Knight of the Order of the Golden Fleece ( List )

== In fiction and popular culture ==
- Charles appears as "Duke of Orléans" in William Shakespeare's Henry V. In the 2012 television adaptation The Hollow Crown, Charles is played by French actor Stanley Weber and is inaccurately portrayed as dying at Agincourt.
- The critically acclaimed historical novel Het Woud der Verwachting / Le Forêt de Longue Attente (1949) by Hella Haasse (translated into English in 1989 under the title In a Dark Wood Wandering) gives a sympathetic description of the life of Charles, Duke of Orléans.
- Charles is a major character in Margaret Frazer's The Maiden's Tale, a historical mystery and fictional account of a few weeks of his life in England in the autumn of 1439, shortly before his release in 1440.
- Charles is a minor character in the historical fiction novel Crown in Candlelight by Rosemary Hawley Jarman.
- Charles is referenced as the author of "the first known Valentine" in Netflix original Big Mouth's Valentine's Day special, "My Furry Valentine".
- Charles’ words "The world is weary of me. And I am weary of it." appear as an epigraph in Michel Houellebecq’s The Map and the Territory.

== Sources ==
- Coldiron, A. E. B. (2000). Canon, Period, and the Poetry of Charles of Orleans: Found in Translation. University of Michigan Press.
- Fox, John (1965). "Charles d'Orléans, poète anglais?". Romania. 86 (3). Librairie Droz: 433–462. doi:10.3406/roma.1965.3007.
- Goldstone, Nancy (2013). The Maid and the Queen: The Secret History of Joan of Arc. Phoenix Paperbacks, London.
- Goodrich, Norma Lorre (1967). Charles of Orléans: A Study of Themes in his French and in his English Poetry. Librairie Droz.
- Saintsbury, George (1911). "Orléans, Charles, Duke of" . In Chisholm, Hugh (ed.). Encyclopædia Britannica. Vol. 20 (11th ed.). Cambridge University Press. pp. 282–283. This includes Saintsbury's own assessment of the poems.
- Vaughan, Richard (2002). John the Fearless: The Growth of Burgundian Power. Vol. 2. The Boydell Press.

French nobility
| Preceded by Louis I/IV | Duke of Valois; 1406–1465 | Succeeded by Louis II/V |
| Preceded by Louis I/IV | Duke of Orléans; Count of Blois and Beaumont-sur-Oise; 1407–1465 | Succeeded by Louis II/V |
