= Anne of Orléans =

Anne of Orléans may refer to:

- Anne of Orléans, Abbess of Fontevraud (1464–1491)
- Princess Anne of Orléans (Anne Hélène Marie; 1906–1986), Duchess of Aosta by marriage
- Princess Anne, Duchess of Calabria (née Princess Anne of Orléans; born 1938)
