= Marie of Cleves, Duchess of Orléans =

Marie of Cleves
- Duchess of Orléans
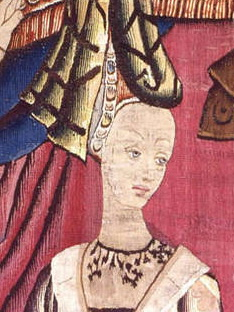
- Marie of Cleves (or Anne of Cyprus)
- Born: 19 September 1426
- Died: 23 August 1487 (aged 60); Chaunay
- Burial: Couvent des Célestins, Paris
- Spouse: Charles I, Duke of Orléans (m. 1440; died 1465) Sieur de Rabodanges (m. 1480)
- Issue: Marie, Viscountess of Narbonne; Louis XII of France; Anne, Abbess of Fontevraud
- House: La Marck
- Father: Adolph I, Duke of Cleves
- Mother: Mary of Burgundy

Marie of Cleves (19 September 1426 – 23 August 1487) was the third wife of Charles I, Duke of Orléans. She was born a German princess, the last child of Adolph I, Duke of Cleves, and his second wife, Mary of Burgundy.

Marie was a patron of letters and commissioned many works; she was also an active poet herself, producing ballads and other verses. After the Duke's death she was secretly remarried in 1480 to one of her gentlemen of the chamber, the Artesian "Sieur de Rabodanges", who was some years her junior. She died in Chaunay.

== Marriage and issue ==
On 27 November 1440, in Saint-Omer, the 14-year-old Marie was married to the 46-year-old Charles of Valois, Duke of Orléans, who was 32 years her senior. She was his third and final wife. They had three children together, the first of whom was born 17 years after their wedding:

- Marie of Orléans, Viscountess of Narbonne (19 December 1457 – 1493); married John of Foix, Viscount of Narbonne in 1483, had issue.
- King Louis XII of France (1462–1515); married firstly Joan of France in 1476, annulled in 1498, no issue; secondly Anne, Duchess of Brittany, in 1499, had issue; and thirdly Mary Tudor in 1518, no issue.
- Anne of Orléans, Abbess of Fontevraud and Poitiers (1464–1491); died unmarried, no issue.

== In literature ==
Marie is a character in Hella Haasse's historical novel about Charles, Duke of Orléans In a Dark Wood Wandering (original Dutch title Het Woud der Verwachting).
