= Tomb of Louis XII and Anne of Brittany =

16th-century royal funerary monument

Coordinates: 48.9356°N 2.3597°E

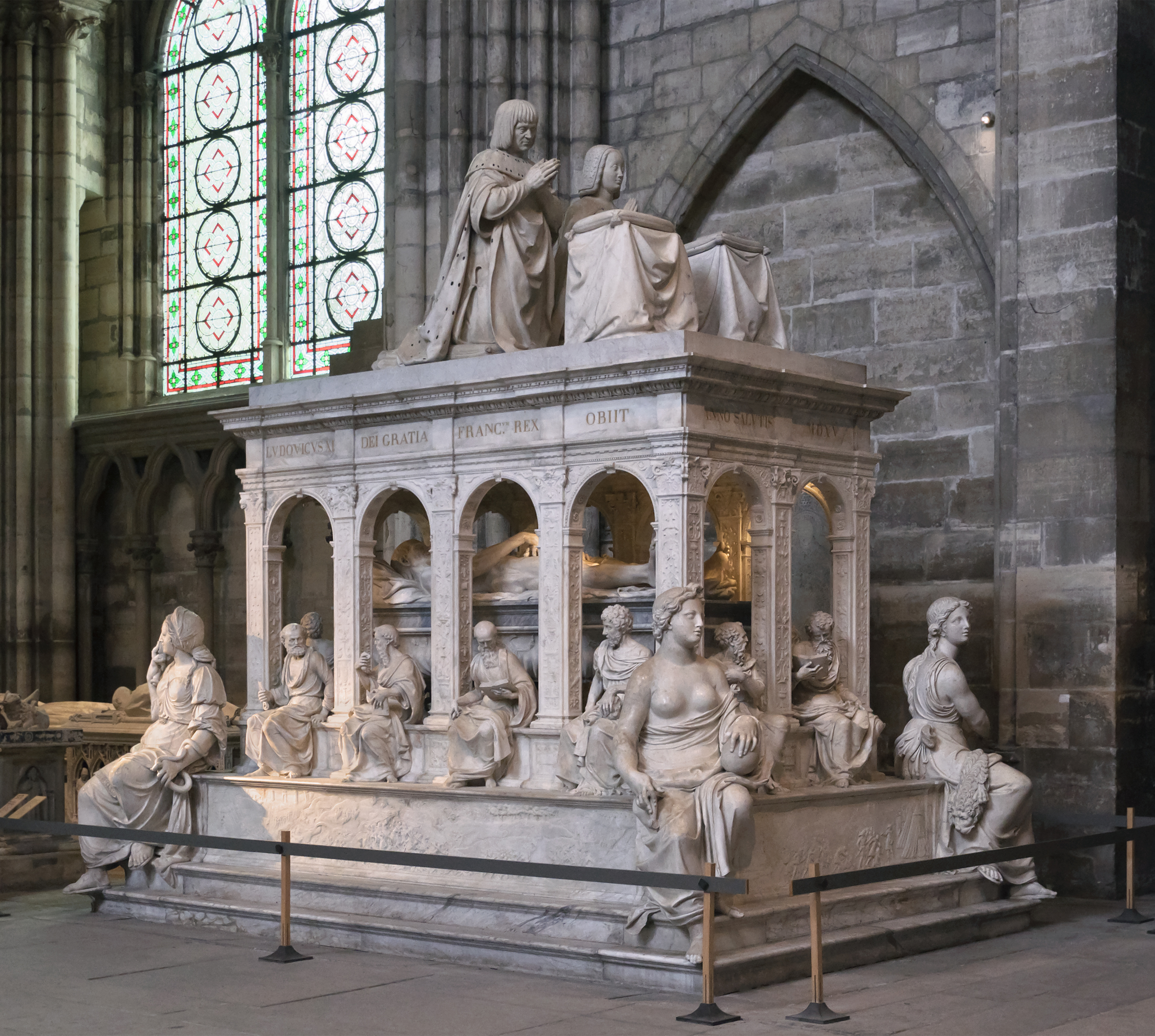
Tomb of Louis XII and Anne of Bretagne, Abbey Church, Saint-Denis

The Tomb of Louis XII and Anne of Brittany is a large and complex silver-gilt and marble sculptured 16th century funerary monument. Its design and build are usually attributed to the Juste brothers although the work of several other hands can be distinguished. Designed for and installed at the Saint-Denis Basilica, France, it was commissioned in 1515 in memory of Louis XII (d. 1515, aged 52) and his queen Anne of Brittany (d. 1514, aged 36), probably by Louis' successor Francis I (reigned 1515–1547), and after years of design and intensive building was unveiled in 1531.

The tomb's monumentality breaks from traditional medieval representations, and is influenced by classical sources, especially Roman, probably borrowed from Andrea Sansovino and contemporary Florentine sculptors. The art historian Barbara Hochstetler Meyer describes it as portraying the deceased "with a verism, poignancy, and sensitivity to nature rarely equalled in the north of Europe during the sixteenth century."

== Description ==
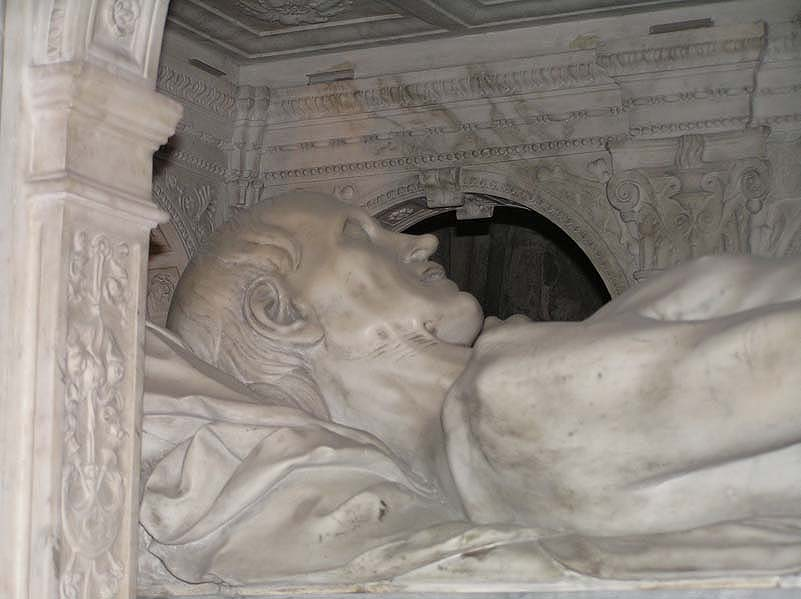
Gisant of Louis XII

Louis is shown in the interior as a gaunt, rotting and naked recumbent cadaver, his head resting on a stone pillow. His death mask is a remarkably realistic depiction of the recently dead: his eyes are sunken into his skull, his skin is taut, his neck is especially emaciated, and his hair is very thin.

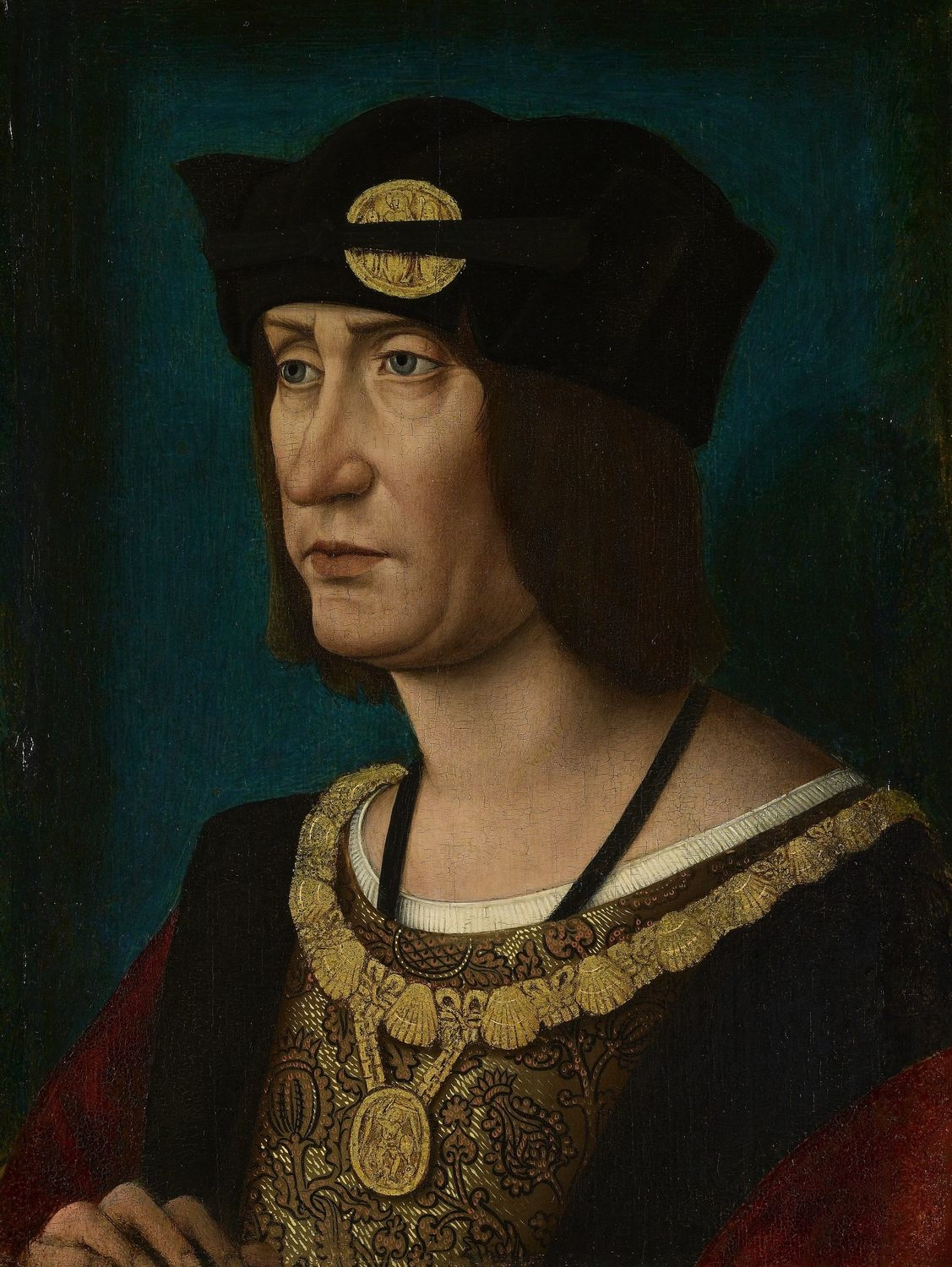
Portrait of Louis XII, attributed to Jean Perréal, c. 1514

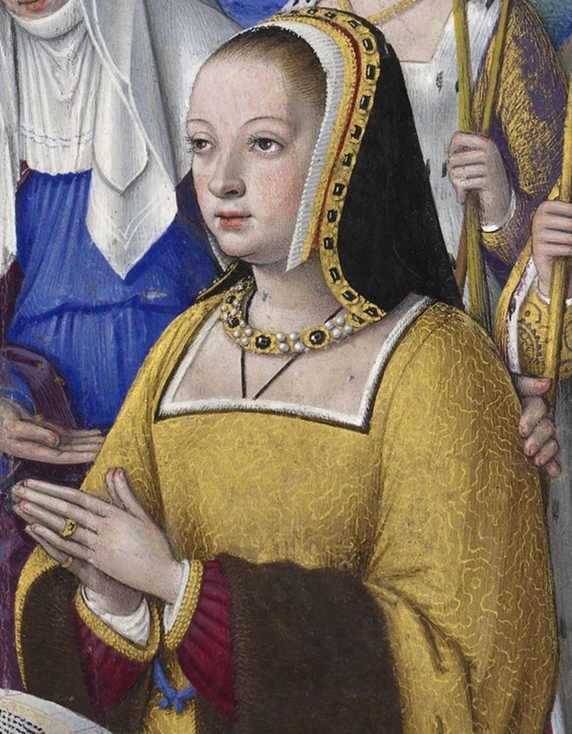
Portrait of Anne of Brittany, c. 1503-08

The stone slab above the tomb shows both alive and in full flesh. Louis and Anne are depicted kneeling beside with their hands clasped in prayer. Unusually, the king is not wearing a crown. He had suffered prolonged illness before his death, and the impact of this is made evident by his sagging skin and decrepit muscles. Nor is his age shied away from; he has a long curved nose, beady and alert but swollen eyes, and a double chin.

The arches of the tomb contain several groupings of seated figures, including apostles and figures representing the seven cardinal virtues. Beyond them, at each corner are four larger, also seated, female figures.

== Gallery ==
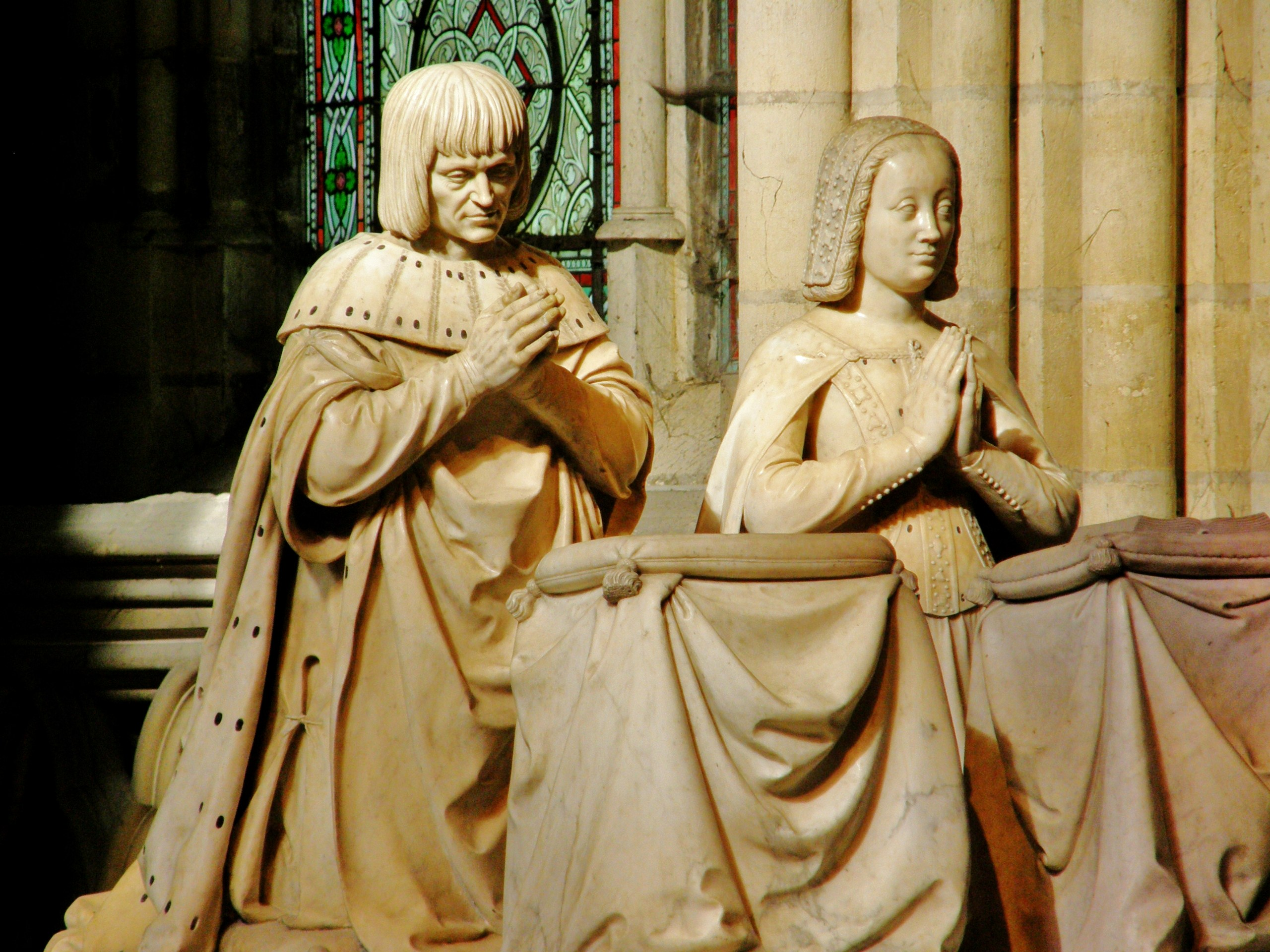
Louis and Anne kneeling in prayer

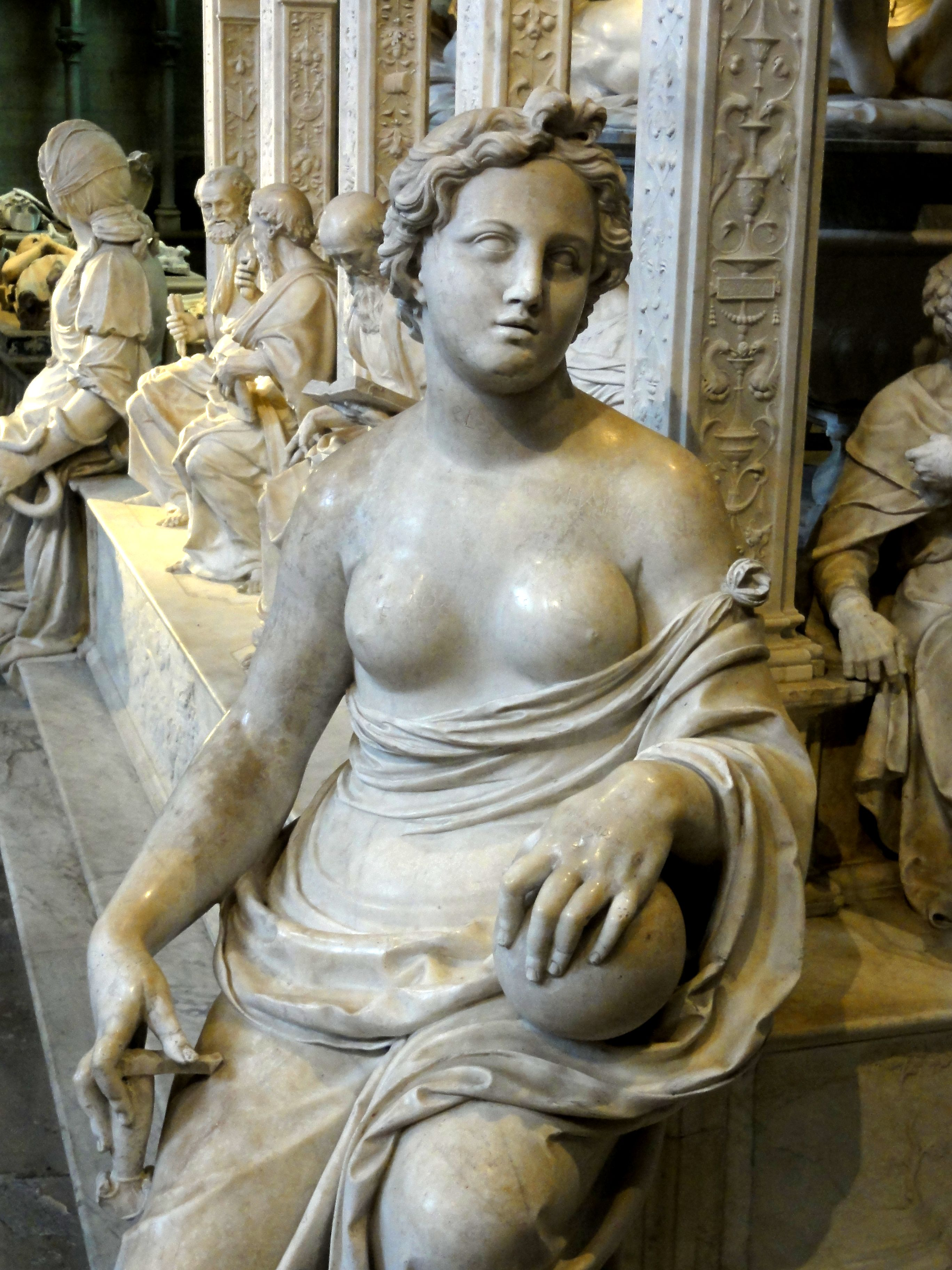
Justice, one of the seven cardinal virtues

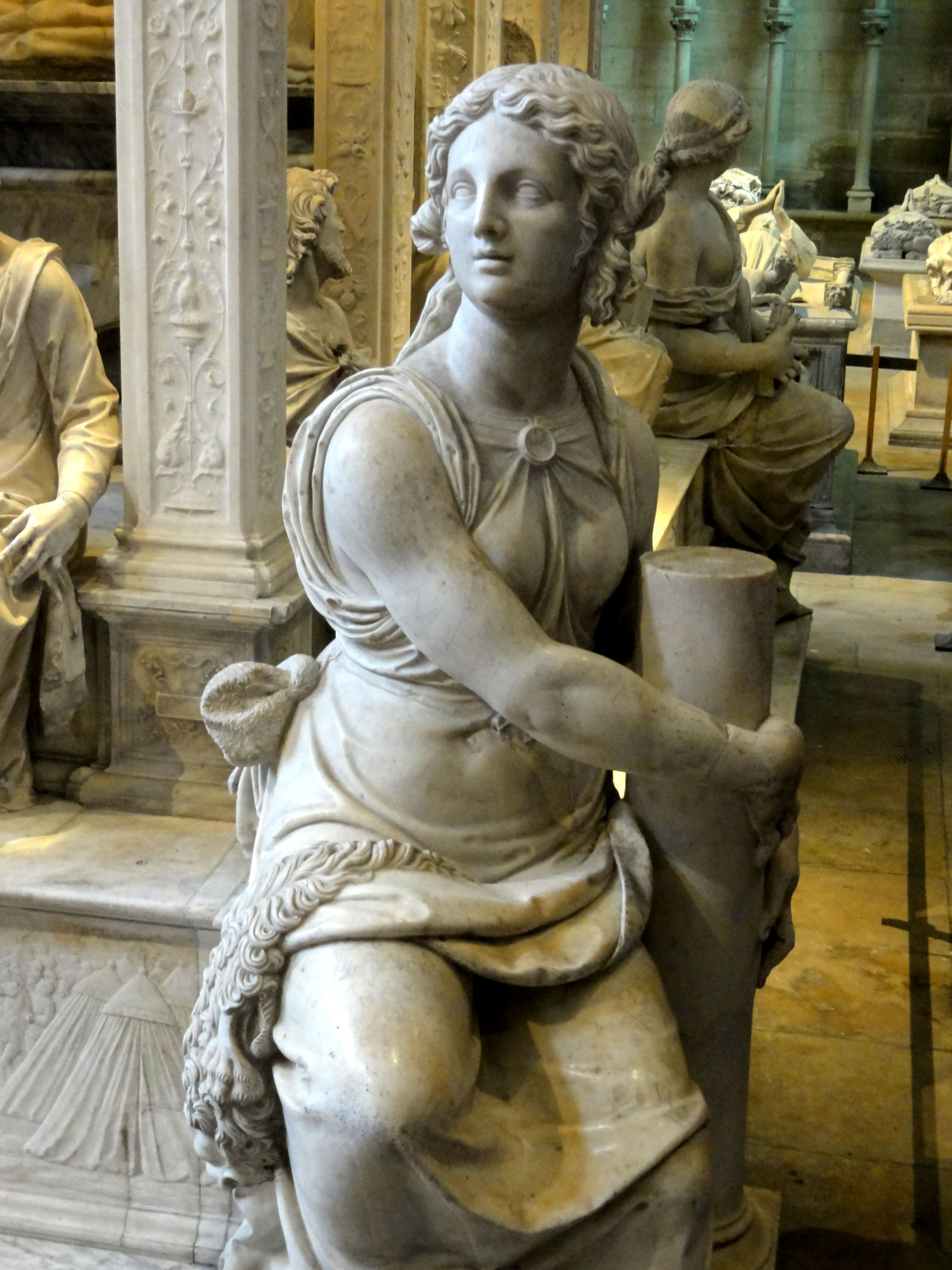
Courage

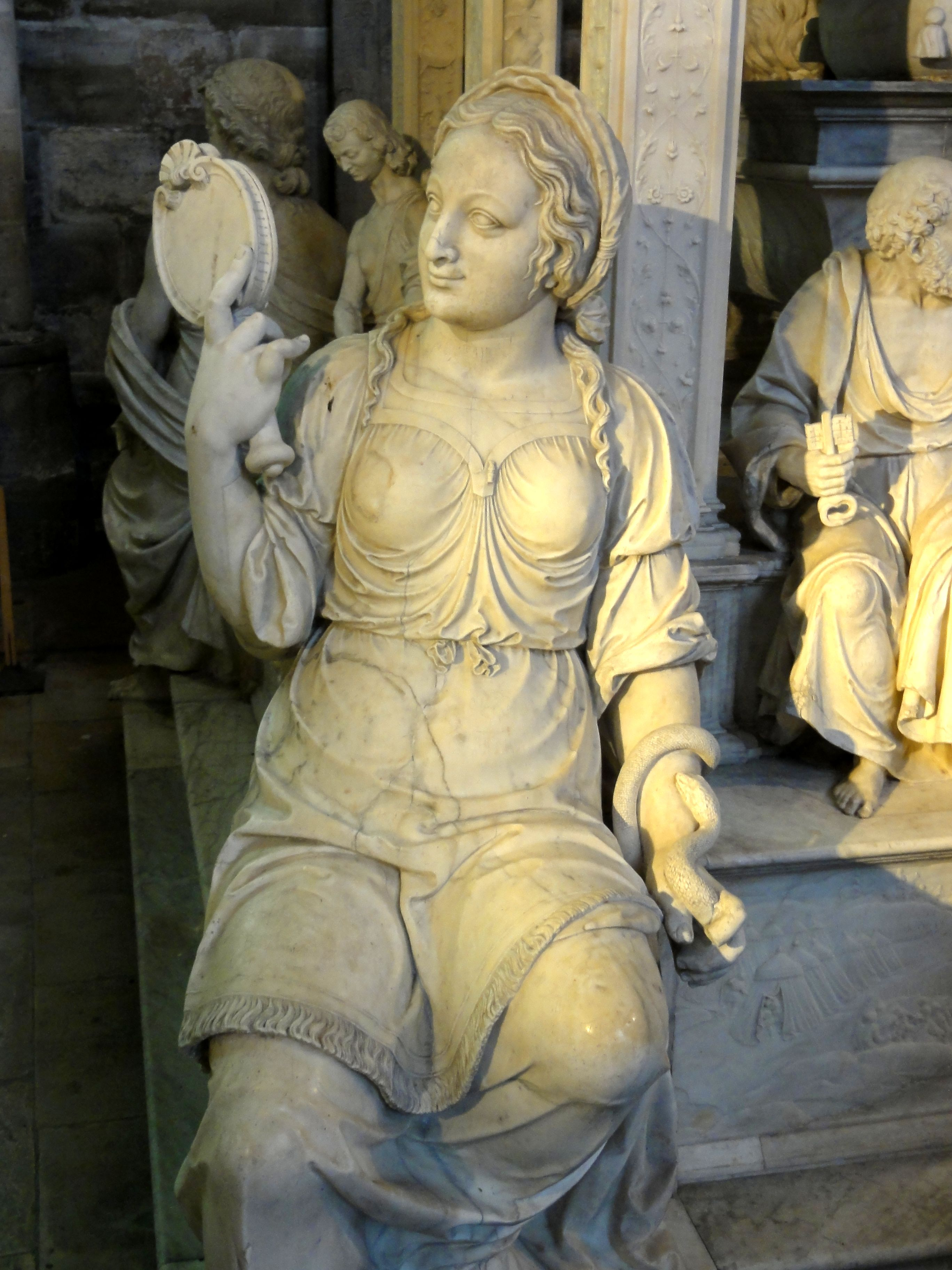
Prudence

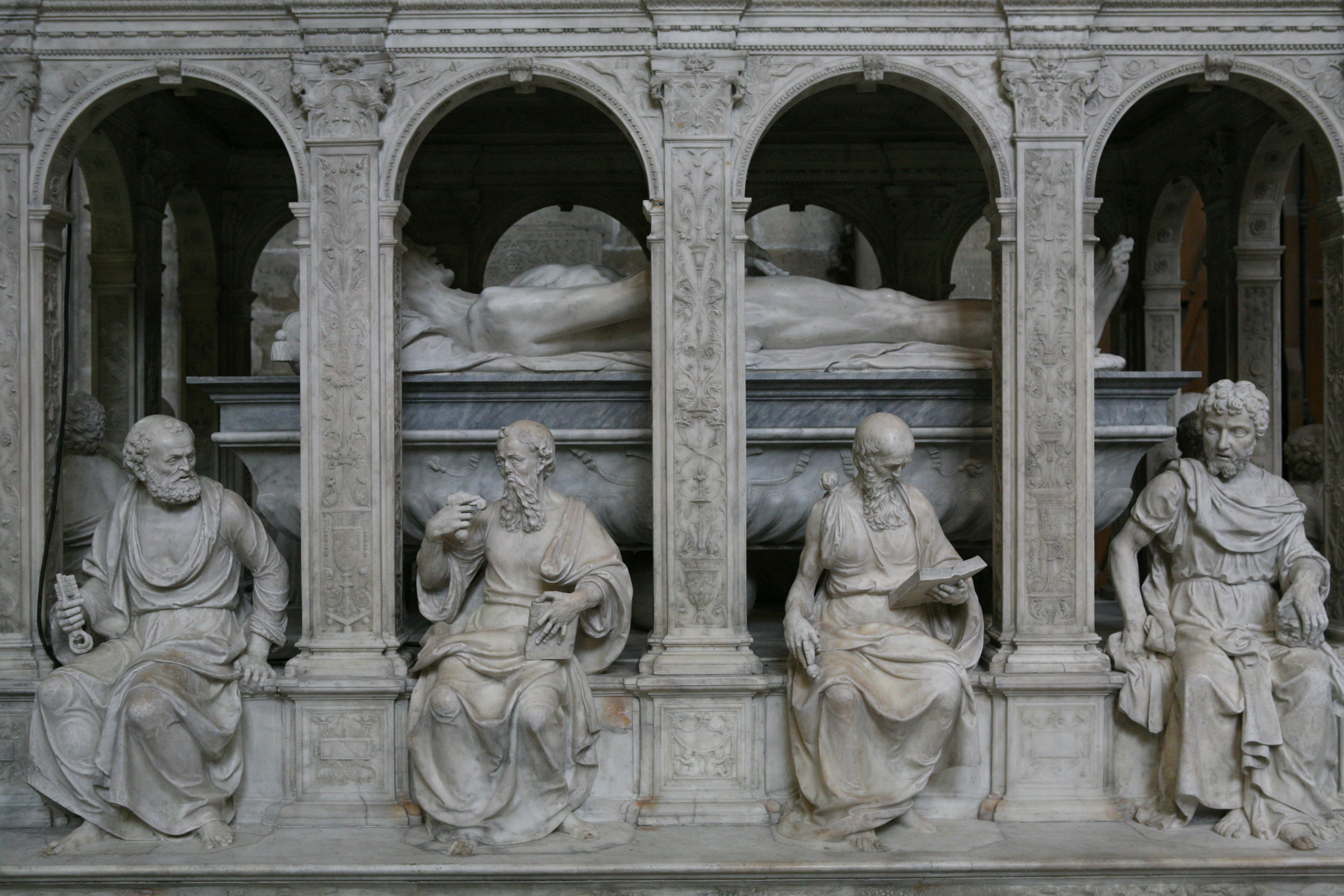
Apostles

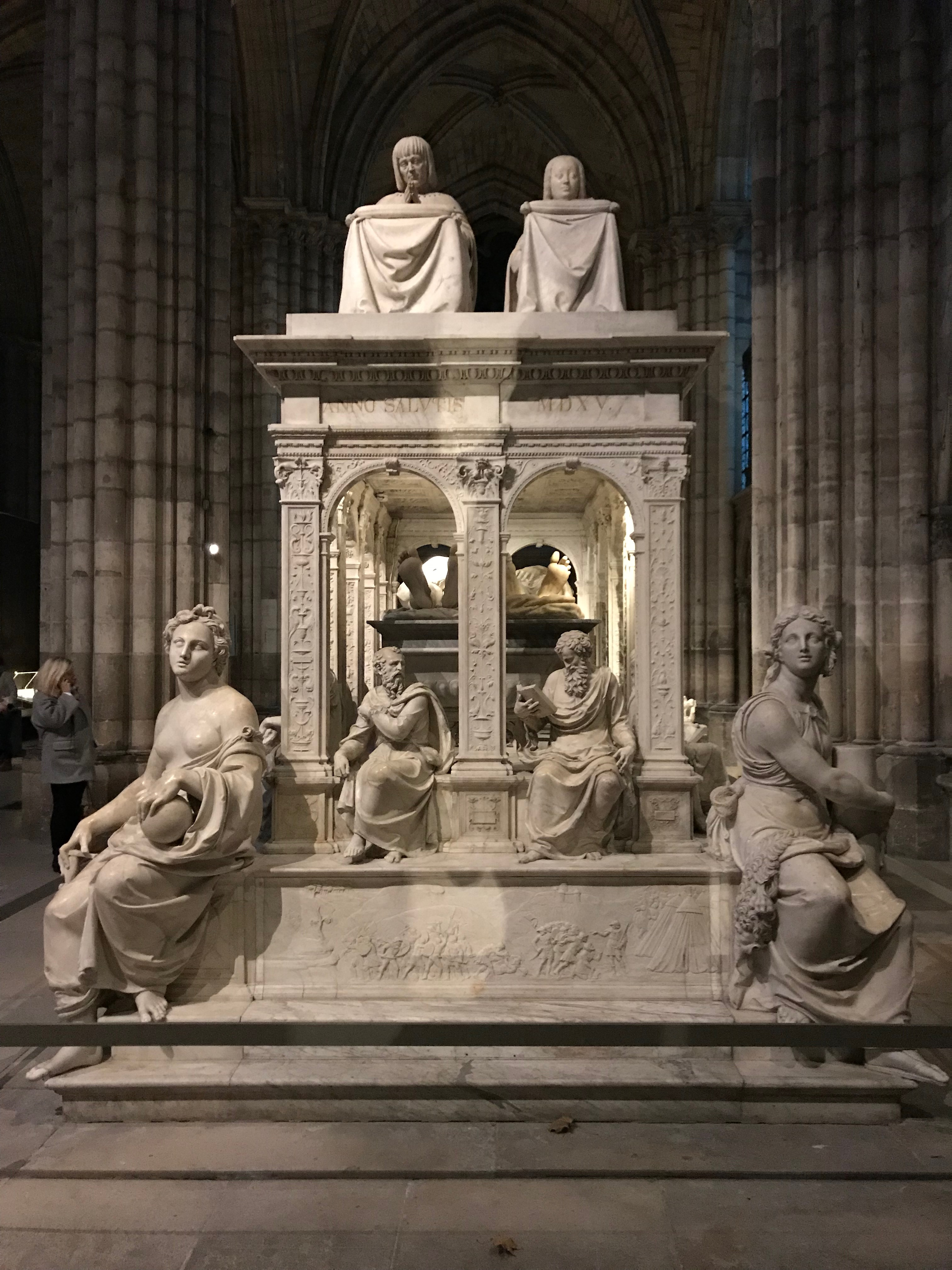
Frontal view

== Sources ==
- Cohen, Kathleen. Metamorphosis of a Death Symbol: The Transi Tomb in the Late Middle Ages and the Renaissance. University of California Press, 1973. ISBN 978-0-5200-1844-0
- Cohen, Kathleen. The Changing Meaning of the Transi Tomb in Fifteenth and Sixteenth Century Europe. University of California Press, 1968
- Dupont, Jacques. "A Portrait of Louis XII Attributed to Jean Perréal". The Burlington Magazine for Connoisseurs. Volume 89, No. 534, 1947
- Giese, Francine; Pawlak, Anna; Thome, Markus (eds). Tomb – Memory – Space: Concepts of Representation in Premodern Christian and Islamic Art, Walter de Gruyter, 2018
- Jugie, Sophie. The Mourners: Tomb Sculpture from the Court of Burgundy . Paris: 1; First Edition, 2010. ISBN 978-0-3001-5517-4
- Hochstetler Meyer, Barbara. Journal of the Walters Art Gallery, volume 40, 1982
