= Is she not passing fair? =

Song composed by Edward Elgar

"Is she not passing fair?" is a song written by the English composer Edward Elgar.

It was completed on 28 October 1886 but not published until 1908, by Boosey & Co.

It is described as a "Lay", written by Charles, Duke of Orléans (1391-1466) and translated from the French by Louisa Stuart Costello.

== Lyrics ==
IS SHE NOT PASSING FAIR?

Is she not passing fair,

She whom I love so well ?

On earth, in sea, or air,

Where may her equal dwell ?

Oh! tell me, ye who dare

To brave her beauty's spell,

Is she not passing fair,

She whom I love so well ?

Whether she speak or sing,

Be jocund or serene,

Alike in ev'rything,

Is she not beauty's queen ?

Then let the world declare,

Let all who see her tell,

That she is passing fair,

She whom I love so well !

== Recordings ==
- Songs and Piano Music by Edward Elgar has "Is she not passing fair?" performed by Mark Wilde (tenor), with David Owen Norris (piano).
- The Songs of Edward Elgar SOMM CD 220 Neil Mackie (tenor) with Malcolm Martineau (piano), at Southlands College, London, April 1999
