= Michel Bucy =

Archbishop and son of Louis XII

- Archbishop of Bourges
- Church: Catholic Church
- Province: Berry, France
- Metropolis: Archdiocese of Tours
- In office: 1505–1511
- Predecessor: Guillaume de Cambrai
- Successor: André Forman

Personal details
- Born: 1484
- Died: 8 February 1511 (aged 26–27)
- Buried: Bourges Cathedral
- Parents: Louis XII
- Education: University of Orleans

Michel Bucy (1484 – 8 February 1511) was the archbishop of Bourges, and the illegitimate son of Louis XII.

== Birth and early life ==
Michel Bucy was born in 1484 to Louis d'Orléans and an unknown mother. Bucy's mother has been the subject of debate: while some speculate that his mother was a count laundress, others believe that his mother was from the House of Amboises given that the Amboises controlled the lands of Bussy (Bucy). Bucy attended the University of Orleans.

== Career ==
At 21, Bucy was named the archbishop of Bourges by his father in November 1505. Although it was standard practice at the time for kings to name underaged individuals from important families as prelates, Louis XII was relatively conservative in this practice, which highlights Bucy as a notable exception. At the onset, Bucy's selection was controversial among the deans, canons, and the chapter as one had to be at least 35 to become an archbishop. Nonetheless, the vast majority of the chapter supported Bucy because of his royal backing, with only one member advocating for a fair election. At this time, Bucy's status as Louis XII's son was not publicly known. Eventually, Bucy received the chapter's overwhelming support and votes – with one abstention. Bucy then declared that it was up to the Pope to judge his qualifications to become archbishop. In his letters to the Pope, Bucy described his position as the illegitimate son of Louis XII and noted that when asked by his father which profession he would be interested in, Bucy – supposedly inspired by Saint Sulpice – chose the Catholic Church.

Bucy officially became archbishop on 22 February, 1506. Although Bucy technically could not become an archbishop due to his young age, he was formally inducted and is generally given that title by the Catholic Church and biographers of his father. In 1509, Bucy consecrated the Church of Saint-Aignan after six additional chapels were added to its nave and other extensive reconstruction efforts were completed.

== Death and Resting Place ==
Bucy died on 8 February 1511. He is buried by the Bourges Cathedral, near the chancellor's stall and next to the archbishopric – the archbishop's break room. On his tombstone's epithet, he is only referred to as the patriarch and primate of the Aquitaines.
