= Anne of Orléans, Abbess of Fontevraud =

Sister of King Louis XII of France and abbess (1464–1491)

Valois-Orleans coat of arms

Anne d'Orléans (1464 – 1491 in Poitiers) was a French abbess. She was the youngest child of Charles I, Duke of Orléans, and Maria of Cleves. Her only brother became King Louis XII of France in 1498.

== Life ==
Anne became abbess of Fontevraud in 1478. This was an abbey in which both monks and nuns lived, but which was always ruled by an abbess. She continued the work of her predecessor Marie de Bretagne in reforming the order.

After serving six years as abbess of Fontevraud, Anne also became abbess of Holy Cross Abbey in Poitiers in 1484 until her death in 1491. The election that followed her death resulted in a violent contest between the brothers of two candidates for abbess.

== Bibliography ==
- Jennifer C. Edwards, “My Sister for Abbess: Fifteenth-Century Power Disputes over the Abbey of Sainte-Croix, Poitiers,” Journal of Medieval History 40, no. 1 (2014): 85–107.
