= Anne Coldiron =

American humanities scholar, university professor and author

Anne Coldiron (who writes under the name A. E. B. Coldiron) is an American humanities scholar, university professor and author, Professor Emerita at Florida State University.

== Life ==
She received her PhD from the University of Virginia.

== Career ==
She writes about translation, poetics, and late-medieval and Renaissance literature. She usually publishes under the name A. E. B. Coldiron. As of 2007, she was professor of English at Florida State University.Since August 2017, she is The Berry Chair in English Literature at the University of St Andrews in Scotland (UK). Since 2022, she is Krafft University Professor Emerita, Florida State University and Honorary Professor, University of St Andrews in Scotland (UK).

== Distinctions ==
She has received fellowships from the National Endowment for the Humanities and the Folger Shakespeare Library.

== Bibliography ==
- Canon, Period, and the Poetry of Charles of Orleans: Found in Translation The University of Michigan Press (30 Nov. 2000) ISBN 978-0472-111466.
- English Printing, Verse Translation, and the Battle of the Sexes, 1476-1557 Routledge (28 Feb. 2009) ISBN 978-0754656081
- Printers Without Borders: Translation and Textuality in the Renaissance Cambridge University Press (9 April 2015) ISBN 978-1107073173. Reprinted in paperback, Cambridge University Press, 2020. ISBN 9781107421561.
- as guest editor, The Translator's Voice in Early Modern Literature and History. Philological Quarterly 2016.
- as co-ordinator, Special Topic on Translation, Publications of the Modern Language Association of America, vol 138, no 3 (2023), pp. 1–486. ISSN 0030-8129. "Introduction, Inside the Kaleidoscope: Translation's Challenge to Critical Concepts," DOI:10.1632/S00308129230000792.
