= Chaunay =

- Commune
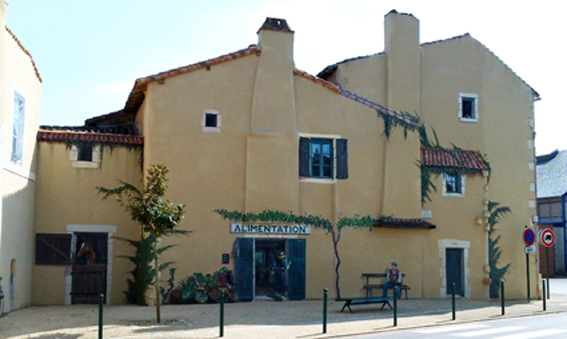
- A fresco by Armand Langlois, seen from the main road
- Location of Chaunay
- Location within France Location within Nouvelle-Aquitaine
- Coordinates: 46°12′29″N 0°09′52″E
- Country: France
- Region: Nouvelle-Aquitaine
- Department: Vienne
- Arrondissement: Montmorillon
- Canton: Lusignan

Government
  - Mayor (2020–2026): Guy Sauvaitre
- Area^{1}: 38.64 km^{2} (14.92 sq mi)
- Elevation: 131 m (430 ft)
- Highest elevation: 148 m (486 ft)
- Lowest elevation: 122 m (400 ft)
- Population (2023): 1,194
  - Density: 30.90/km^{2} (80.03/sq mi)
- Time zone: UTC+01:00 (CET)
  - Summer (DST): UTC+02:00 (CEST)
- INSEE/Postal code: 86068 /86510
- ^{1} French Land Register data, which excludes lakes, ponds, glaciers > 1 km^{2} (0.386 sq mi or 247 acres) and river estuaries.

Chaunay (French pronunciation: [ʃonɛ]) is a commune in the Vienne department in the Nouvelle-Aquitaine region in western France.

== See also ==
- Communes of the Vienne department
