= Robert of Alençon =

French noble (1344–1377)

- Count of Perche
- Robert's coat of arms, per the Armorial of the Capetian dynasty, dimidiated with the coat of arms of Normandy.
- Born: 1344
- Died: 1377 (aged 32–33)
- Buried: Sées
- Noble family: Valois-Alençon
- Spouse: Joan of Rohan
- Issue: Charles (1375–1377)
- Father: Charles II of Alençon
- Mother: María de la Cerda

Coat of arms of the counts of Perche.

Robert of Alençon (1344–1377), Count of Perche, was the son of Charles II, Count of Alençon and María de la Cerda.

== History ==
Robert was born in 1344 to parents Charles II, Count of Alençon and Perche and his wife, Maria de La Cerda y Lara, Countess of Alençon. Upon his father's death in 1346, Robert's elder brother, Charles, inherited the titles of Count of Alençon and Count of Perche.

Robert succeeded his brother, Charles III of Alençon, in 1361 as Count of Perche in Normandy, after Charles renounced his counties and became a Dominican friar, choosing Couvent des Jacobins de la rue Saint-Jacques in Paris. (Note: Jager lists the year of Robert's inheritance as 1367, but Siguret lists it as 1361.)

Philip, the eldest of Charles's younger brothers, had become bishop of Beauvais in 1356, and so their mother obtained permission from King John II of France to divide the counties between the remaining brothers, Peter and Robert. Peter received Alençon, and became Count of Alençon, while Perche was assigned to Robert, who became Count of Perche.

Robert established his court at Nogent-le-Rotrou, a fortified town about 10 miles (16 km) south of Bellême and the county capital of Perche.

On 5 April 1374, at the age of 30, Robert married Joan of Rohan (d. aft. 20 January 1407), the daughter of John I (Jean I), viscount of Rohan (1324–1396), and his wife, Joan, Princess of Navarre (1339–1409), the daughter of Philip III, King of Navarre and Joan II of Navarre. They had one son, Charles (1375–1377), who did not survive his father.

Upon Robert's death in 1377, his title of Count of Perche passed to his elder brother, Peter II, Count of Alençon (French: Pierre d'Alençon), merging the counties of Alençon and Perche. Pierre's son and heir, John I (Jean I), would be elevated to Duke of Alençon in 1414.

== In popular culture ==
The squire-turned-knight Jean de Carrouges, played by actor Matt Damon in the 2021 film The Last Duel, directed by Ridley Scott, served Robert during Robert's tenure as Count of Perche from 1361 to 1377.

Robert's brother and heir, Peter II, Count of Alençon, was portrayed by actor Ben Affleck in the same film.

== Sources ==
- Brouckes, P.F.; Mauguin, M. (2006). "Les preeminence armoriees des Rohan au tympan de la maîtresse-vitre de l'église de La Roche-Maurice". Bulletin de la Société archéologique du Finistère. CXXXV. Société archéologique du Finistère La Société: 187–197.
- Dompnier, Bernard (2006). "Un point d'histoire lyonnaise dans un Consulto de Sarpi". In Marie Viallon-Schoneveld (ed.). Autour du Concile de Trente: actes de la table ronde de Lyon, 28 février 2003 (in French). Université de Saint-Etienne. ISBN 2862723940.
- Doubleday, Simon R. (2001). The Lara Family: Crown and Nobility in Medieval Spain. Harvard University Press.
- Jager, Eric (2005). The Last Duel: A True Story of Crime, Scandal, and Trial by Combat. Crown. ISBN 978-0767914178.
- Siguret, Philippe (2000). Histoire du Perche (in French). Fédération des amis du Perche. ISBN 2900122279.

Preceded by Charles III	Count of Perche; 1361–1377	Succeeded by Peter II
