= Peter II of Alençon =

French nobleman (1340–1404)

Peter
- Peter II's coat of arms, per the Armorial of the Capetian dynasty.
- Born: 1340
- Died: 2 September 1404 (aged 63–64); Argentan, Normandy, France
- Buried: Le Pin-la-Garenne
- Noble family: Valois-Alençon
- Spouses: Marie Chamaillard, Viscountess of Beaumont-au-Maine
- Issue Detail: Marie; Catherine; John I, Duke of Alençon
- Father: Charles II of Alençon
- Mother: Maria de la Cerda

Coat of arms of the counts of Perche.

Peter II, called the Noble [Le Noble] (1340 – 20 September 1404; French: Pierre), was the count of Alençon from 1361 and count of Perche from 1377. He was the son of Charles II of Alençon and María de la Cerda.

== Biography ==
Peter was born in 1340 to Count Charles II of Alençon and Perche and his wife, María de la Cerda. Upon his father's death in 1346, Pierre's elder brother, Charles, inherited Alençon.

Knighted in 1350, Pierre was one of the hostages exchanged for King John II of France after the Battle of Poitiers, and did not return to France until 1370. He and his younger brother, Robert of Alençon, count of Perche, campaigned against the English in Aquitaine. In 1371, the French took Limoges, but failed to capture Usson.

In 1361, Peter's elder brother, Charles, renounced his counties and became a Dominican friar, choosing Couvent des Jacobins de la rue Saint-Jacques in Paris. (Note: Jager lists the year of Robert's inheritance as 1367, but Siguret lists it as 1361.) Philip, the eldest of Charles's younger brothers, had become bishop of Beauvais in 1356, and so their mother obtained permission from King John II to divide the counties between the remaining brothers, Peter and Robert. Pierre received Alençon while Perche was assigned to Robert.

In 1372, Peter bought the town, château, and surrounding lands of Argentan, one of the most important towns in Normandy, for 6,000 livres in gold. Peter later moved his court to Argentan, as it was a fortified hilltop town about 15 miles (24 km) north of Alençon.

Upon the death of his younger brother Robert in 1377, Peter also inherited Perche, including the fortresses at Bellême and Exmes, as Robert had no surviving issue. The inheritance was approved by King Charles V of France.

Peter subsequently fought under Bertrand du Guesclin in Brittany; was wounded before Hennebont; and took part in an expedition against William I of Guelders in 1388.

== Marriage and issue ==
On 10 October 1371, at the age of 31, Peter married Marie Chamaillard, viscountess of Beaumont-au-Maine (c. 1350–18 November 1425), the daughter of William II Chamaillard, lord of Anthenaise (c. 1320–1391) and Marie of Beaumont-Brienne. The Chamaillard family was a powerful noble family, originally from Anjou. Marie Chamaillard was the heir to the lordship of Pouancé, including Pouancé Castle, and four other fiefs, adding them to the fiefs already owned by her husband.

The couple had eight children, though their birth order is disputed: (Note: Some sources list this birth order, while other sources, such as Moranville and Père Anselme, list a different birth order.)

1. Marie (29 March 1373 or 21 Mar 1374–1417 or 1418), born at the Château d'Essay in Essay, Orne
2. Peter (1374–1375), born at the Château d'Argentan in Argentan. Per Cagny's Chronique d'Alençon, the infant Pierre "was poorly governed by the women who looked after him and by his nurse", and died as a result. He was buried at Perseigne Abbey.
3. John (1375–1376), born at the Château d'Argentan in Argentan. He was buried at Perseigne Abbey.
4. Marie (1376–1377), buried at Perseigne Abbey.
5. Joan (c. 1372 or 1377–6 August 1403), born at the Château d'Essay in Essay, Orne, and died at the Château d'Argentan in Argentan. No issue.
6. Catherine (1380–22 or 25 June 1462, Hôtel d'Auxerre, Paris), born at the Château d'Verneuil in Verneuil-sur-Avre, Eure. On 29 August 1404, per the last will and testament of her father, Catherine became the heir to the Château d'Exmes in Exmes; the viscounty of Saint-Sylvain and Thuit; as well as the lordships of Saint-Loyer-des-Champs and Aunou-le-Faucon. (Note: The title "seigneur" (Lord) of Aunou-le-Faucon appears to be disputed. The testament of Pierre II, Comte d'Alençon, dated 29 Aug 1404, bequeathed Aunou-le-Faucon to his daughter, Catherine of Alençon. However, Père Anselme also lists Pierre Cointerel as "Count of Aunou-le-Faucon and Viscount of Perche", with Cointerel's adopted son - Peter (Pierre), the "Bastard of Alençon" (French: Le Bâtard d'Alençon) (c. 1375–d. aft. January 1422), the illegitimate son of Count Pierre by Cointerel's wife, Jeanne de Maugastel - succeeding both Cointerel and his biological father as "seigneur (Lord) of Aunou-le-Faucon". Other documents also list John I of Alençon (Jean I), the only surviving legitimate son of Count Pierre, also contesting his father's bequeathment of certain lands to his sister, Catherine, possibly including Aunou-le-Faucon.)
7. Margaret (1383 – aft. 4 Sep 1404), born at the Château d'Argentan in Argentan. She became a nun at Argentan Abbey.
8. John (9 May 1385–1415), born at the Château d'Essay in Essay, Orne. In 1404, upon his father's death, he succeeded him as count of Alençon and Perche.

He also had one illegitimate son with Jeanne de Maugastel, Dame de Blandé, the wife of Pierre Cointerel, Count of Aunou-le-Faucon and Viscount of Perche under Peter:

1. Peter, "Bastard of Alençon" (French: Le Bâtard d'Alençon) (c. 1375–d. aft. January 1422), Lord of Aunou-le-Faucon

== In popular culture ==
In the 2021 film The Last Duel directed by Ridley Scott, he is portrayed by actor Ben Affleck.

== Sources ==
- Anselme de Sainte-Marie, Augustin (1733). Histoire Généalogique Et Chronologique De La Maison Royale De France, Des Pairs, Grands Officiers De La Couronne & De La Maison Du Roy: & Des Anciens...De Leurs Familles (in French).
- Autrand, Francoise (1994). Charles V: Le Sage (in French). Fayard.
- Cagny, Perceval de; Moranvillé, Henri (1902). Chroniques de Perceval de Cagny (in French). Paris: Librairie Renouard, H. Laurens, successeur. OCLC 1041787721.
- Cosneau, Eugène (1889). Les grands traités de la guerre de cent ans (in French). Alphonse Picard.
- Dompnier, Bernard (2006). "Un point d'histoire lyonnaise dans un Consulto de Sarpi". In Marie Viallon-Schoneveld (ed.). Autour du Concile de Trente: actes de la table ronde de Lyon, 28 février 2003 (in French). Université de Saint-Etienne. ISBN 2862723940.
- Hirschbiegel, Jan (2014). Étrennes: Untersuchungen zum höfischen Geschenkverkehr im spätmittelalterlichen Frankreich zur Zeit König Karls VI. (1380–1422) (in German). De Gruyter.
- Jager, Eric (2005). The Last Duel: A True Story of Crime, Scandal, and Trial by Combat. Crown. ISBN 978-0767914178.
- Potter, David (1995). Keen, Maurice (ed.). A History of France, 1460–1560: The Emergence of a Nation State. Macmillan.
- Siguret, Philippe (2000). Histoire du Perche (in French). Fédération des amis du Perche. ISBN 2900122279.

Peter II of Alençon House of Valois Cadet branch of the Capetian dynasty Born: 1340 Died: 20 September 1404
Preceded by Charles III	Count of Alençon; 1361 – 1404	Succeeded by John I
Preceded by Robert	Count of Perche; 1377 – 1404	Succeeded by John I
