= Armorial of the Capetian dynasty =

Most of the members of the Capetian dynasty bore a version of the arms of France. The arms of France were adopted by the Capetian kings only in the twelfth century. Consequently, the cadet branches that had branched off in earlier periods (Burgundy, Vermandois, Dreux and Courtenay) bore entirely different arms.

Today, many coat of arms of places in France are derived from the royal arms of the French king.

== French royal family ==
Figure	Name of Armiger and Blazon
	Kings of France before 1376 : Azure, semé-de-lys or. The arms of France was first used by Philip Augustus at the beginning of the age of heraldry. Collateral branches of the French royal family already in existence – the Dukes of Burgundy, the Counts of Vermandois and Dreux, and the Lords of Courtenay – used unrelated coats of arms, while the descendants of Philip Augustus bore the arms of France with marks of cadency. after 1376 : Azure, three fleurs-de-lys or. Borne by the following: Charles V (from 1376 to 1380); Charles VI (from 1380 to 1422); Charles VII (from 1422 to 1461); Louis XI (from 1461 to 1483); Charles VIII (from 1483 to 1498); Louis XII (from 1498 to 1515); Francis I (from 1515 to 1547); Henry II (from 1547 to 1559); Francis II (from 1559 to 1560); Charles IX (from 1560 to 1574); Henry III (from 1574 to 1589); Henry IV (from 1589 to 1610); Louis XIII (from 1610 to 1643); Louis XIV (from 1643 to 1715); Louis XV (from 1715 to 1774); Louis XVI (from 1774 to 1792); Louis XVII (used by his supporters in exile 1792–1795); Louis XVIII (from 1795 to 1824, including his periods in exile 1795–1814 and 1815); Charles X (from 1824 to 1836-from 1830 in exile); Then borne by the following pretenders to the French throne: Louis Antoine, Duke of Angoulême (from 1836 to 1844); Henri, Count of Chambord (from 1844 to 1883)
	Dauphins (heirs to the throne), from 1350 The first of the royal dauphins of France was Charles (future king as Charles the Wise), eldest son of John, Duke of Normandy (future king as John the Good), eldest son of Philip VI of France. He bore: Quarterly azure semé-de-lys or, a bordure gules (for Valois); and or, a dolphin azure, crested, barbed, finned, with scales and gills gules (for Dauphiné). Succeeding royal Dauphins bore: Quarterly azure, three fleurs-de-lys or; and or, a dolphin azure, crested, barbed, finned, with scales and gills gules.

== Crowns of the princes of the blood ==
Type of crown	Usage
Couronne une fils de France et pair	Crown of a son or grandson of France and peer of France The sons of kings, and their sons, are called sons and grandsons of France. If granted an appanage was also a peerage, which was usual, they wore the crown with the blue cap.
Couronne une fils de France	Crown of son or grandson of France For a son of France who is not also a peer.
Couronne une prince de sang et pair	Crown of Prince of the Blood and a peer of France The princes of the blood are descendants, in the male line, of grandsons of France. If their appanage was also tied with a peerage of France, their crown had blue cap.
Couronne une prince de sang	Crown of a Prince of the Blood Coronet of a prince of the blood who is not also a peer of France.

== Basic Marks of Difference ==
=== France Ancient ===
The most basic marks of difference used by the Capetians were the label, bordure and bend. Charges and variations were added by cadets with the expansion of the dynasty. The cross and saltire were used as marks of distinction by the spiritual peers of France.

Label gules (Capetian House of Anjou)	Bordure gules (House of Valois, later borne by the House of Valois-Anjou)	Bend gules (House of Bourbon)	Bend compony argent and gules (House of Evreux)	Label compony argent and gules	Bordure compony argent and gules (House of Valois-Burgundy)

=== France Modern ===
Under the House of Bourbon the bend gules gradually evolved into a baton couped, while the label argent and bordure gules were associated with the dukes of Orleans and Anjou, respectively.

Baton couped gules (Princes of Condé)	Label argent (Dukes of Orleans)	Bordure gules (Dukes of Anjou)

== Cadet Branches of the direct Capetians ==
Arms of branches founded before Philip Augustus

House of Burgundy

House of Dreux

House of Courtenay

Arms of branches founded after Philip Augustus

House of Artois

House of Anjou

House of Bourbon

House of Valois

House of Évreux

Figure	Name of Armiger and Blazon
Blason du Vexin français	Louis (1081 † 1137), Count of Vexin, future Louis VI the Fat Azure semé-de-lys or a label ermine. Attributed arms, since heraldry did not exist during his lifetime
	Philip Hurepel (1200 † 1234), Count of Clermont, Boulogne and Dammartin, son of Philip II Augustus Azure, semé-de-lys or, a label of five points gules. First recorded person to bear a differenced version of the arms of France.
	Robert I (1216 † 1250), Count of Artois, son of Louis VIII the Lion and of Blanche of Castile Azure, semé-de-lys or, a label gules, each point charged with three castles or. These arms were used by the descendants in the male line of Robert. (House of Artois)
	Alphonse (1220 † 1271), Count of Poitiers and of Toulouse, son of Louis VIII the Lion and of Blanche of Castile Per pale, azure, semé-de-lys or, and gules, semé of castles or. The castles in the arms of Robert of Artois, Alphonse of Poitiers and Charles of Anjou are derived from and allude to the arms of their mother, Blanche of Castile.
	Charles I (1226 † 1285), Count of Anjou, King of Sicily and Count of Provence, son of Louis VIII of France and of Blanche of Castile before 1246: Azure, semé-de-lys or, a bordure gules charged with eleven castles or. after 1246: Azure, semé-de-lys or, a label gules Founder of the House of Anjou-Sicily.
	John Tristan (1250–1270), Count of Valois, son of Louis IX of France Azure, semé-de-lys or, a bordure gules, these arms were also borne by: Peter I (1252 † 1283), Count of Alençon, his brother.; Charles (1270 † 1325), Count of Valois, Anjou and Maine, his nephew, son of Philip III the Bold, founder of the House of Valois
	Peter I (1252–1283), Count of Alençon, son of Louis IX of France before 1270: Azure, semé-de-lys or, a bordure gules charged with eight plates. after 1270: Azure, semé-de-lys or, a bordure gules.
	Robert (1256–1317), Count of Clermont and Lord of Bourbon, son of Louis IX of France Azure, semé-de-lys or, a bend gules. Founder of the House of Bourbon
	Louis (1276–1319), Count of Évreux, son of Philip III of France Azure, semé-de-lys or, a bend compony argent and gules. Ancestor of the House of Évreux-Navarre
	Philip (1291–1322), Count of Poitiers and later Philip V, King of France and Navarre. Azure, semé-de-lys or, a label compony gules and argent.
	Charles (1294–1328), Count of La Marche and later Charles IV, King of France and Navarre. Azure, semé-de-lys or, a bordure compony gules and argent.
	Kings of France and Navarre: Louis X the Quarreler, Philip V the Tall, Charles IV the Fair Queen of Navarre: Joan II Dimidiated per pale, azure, semé-de-lys or, and gules, chains or linked in orle, cross and saltire, the centre charged with an emerald proper.

== House of Valois ==
Arms of Valois cadet branches

House of Alençon

House of Anjou

House of Burgundy

House of Orléans

Orléans-Longueville

Figure	Name of Armiger and Blazon
	Charles de France (1270 † 1325), Count of Valois, Alençon, Chartres and Perche (1285), Count of Anjou and Maine (1290), Duke of Anjou (1297), founder of the branch, son of Philip III, King of France before 1297: Azure, semé-de-lys or, a bordure-label gules. after 1297: Azure, semé-de-lys or, a bordure gules.
	John of France, son of Philip VI of France, Duke of Normandy from 1332 to 1350. Became King of France as John II. Louis I (1339 † 1384), Duke of Anjou, son of John II the Good, King of France. Founder of the House of Valois-Anjou Azure, semé-de-lys or, a bordure gules.
	Philip (1336 † 1375), Duke of Orléans, son of Philip VI of France Azure, semé-de-lys or, a label compony of gules and argent; that is, France Ancient, a label compony of gules and argent.
	Charles of France (1338 † 1380), Dauphin of Viennois, Duke of Normandy, eldest son of John II the Good, King of France. Became King of France as Charles V. Quarterly, 1 and 4 azure, semé-de-lys or, a bordure gules (which is for Valois); 2 and 3 or, a dolphin azure crested, barbed, and finned gules (which is for Viennois).
	John (1340 † 1416), Duke of Berry, son of John II the Good, King of France. Azure, semé-de-lys or, a bordure engrailed gules.
	Philip the Bold (1342 † 1404), Count of Touraine and Duke of Burgundy, son of John II the Good, King of France. Founder of the House of Valois-Burgundy Azure, semé-de-lys or, a bordure compony of gules and argent.
	Joan (1492 † 1549), daughter of John II and then married Charles II of Navarre Per pale, 1 gules, chains or, linked in orle, cross and saltire, charged at the center with an emerald proper; and in 2 azure, semé-de-lys or, a bend compony of argent and gules and azure, semé-de-lys.
	Louis (1372 † 1407), Duke of Orléans, brother of Charles VI Azure, three fleurs-de-lys or, a label argent.
	John (1372 † 1407), Duke of Touraine, son of Charles VI Azure, three fleurs-de-lys or, a bordure engrailed argent and gules
	Charles of France, Duke of Berry, then Duke of Normandy, then Duke of Guyenne (1446 † 1472), son of Charles VII, King of France In 1461: Azure, three fleurs-de-lys or, a bordure engrailed gules (Berry). In 1465: Quarterly: 1 and 4, azure, three fleurs-de-lys or, a bordure engrailed gules (Berry); 2 and 3, gules, two lion passants or (Normandy). After 1469: Quarterly: 1 and 4, azure, three fleurs-de-lys or, a bordure engrailed gules (Berry); 2 and 3, gules, a lion passant or (Guyenne).
	Saint Joan of France (1464 † 1505), daughter of Louis XI, King of France, married in 1476 to Louis XII (1462 † 1515) Dimidiated, France moderne and France moderne. This is the arms of a married woman, wherein the dexter half represents her husband, and the sinister half represents her father, both kings of France.

=== Valois House of Orléans ===
Figure	Name of Armiger and Blazon
	Louis (1372 † 1407), Duke of Orléans, brother of Charles VI Azure, three fleurs-de-lys or, a label argent, then used by: Charles (1394 † 1465), Duke of Orléans, son of Louis d'Orléans; Louis II (1462 † 1515), Duke of Orléans, before he became King of France (Louis XII) in 1498, son of Charles d'Orléans
	Claude of France (1499 † 1524), daughter of Louis XII of France and Anne of Brittany, then, in 1514, Queen of France Before 1514: Quarterly, azure, three fleurs-de-lys or, and ermine. From 1514 to 1515: Per pale, azure, three fleurs-de-lys or, a label argent, and quarterly azure, three fleurs-de-lys or, and ermine. After 1515: Per pale, azure, three fleurs-de-lys or, and quarterly azure, three fleurs-de-lys or, and ermine.
	Philip of Orléans (1396 † 1420), Count of Vertus, son of Louis d'Orléans Azure, three fleurs-de-lys or, a label argent of three points, the central point charged with a crescent gules.
	John d'Orléans (1400 † 1467), Count of Angoulême, son of Louis d'Orléans Azure, three fleurs-de-lys or, a label argent of three points, each point charged with a crescent gules, then used by: François (1494 † 1549), Count of Angoulême, son of Charles of Angoulême, before he became King of France (François I) in 1515; Armorial de Gilles Le Bouvier gives an alternative, for Orleans-Angoulême: Azure, three fleurs-de-lys or, a label argent of three points, on the first point a crescent azure.
	Charles, Count of Angoulême (1459–1496), son of John, Count of Angoulême (1400 † 1467), Count of Angoulême. Quarterly, I and IV azure, three fleurs-de-lys or, a label argent charged with three crescents gules (for Orléans-Angoulême), II and III argent, a biscione azure crowned or, devouring a child carnation (for the Visconti of Milan).
	Charles, Count of Angoulême and Duke of Orléans, son of Francis I of France. Quarterly, I and IV azure, three fleurs-de-lys or, a label argent, II and III argent, a biscione azure crowned or, devouring a child carnation.
	John d'Orléans (1402 † 1468), Count of Dunois, illegitimate son of Louis d'Orléans Azure, three fleurs-de-lys or, a label argent, overall a bend sinister argent, For his descendants, the Counts of Longueville: Azure, three fleurs-de-lys or, a label argent, overall a baton sinister argent.
	Marguerite (1492 † 1549), Count of Alençon, son of Charles of Orléans
	Francis (1518 † 1536), dauphin, Duke of Brittany, son of Francis I Quarterly, I and IV, grand-quarterly 1 and 4, azure, three fleurs-de-lys or; 2 and 3, or, a dolphin azure, crested, barbed and finned gules; II and III, grand-quarterly 1 and 4, azure, three fleurs-de-lys or; 2 and 3, ermine., then used by: Henry (1519 † 1559), his brother, dauphin and Duke of Brittany from 1536, before he became King of France (Henry II) in 1549
	Francis (1544 † 1560), dauphin, King of Scotland, before he became King of France (Francis II), son of Henry II Quarterly, I and IV, grand-quarterly 1 and 4, azure, three fleurs-de-lys or; 2 and 3, or, a dolphin azure, crested, barbed and finned gules; II and III, or, a lion rampant gules, enclosed in two tressures, flory and counter-flory, also gules.
	Élisabeth de France (1545 † 1568), Queen of Spain, daughter of Henry II, married in 1559 to Philip II of Spain (1527 † 1598) Per pale, I, Quarterly, 1 and 4 gules, a three-towered castle or, masoned sable and ajouré azure; 2 and 3, argent, lion rampant purpure crowned or, langued and armed gules, enté en point argent a pomegranate proper seeded gules, supported, sculpted and slipped vert; II, azure, three fleurs-de-lys or.
	Alexandre-Édouard (1551 † 1589), Count of Angoulême, then Duke of Orléans, Duke of Anjou and Duke of Bourbon and Count of Forez and Peer of France, elected King of Poland and Grand Duke of Lithuania in 1573, before he became King of France (as Henry III) in 1575, son of Henry II, King of France before 1573: Azure, three fleurs-de-lys or, a label of three points gules. from 1573 to 1575: Quarterly, I and IV, gules, an eagle argent, beaked, langued, membered, crowned or; II and III, a knight argent, bearing a shield azure, a patriarchal cross or; overall an inescutcheon azure three fleurs-de-lys or. after 1575: Azure, three fleurs-de-lys or.
	Hercule François (1555 † 1584), Duke of Alençon, then Duke of Anjou in 1576 before 1576: Azure, three fleurs-de-lys or, on a bordure gules eight plates. after 1576: Azure, three fleurs-de-lys or, a bordure gules.

=== Valois House of Anjou ===
Figure	Name of Armiger and Blazon
	Louis I (1339 † 1384), Duke of Anjou and Count of Provence Before 1382: Azure semé-de-lys or, a bordure gules. After 1382: Per pale, argent, a cross potent or, cantonned with four crosses or, and dimidiated azure, semé-de-lys or, a label gules and azure, semé-de-lys or a bordure gules, then used by: Louis II (1377 † 1417), Duke of Anjou and Count of Provence, son of Louis I; Louis III (1403 † 1434), Duke of Anjou and Count of Provence, son of Louis II
	Marie of Anjou (1404 † 1463), daughter of Louis II, Duke of Anjou and Count of Provence, married in 1422 to Charles VII (1403 † 1461) Dimidiated, azure, three fleurs-de-lys or, and per pale, argent, a cross potent or, cantonned with four crosses or, dimidiated with azure, semé-de-lys or, a label gules and azure, semé-de-lys or, a bordure gules.
	René I (1408 † 1480), Duke of Lorraine, Bar and Anjou, King of Naples and Count of Provence, son of Louis II In 1420: Quarterly, 1 and 4, azure, semé-de-lys or, a bordure gules; 2 and 3 azure, semy of crosslets or and two barbels or. Overall or, a bend gules charged with three alerions argent. In 1435: Per fess and tierced per pale, 1 barry of gules and argent, 2 azure, semé-de-lys or, a label gules, 3 argent, a cross potent or, cantonned by four crosslets or, 4 azure, semé-de-lys or, a bordure gules, 5 azure, semy of crosslets or, two barbels or, 6 or, a bend gules charged with three alérions argent. In 1443: Per fess and tierced per pale, 1 barry of gules and argent, 2 azure, semé-de-lys or, a label gules, 3 argent, a cross potent or, cantonned by four crosslets or, 4 azure, semé-de-lys or, a bordure gules, 5 azure, semy of crosslets or, two barbels or, 6 or, a bend gules charged with three alérions argent, inescutcheon or, four pallets gules, then used by: John II (1425 † 1470), Duke of Lorraine and Calabria, son of René I; Nicholas (1448 † 1473), Duke of Lorraine, son of John II; In 1453: Per fess, the chief tierced in pale, 1 barry of gules and argent, 2 azure, semé-de-lys or, a label gules, 3 argent, a cross potent or, cantonned by four crosslets or; the base per pale, azure, semé-de-lys or, a bordure gules, and azure, semy of crosslets or, two barbels or. Overall or, four pallets gules. In 1470: Per saltire, 1 azure, semé-de-lys or, a label gules; 2 barry of gules and argent; 3 argent, a cross potent or, cantonned by four crosslets or; 4 azure, semy of crosslets or, two barbels or. Overall azure, three fleurs-de-lys or, a bordure gules.
	Charles, Count of Maine (1414 † 1472), son of Louis II, Duke of Anjou, son of Louis II Azure, semé-de-lys or, a bordure gules, charged at the dexter chief with a lion argent.
	Charles IV, Duke of Anjou (1436 † 1481), Duke of Anjou, Count of Maine and Provence, son of Charles, Count of Maine Quarterly, I and IV tierced in pale, 1 barry of gules and argent, 2 azure, semé-de-lys or, a label gules, 3 argent, a cross potent or cantonned by four crosslets or; II and III azure, semé-de-lys or, a bordure gules; inescutcheon or, four pallets gules.

=== Valois House of Burgundy ===
Figure	Name of Armiger and Blazon
	Philip the Bold (1342 † 1404), Count of Touraine, then Duke of Burgundy (1364), son of John II, King of France Before 1364: Azure, semé-de-lys or, a bordure compony of argent and gules. After 1364: Quarterly, 1 and 4, azure, semé-de-lys or, a bordure compony of argent and gules; 2 and 3 bendy of six or and azure, a bordure gules
	John the Fearless (1371 † 1419), Duke of Burgundy, Count of Nevers, Flanders,..., son of Philip the Bold Quarterly, 1 and 4, azure, semé-de-lys or, a bordure compony of argent and gules; 2 and 3 bendy of six, or and azure, a bordure gules, overall or, a lion sable armed and langued gules.
	Philip the Good (1396 † 1467), Grand Duke of the West, Duke of Burgundy and Brabant, Count of Flanders, Hainaut and Holland,..., son of John the Fearless Quarterly, 1 and 4, azure, semé-de-lys or, a bordure compony of argent and gules; 2 per pale, bendy of six or and azure, a bordure gules and sable, a lion or, armed and langued gules; 3 per pale, bendy of six, or and azure, a bordure gules and argent, a lion gules, armed and langued or. Overall, or, a lion sable armed and langued gules., then used by: his son Charles the Bold (1433 † 1477), Grand Duke of the West,...
	Charles the Bold (1433 † 1477), Count of Charolais, son of preceding Arms of Burgundy (the arms of his father), brisured by a label argent. At the death of his father in 1467, he became Duke of Burgundy, so he suppressed the label.
	Mary of Burgundy (1457 † 1482), duchess de Burgundy and Brabant, countess of Hainaut and Holland..., only child of the last duke of Burgundy Charles le Téméraire Impaled her husband's arms Maximilian of Austria (left) top impaled Austria Ancient and Austria modern, on bottom tiercé impaled Styria, de Carinthia et de Carniola, overall Tyrol with her father's (on the right) Quarterly, 1 and 4, azure, semé-de-lys or, a bordure compony of argent and gules; 2 per pale, bendy of six or and azure, a bordure gules and sable, a lion or, armed and langued gules; 3 per pale, bendy of six, or and azure, a bordure gules and argent, a lion gules, armed and langued or. Overall, or, a lion sable armed and langued gules.,
	Marie of Clèves-Burgundy (1393 † 1463), Duchess of Clèves and Countess of La Marck, daughter of John the Fearless and wife of Adolphe IV of La Marck Quarterly, 1, gules, an escutcheon argent, surmounted by the rays of an escarbuncle or; 2, azure, semé-de-lys or, a bordure compony of argent and gules; 3 or, a fess chequy of three rows, argent and gules; 4 bendy of six, or and azure, a bordure gules; overall the sinister half of Flanders issuant from fess point.
	Margaret of Burgundy, daughter of Philip the Bold, Duke of Burgundy and Margaret of Flanders, Countess of Flanders, Burgundy, Nevers and Rethel Quarterly, I, fusilly bendwise azure and argent (for Wittelsbach); II, azure, semé-de-lys or, a bordure compony of argent and gules; III grand-quarterly 1 and 4 or, a lion sable, armed and langued gules; 2 and 3 or, a lion gules, armed and langued azure; IV bendy of six, or and azure.
	Anthony (1364 † 1415), Duke of Brabant, son of Philip the Bold Quarterly, 1 and 4, azure, three fleurs-de-lys or, a bordure compony of argent and gules; 2, sable, a lion or, armed and langued gules; 3, argent, a lion gules, armed and langued or, then used by: John IV (1403 † 1427) Duke of Brabant, his eldest son; Philip (1404 † 1430) Duke of Brabant, his younger son
	Philip (1404 † 1430), Count of Ligny and Count of Saint-Pôl, before becoming Duke of Brabant, son of Antoine Quarterly, 1 and 4, azure, three fleurs-de-lys or, a bordure engrailed compony of argent and gules; 2, sable, a lion or, armed and langued gules; 3, argent, a lion gules, armed and langued or.
	Philip (1389 † 1415), Count of Nevers and Rethel, son of Philip the Bold Quarterly, 1 and 4, azure, semé-de-lys or, a bordure compony of argent and gules; 2 and 3, or, a lion sable, armed, crowned and langued gules, then used by: Charles (1414 † 1464), Count of Nevers and Rethel, his eldest son
	John (1415–1491), Count of Etampes, Nevers, Rethel and Eu, younger son of Philip, Count of Nevers and Rethel Quarterly, 1 and 4, azure, semé-de-lys or, a bordure compony of argent and gules, 2 and 3, azure, semé-de-lys or, a label of three points gules, each point charged with three castles or each. Count of Nevers and Rethel: Quarterly, 1 azure, three fleurs-de-lys or, a bordure compony of argent and gules; 2 gules, three rakes or; 3 azure, semé-de-lys or, a label of three points gules, each point charged with three castles or each; 4 sable, a lion or, armed and langued gules.

==== Illegitimate descendants of Philip the Good ====
Figure	Name of Armiger and Blazon
	Philip of Burgundy (1464 † 1524), also called Philippe de Bourgogne-Blaton, son of Philip III of Burgundy, Admiral of the Netherlands (1498–1517), Governor de Guelders and Courtrai, Bishop of Utrecht (1517–1524), Knight of the Golden Fleece Or, arms of Burgundy (that is, of Philip the Good) displayed in chevron brochant.
	Anthony, also called Grand Bastard of Burgundy (1421 † 1504), brother of preceding, Count of La Roche (Ardenne), Grandpré, Sainte-Menehould and Guinness, Lord of Crèvecoeur, Beveren and Tournehem, Knight of the Golden Fleece, Arms of Burgundy (of Philip the Good), differenced by a cottice in bend sinister argent.
	Philip of Burgundy-Beveren ( 1450 † 1498 – Bruges), son of preceding, Lord of Beveren, Count of La Roche (Ardenne), seigneur de la Veere, Admiral of the Netherlands, Governor of Artois, Knight of the Golden Fleece, Quarterly, 1 and 4, Arms of Philip the Good, 2 and 3, barry of eight, or and azure, three annulets gules in chief (La Vieuville).
	Adolf of Burgundy (1489 † 1540 – Beveren), son of preceding, Lord of Beveren, Count of La Roche, Veere and Flessingue, Admiral of the Netherlands, Knight of the Golden Fleece, Quarterly: 1 and 4, the Arms of Philip the Good; 2 and 3, azure, three fleurs-de-lys or, on the chief of a bend gules, a canton or charged with a dolphin azure (for Bourbon-Montpensier); overall sable, a fess argent (de Borselleen), then used by: his son Maximilian II of Burgundy (1514 † 1558), Marquis de Veere and de Flessingue, Lord of Beures, Tournehem and la Fosse, Wescaplo, Poldre, Zandick, Békerke, Brands-Wershamen, Duncland, Laggre-Badt, Admiral of the Netherlands (1540–1558), Stadtholder of Holland, Zeeland and Utrecht (1547–1558), Knight of the Golden Fleece

=== House of Valois-Alençon ===
Figure	Name of Armiger and Blazon
	Charles II (1297 † 1346), Count of Alençon, son of Charles of Valois Azure, semé-de-lys or, a bordure gules charged with 8 plates, then used by: Charles III (1337 † 1375), Count of Alençon, son of Charles II d'Alençon
	Peter II (1340 † 1404), Count of Alençon, son of Charles II Azure, three fleurs-de-lys or, a bordure gules charged with eight plates, then used by his descendants, the Counts of Alençon
	Robert (1344 † 1377), Count of Perche, son of Charles II Dimidiated: azure, semé-de-lys or, a bordure gules charged with plates, a castle or instead of a plate in the dexter chief point; gules, two lions passant guardant or.
	Charles IV (1489 † 1525), Duke of Alençon, Count of Armagnac and Rodez Quarterly, I and IV azure, three fleurs-de-lys or, a bordure gules platy; II and III, grand-quarterly, 1 and 4 argent, a lion gules; 2 and 3 gules, a lion rampant guardant or.

== House of Évreux ==
Arms of Évreux cadet branches

House of Beaumont

Figure	Name of Armiger and Blazon
	Louis (1276 † 1319), Count of Evreux, son of Philip III of France Azure, semé-de-lys or, a bend compony of argent and gules.
	Philip III (1306 † 1343), King of Navarre, Count of Evreux, son of Louis d'Evreux Quarterly, 1 and 4 azure, semé-de-lys or, a bend compony of argent and gules; 2 and 3 gules, chains or linked in orle, cross and saltire, the center point charged with an emerald proper.
	Charles II (1332 † 1387), King of Navarre and Count of Evreux, son of Philippe III d'Evreux Quarterly, 1 and 4 gules, chains or linked in orle, cross and saltire, the center point charged with an emerald proper; 2 and 3 azure, semé-de-lys or, a bend compony of argent and gules, then used by: his son Charles III (1361 † 1425), King of Navarre and Count of Evreux
	Philip, (1336 † 1363), Count of Longueville, son of Philippe III d'Evreux Quarterly, 1 and 4 gules, chains or linked in orle, cross and saltire, the center point charged with an emerald proper; 2 and 3 azure, semé-de-lys or, a bend compony of argent and gules, overall a label argent, then used by: his son Charles III (1361 † 1425), King of Navarre and Count of Evreux
	Blanche of Navarre (1333 † 1398), daughter of Philippe III of Navarre, married in 1349 to Philip VI of France (1293 † 1350) Per pale, azure, semé-de-lys or, per fess, gules, chains or, linked in orle, cross and saltire, charged at the center point with an emerald proper, and azure, semé-de-lys or, a bend compony of argent and gules
	Charles of Navarre (1361 † 1425), before he became King of Navarre (Charles III) in 1387, son of Charles II, King of Navarre. Quarterly, 1 and 4 gules, chains or, linked in orle, cross and saltire, charged at the center with an emerald proper; 2 and 3, azure, semé-de-lys or, a bend compony of argent and gules, overall a label argent.
	Peter of Navarre (1366 † 1412), Count of Mortain, son of Charles II, King of Navarre. Quarterly, 1 and 4 gules, chains or, linked in orle, cross and saltire, charged at the center with an emerald proper; 2 and 3 azure, semé-de-lys or, a bend compony of argent and gules, overall a bordure engrailed argent. Quarterly, 1 and 4 gules, chains or, linked in orle, cross and saltire, charged at the center with an emerald proper; 2 and 3 azure, semé-de-lys or, a bend compony of argent and gules, overall a bordure argent.
	Charles d'Évreux (1305 † 1336), Count of Etampes, son of Louis of Evreux Azure, semé-de-lys or, a bend compony of argent, an ermine spot and gules.
	Louis d'Évreux († 1400), Count of Etampes, son of Charles d'Évreux, Count of Etampes. Azure, semé-de-lys or, a bend compony of argent, an ermine spot and gules, a castle or.

== House of Bourbon ==
Arms of Bourbon cadet branches

Bourbon-La Marche

House of Condé

Royal House of France

House of Orléans

Royal House of Spain

Figure	Name of Armiger and Blazon
	Robert (1256 † 1317), Count of Clermont and Lord of Bourbon, son of Saint Louis, founder of the House of Bourbon Azure, semé-de-lys or, a bend gules, then used by the Dukes of Bourbon until 1420: Louis I, Duke of Bourbon (1280 † 1342); Peter I, Duke of Bourbon (1311 † 1356); Louis II, Duke of Bourbon (1337 † 1410); John I, Duke of Bourbon (1381 † 1434)
	Louis of Clermont (1280 † 1342), eldest son of Robert of Clermont, later known as Louis I, Duke of Bourbon. He used this arms during the lifetime of his father. Azure, semé-de-lys or, on a bend gules a mullet argent.
	Joan of Bourbon (1338 † 1377), daughter of Peter I, married in 1349 to Charles V the Wise (1337 † 1380) Per pale, azure semé-de-lys or and azure semé-de-lys or, a bend gules, then, Per pale, azure three fleurs-de-lys or, and azure three fleurs-de-lys or, a bend gules.
	John I of Bourbon (1381 † 1434), Duke of Bourbon Azure, three fleurs-de-lys or, a bend gules, used by the dukes of Bourbon thereafter
	James of Bourbon (1445 † 1468), son of Charles I, Duke of Bourbon and Auvergne, and Agnes of Burgundy Quarterly, Bourbon and Burgundy (arms of Philip the Good).
	Louis (1398 † 1404), Lord of Beaujolais Azure, three fleurs-de-lys or, a bend gules charged with three dolphins or.
	Peter (1438 † 1503), Count of Beaujeu, son of Charles I of Bourbon Azure, three fleurs-de-lys or, on a bend gules a canton or charged with a lion sable and a label gules.
	Anne (1461 † 1522), Countess of Beaujeu and Regent of France, daughter of Louis XI, King of France Per pale azure, three fleurs-de-lys or, a bend gules and azure, three fleurs-de-lyr or.
	Louis I († 1486), Count of Montpensier, Dauphin of Auvergne, son of John I of Bourbon Before 1428: Azure, three fleurs-de-lys or, a bend engrailed gules. After 1428: Azure, three fleurs-de-lys or, on a bend gules a canton or charged with a dolphin azure.
	Gilbert (1443 † 1496), Count of Montpensier, Dauphin of Auvergne, son of Louis I Qiuarterly 1 and 4 azure, three fleurs-de-lys or, a bend gules; 2 and 3 or, a dolphin azure.

=== House of Bourbon-La Marche ===
Figure	Name of Armiger and Blazon
	James I (1319 † 1362), Count of La Marche, son of Louis I de Bourbon Azure, semé-de-lys or, on a bend gules three lioncels argent (on some sources, lions passant argent), then used by: Peter (1342 † 1362) Count of La Marche, his eldest son; John I (1344 † 1393) Count of La Marche, his younger son
	James II (1370 † 1438), Count of La Marche and King of Naples, son of John I Quarterly, I and IV tierced in pale, 1 barry of eight of argent and gules, 2 argent, a cross potent or cantonned by four crosslets or; 3 azure, semé-de-lys or, a label gules; II and III azure, three fleurs-de-lys or, a bend gules.

House of Bourbon-Vendôme

Figure	Name of Armiger and Blazon
	Louis I (1376 † 1446), Count of Vendôme, son of John I of La Marche Quarterly, 1 and 4 azure, three fleurs-de-lys or, a bend gules; 2 and 3 argent, a chief gules, a lion azure, armed, langued and crowned or, overall on a bend gules three lions argent.
	John VIII (1428 † 1477), Count of Vendôme, son of Louis I Azure, three fleurs-de-lys or, on a bend gules three lions rampants argent, later used by the Counts of Vendôme until 1527, when they inherited the arms of the duke of Bourbon.
	Antoine de Bourbon (1518 † 1562), King of Navarre, Duke of Vendôme Quarterly, 1 and 4 gules, chains or linked in orle, cross and saltire, charged at the center with an emerald proper; 2 azure, three fleurs-de-lys or, a bend gules; 3 or, two cows passant in pale gules, horned, collared and belled azure. Then used by his son Henry of Navarre before he became King of France in 1589.
	Louis (1473 † 1520), Prince of La Roche sur Yon, son of John VIII, Count of Vendôme Azure, three fleurs-de-lys or, a bendlet couped gules charged with a moon increscent argent on the canton, then used by the Dukes of Montpensier.
	Charles (1515 † 1565), prince of la Roche sur Yon, son of Louis Quarterly, 1 and 4 azure, three fleurs-de-lys or, a bendlet couped gules charged with a moon increscent argent on the canton; 2 and 3 azure, three fleurs-de-lys or, a bendlet couped gules.
	Francis I (1491–1545), Count of Saint-Pol, Duke of Estouteville, son of Francis of Vendôme and Marie de Luxembourg Quarterly, 1 and 4 azure, three fleurs-de-lys or, a bend gules; 2 and 3 argent, a lion gueules, the tail forked, looped in saltire, armed, langued and crowned or.
	Francis II (1536–1546), Duke of Estouteville, son of Francis I and Adrienne d'Estouteville Quarterly, 1 and 4 azure, three fleurs-de-lys or, a bend gules; 2 and 3 barry of argent and gules, a lion sable, armed, langued and crowned or.
	Francis (1519–1546), Count of Enghien, son of Charles of Vendôme and Françoise of Alençon Quarterly, 1 and 4 azure, three fleurs-de-lys or, a bend gules; 2 and 3 azure, three fleurs-de-lys or, a bordure gules charged with eight plates, then used by: John (1528–1557), Count of Soissons and Enghien, his brother; Francis (1558–1614), Prince of Conti, their nephew, son of Louis I de Bourbon-Condé

==== Royal House of Bourbon ====
Figure	Name of Armiger and Blazon
	Henri IV of France (1553 † 1610), Since 1562, as Prince of Bearn and Duke of Vendome: Quarterly 1 and 4 Navarre, 2 Bourbon, 3 Béarn. Since 1572, as King of Navarre: Per fess and per three pallets, forming eight quarters: 1 Navarre, 2 Bourbon, 3 quarterly France and Albret, 4 Aragon, 5 quarterly Foix and Béarn, 6 quarterly Armagnac and Rodez, 7 Evreux, 8 quarterly Castile and Leon. Inescutcheon Bigorre. Since 1589, as King of France and Navarre: Per pale, azure three fleurs-de-lys or and gules, chains or linked in orle, cross and saltire, charged at the center with an emerald proper, borne by all Kings of France until 1830.
	Gaston, Duke of Orléans (1608 † 1660), Duke of Orléans, son of Henri IV Philippe, Duke of Orléans (1640 † 1701), Duke of Orléans, son of Louis XIII Azure three fleurs de lys or, a label argent, borne by all Dukes of Orléans onwards.
	Elisabeth of France (1602 † 1644), Queen of Spain, daughter of Henry IV, married in 1615 to Philip IV of Spain (1605 † 1665) Per pale, quarterly 1 and 4 gules, a castle or, with gates and windows azure; 2 and 3 argent, a lion gules armed, langued and crowned or, enté en pointe argent, a pomegranate proper seeded gules, supported, sculpted and slipped vert; azure, three fleurs-de-lys or.
	Louis of France (1682–1712), Duke of Burgundy, later Dauphin of Viennois (1711–1712), son of the 'Grand Dauphin, grandson of Louis XIV. until 1711: Quarterly, 1 and 4 azure, three fleurs-de-lys d'or (France), 2 and 3 bendy or and azure of six, a bordure gules (Burgundy) 1711–1712: Quarterly, 1 and 4, azure, three fleurs-dy-lys or, 2 and 3 or, a dolphin hauriant azure Father of Louis XV.
	Philip V of Spain (1683–1746), Duke of Anjou, later King of Spain, (from 1700, as Felipe V), son of the 'Grand Dauphin', grandson of Louis XIV before 1700: azure three fleurs-de-lys or, a bordure gules Ancestor of the Royal family of Spain and the Grand-Ducal family of Luxembourg, also the former ruling houses of the Two Sicilies and Parma.
	Louis Stanislas Xavier (1755 † 1824) (son of Louis (1729–1765), Dauphin of France), Count of Provence, Duke of Anjou, Count of Maine, Perche, and Senonches, Duke of Alençon and Brunoy, Peer of France, then King of France as Louis XVIII Azure, three fleurs-de-lys or, a bordure engrailed gules. Also used Azure, three fleurs-de-lys or, a bordure indented gules. And Quarterly, 1 and 4 azure, three fleurs-de-lys or; 2 and 3 azure, a fleur-de-lys or
	Charles (1686 † 1714), Duke of Berry, son of the 'Grand Dauphin', grandson of Louis XIV Azure, three fleur-de-lys or a bordure engrailed gules.
	Charles-Ferdinand (1778 † 1820), Duke of Berry, son of Charles X Azure three fleur-de-lys or, a bordure enbattled gules
	Charlotte Marie Augustine de Bourbon (1808–1886), daughter of Charles Ferdinand d'Artois, Countess of Issoudun, Princess of Faucigny-Lucinge. Azure a pairle couped between three fleurs-de-lys or, on a chief engrailed of the second three fleurs-de-lys of the first.
	Louise Charlotte Marie de Bourbon (1809–1891), daughter of Charles Ferdinand of Artois, Countess of Vierzon, Baroness of Charette. Azure a tower inclined argent, on a chief engrailed or three fleurs-de-lys azure.
	César (1594 † 1665), Duke of Vendôme, illegitimate son of Henri IV azure three fleurs-de-lys or, a baton sinister gules, borne also by: his descendants, the Dukes of Vendôme; the illegitimate sons of Louis XIV: Louis Auguste, Duke of Maine (1670–1736); Louis Alexandre, Count of Toulouse (1678–1737); Louis Jean Marie de Bourbon (1725–1793), Count of Penthièvre, son of the Count of Toulouse.

===== Spanish House of Bourbon =====
Figure	Name of Armiger and Blazon
	Philip (1683 † 1746), Duke of Anjou, then King of Spain (1700, under the name Philip V), son of the Grand Dauphin, grandson of Louis XIV. Quarterly, I grand-quarterly 1 and 4 gules, a three-towered castle or, masoned sable and ajouré azure (for Castile); 2 and 3 argent, a lion rampant purpure crowned or, langued and armed gules (for Leon); grafted in point argent a pomegranate proper seeded gules, supported, sculpted and slipped vert (for Granada); II per pale or, four pallets gules (for Aragon), and per saltire or, four pallets gules and argent an eagle displayed sable (for Sicily); III per fess gules, a fess argent (for Austria); bendy of six or and azure, a bordure gules (for Burgundy); IV per fess, azure, semé-de-lys or, a bordure compony of argent and gules (for Valois-Burgundy); sable a lion rampant or langued and armed gules (for Brabant). Grafted in point, per pale or, a lion rampant sable armed and langued gules (for Flanders); argent an eagle displayed gules, armed, beaked, and langued or (for Tyrol). Overall an inescutcheon azure, three fleurs-de-lys or, a bordure gules (for Anjou). Quarterly of six, three rows of two: I per pale or, four pallets gules and per saltire, or, four pallets gules and argent, an eagle sable; II per pale gules, a fess argent and azure, semé-de-lys or, a bordure compony of argent and gules; III azure, séme-de-lys or, a label gules; IV or, six roundels one, two, two and one, that in chief azure, three fleurs-de-lys or, the rest gules; V bendy of six, or and azure, a bordure gules; VI sable, a lion or, armed and langued gules. Grafted in point, per pale, or, a lion sable, armed and langued gules, and argent, an eagle displayed gules, membered and beaked or. Overall, an inescutcheon, quarterly, 1 and 4 gules, a three-towered castle or, masoned sable and ajouré azure; 2 and 3 argent, a lion rampant purpure crowned or, langued and armed gules; grafted in point argent a pomegranate proper seeded gules, supported, sculpted and slipped vert; Inescutcheon, azure, three fleurs-de-lys or, a bordure gules, then used by: Louis I (1707 † 1724), King of Spain; Ferdinand VI (1713 † 1759), King of Spain; Small Shield of Spain: quarterly, 1 and 4 gules, a three-towered castle or, masoned sable and ajouré azure; 2 and 3 argent, a lion rampant purpure crowned or, langued and armed gules; grafted in point argent a pomegranate proper seeded gules, supported, sculpted and slipped vert; Inescutcheon, azure, three fleurs-de-lys or, a bordure gules then used by: Philip V (1683 † 1746), Louis I (1707 † 1724), King of Spain; Ferdinand VI (1713 † 1759), King of Spain; Charles III (1716 † 1788), Charles IV (1748 † 1819), King of Spain; Ferdinand VII (1784 † 1833), King of Spain; Isabella II (1830 † 1904), Queen of Spain; Alfonso XII(1857 † 1885), King of Spain; Alfonso XIII (1886 † 1941), King of Spain, until 1931,
	Charles de Bourbon (1716 † 1788), King of Naples and Sicily (1738–1759), King of Spain, (as Charles III), son of Philip V, King of Spain. Quarterly of six, three rows of two: I per pale or, four pallets gules and per saltire, or, four pallets gules and argent, an eagle sable; II per pale gules, a fess argent and azure, semé-de-lys or, a bordure compony of argent and gules; III or, six fleurs-de-lys azure, three, two and one; IV or, six roundels one, two, two and one, that in chief azure, three fleurs-de-lys or, the rest gules; V bendy of six, or and azure, a bordure gules; VI sable, a lion or, armed and langued gules. Grafted in point, per pale, or, a lion sable, armed and langued gules, and argent, an eagle displayed gules, membered and beaked or. Overall, an inescutcheon, quarterly, 1 and 4 gules, a three-towered castle or, masoned sable and ajouré azure; 2 and 3 argent, a lion rampant purpure crowned or, langued and armed gules; grafted in point argent a pomegranate proper seeded gules, supported, sculpted and slipped vert; Inescutcheon, azure, three fleurs-de-lys or, a bordure gules, then used by: Charles IV (1748 † 1819), King of Spain; Ferdinand VII (1784 † 1833), King of Spain; Isabella II (1830 † 1904), Queen of Spain; Alfonso XII(1857 † 1885), King of Spain
	Alfonso XII(1857 † 1885), King of Spain. The Spanish Bourbons became senior male representatives of Hugh Capet after the death of the Count of Chambord in 1883. However, the senior male agnate was actually the Carlist claimant. In any case, in lieu of that Alfonso removed the red bordure of Anjou. Quarterly of six, three rows of two: I per pale or, four pallets gules and per saltire, or, four pallets gules and argent, an eagle sable; II per pale gules, a fess argent and azure, semé-de-lys or, a bordure compony of argent and gules; III or, six fleurs-de-lys azure, three, two and one; IV or, six roundels one, two, two and one, that in chief azure, three fleurs-de-lys or, the rest gules; V bendy of six, or and azure, a bordure gules; VI sable, a lion or, armed and langued gules. Grafted in point, per pale, or, a lion sable, armed and langued gules, and argent, an eagle displayed gules, membered and beaked or. Overall, an inescutcheon, quarterly, 1 and 4 gules, a three-towered castle or, masoned sable and ajouré azure; 2 and 3 argent, a lion rampant purpure crowned or, langued and armed gules; grafted in point argent a pomegranate proper seeded gules, supported, sculpted and slipped vert; Inescutcheon, azure, three fleurs-de-lys or, then used by: Alfonso XIII (1886 † 1941), King of Spain, before 1931
	King Alfonso XIII after 1931. In 1931 Alfonso XIII did away with the distinction between state and personal arms by combining the two (see Spanish Royal Arms). He took the arms of Charles III, that he had been using, and substituted the Aragon quarter with Jerusalem, as the Aragon quarter was on the national arms. The national arms replaced the former inescutcheon of just Castile, Leon and Granada alone, with the inescutcheon of France overall. Quarterly 1 gules, a castle or masoned and ajouré azure; 2 argent a lion purpure armed, langued and crowned or; 3 or, four pallets gules; 4 gules, chains or linked in orle, cross and saltire, charged at the center with an emerald proper. Grafted in point a pomegranate proper seeded gules, supported, sculpted and slipped vert. Overall an inescutcheon azure, three fleurs-de-lys or. Grande Arms: Quarterly of six, three rows of two: I per pale or, four pallets gules and per saltire, or, four pallets gules and argent, an eagle sable (Sicily); et en d'argent à la croix potencé d'or (Jerusalem); II per pale gules, a fess argent and azure, semé-de-lys or, a bordure compony of argent and gules; (Austria/Burgundy modern) III or, six fleurs-de-lys azure, three, two and one; (Farnese/Parma) IV or, six roundels one, two, two and one, that in chief azure, three fleurs-de-lys or, the rest gules (Medici/Tuscany); V bendy of six, or and azure, a bordure gules; (Burgundy ancient) VI sable, a lion or, armed and langued gules.(Brabant) Grafted in point, per pale, or, a lion sable, armed and langued gules,(Flanders) and argent, an eagle displayed gules, membered and beaked or.(Tyrol) Overall, an inescutcheon, quarterly 1 gules, a castle or masoned and ajouré azure,(Castile) 2 argent a lion purpure armed, langued and crowned or,(Leon) 3 or, four pallets gules, (Aragon) 4 gules, chains or linked in orle, cross and saltire, charged at the center with an emerald proper; (Navarre) grafted in point a pomegranate proper seeded gules, supported, sculpted and slipped vert.(Granada) Overall, an inescutcheon azure, three fleurs-de-lys or, (France modern)
	Juan, Count of Barcelona (1913 † 1993), de jure King of Spain (1931–1977). Don Juan was the 3rd son of Alfonso XIII, and his designated successor. By this time the Carlist line had died out also, so the Spanish royal family were in fact the senior representatives of Hugh Capet. However, Don Juan, as the younger brother, was not. That belonged to his elder brother, Jaime, Duke of Segovia, who also renounced his rights to the Spanish throne as he was born deaf. The claim as senior agnate of Hugh Capet is continued by his descendant, Louis Alphonse, Duke of Anjou, who claims the French Throne. In lieu of this, Don Juan reinstituted the red bordure of Anjou on the French royal arms. Don Juan formally renounced his rights to his son King Juan Carlos I in 1977. Quarterly 1 gules, a castle or masoned and ajouré azure, 2 argent a lion purpure armed, langued and crowned or, 3 or, four pallets gules, 4 gules, chains or linked in orle, cross and saltire, charged at the center with an emerald proper; grafted in point a pomegranate proper seeded gules, supported, sculpted and slipped vert. Overall, an inescutcheon azure, three fleurs-de-lys or, a bordure gules then Grand Arms: Quarterly of six, three rows of two: I per pale or, four pallets gules and per saltire, or, four pallets gules and argent, an eagle sable (Sicily); et en d'argent à la croix potencé d'or (Jerusalem); II per pale gules, a fess argent and azure, semé-de-lys or, a bordure compony of argent and gules; (Austria/Burgundy modern) III or, six fleurs-de-lys azure, three, two and one; (Farnese/Parma) IV or, six roundels one, two, two and one, that in chief azure, three fleurs-de-lys or, the rest gules (Medici/Tuscany); V bendy of six, or and azure, a bordure gules; (Burgundy ancient) VI sable, a lion or, armed and langued gules.(Brabant) Grafted in point, per pale, or, a lion sable, armed and langued gules,(Flanders) and argent, an eagle displayed gules, membered and beaked or.(Tyrol) Overall, an inescutcheon, quarterly 1 gules, a castle or masoned and ajouré azure,(Castile) 2 argent a lion purpure armed, langued and crowned or,(Leon) 3 or, four pallets gules, (Aragon) 4 gules, chains or linked in orle, cross and saltire, charged at the center with an emerald proper; (Navarre) grafted in point a pomegranate proper seeded gules, supported, sculpted and slipped vert.(Granada) Overall, an inescutcheon azure, three fleurs-de-lys or, a bordure gules,(Anjou modern) used by: Juan Carlos I, (1938 – † ), King of Spain (1975–2014); Felipe VI (1968 – † ), King of Spain (2014 – )
	Felipe, Prince of Asturias (born 1968) Quarterly 1 gules, a castle or masoned and ajouré azure, 2 argent a lion purpure armed, langued and crowned or, 3 or, four pallets gules, 4 gules, chains or linked in orle, cross and saltire, charged at the center with an emerald proper; grafted in point a pomegranate proper seeded gules, supported, sculpted and slipped vert; Overall, an inescutcheon azure, three fleurs-de-lys or, a bordure gules. On chief, a label azure. used by: Felipe VI as Heir-Apparent and Prince of Asturias, (1968–); Leonor, Princess of Asturias (2005 – † )
	Francisco de Asis, King consort of Spain (1822 † 1902), married Isabella II, son of Infante Francisco de Paula of Spain, grandson of Charles IV, King of Spain. Quarterly 1 and 4, gules, a castle or masoned and ajouré azure; 2 and 3 argent a lion purpure armed, langued and crowned or, grafted in point argent, a pomegranate proper seeded gules, supported, sculpted and slipped vert. Overall, an inescutcheon azure, three fleurs-de-lys or, a bordure gules.
	Carlist pretenders after 1883. Quarterly 1 and 4, gules, a castle or masoned and ajouré azure; 2 and 3 argent a lion purpure armed, langued and crowned or, grafted in point a pomegranate proper seeded gules, supported, sculpted and slipped vert. Overall azure, three fleurs-de-lys or. At the death of Henri, Count of Chambord, the Carlist pretender became the senior legitimate male of the House of Bourbon, and so claimed the plain arms of France in his inescutcheon.
	Alphonse de Bourbon (1936 † 1989), Duke of Anjou and Cadiz, son of Infante Jaime of Spain, grandson of Alfonso XIII. Per pale, azure, three fleurs-de-lys; quarterly, 1 gules, a castle or masoned and ajouré azure; 2 argent, a lion gules armed, langued and crowned or; 3 or, four pallets gules; 4 gules, chains or linked in orle, cross and saltire, charged at the center with an emerald proper. Grafted in point a pomegranate proper seeded gules, supported, sculpted and slipped vert.
	Gonzalo de Bourbon (1937 † 2000),Duke of Aquitaine, son of Infante Jaime of Spain, grandson of Alfonso XIII. Quarterly: 1 and 4, azure, three fleurs-de-lys or, a bordure engrailed gules; 2 and 3, gules, a lion passant or.
	Louis de Bourbon (born 1974), Duke of Anjou , son of Alphonse de Bourbon. Azure, three fleurs-de-lys or.
	Louis de Bourbon (born 2010), Dauphin of France and Duke of Burgundy son of Louis de Bourbon. Quarterly 1 and 4 azure, three fleurs-de-lys or; 2 and 3 or, a dolphin azure, crested, barbed, finned, with scales and gills gules.
	Alphonse de Bourbon (born 2010), Duke of Berry , son of Louis de Bourbon. Azure, three fleurs-de-lys or, a bordure embattled gules.
	Francisco de Borbón y Escasany (born 1943), 5th Duke of Seville, Grandee of Spain, Grandmaster of the reunited branches of the Order of Saint Lazarus Quarterly Order of Saint Lazarus and Anjou.

====== House of Bourbon-Two Sicilies ======
Figure	Name of Armiger and Blazon
	Bourbon-Sicily, King of Two Sicilies. Tierced in pale, I per fess, or, six fleurs-de-lys azure, in three, two and one, (for Farnèse) and argent, five escutcheons azure in cross, the two on the sides couched, each charged with five plates in saltire, within a bordure gules seven three-towered castles or, masoned and ajouré azure (for Portugal); II per fess, quarterly 1 and 4, gules, a castle or masoned and ajouré azure (for Castile); 2 and 3 argent, a lion gules armed, langued and crowned or (for Leon); azure, semé-de-lys or, a label gules (for Naples) and III or, six roundels one, two, two and one, that in chief azure, three fleurs-de-lys or, the rest gules (for Tuscany). Overall an inescutcheon, azure, three fleurs-de-lys or, a bordure gules, (for Anjou).
	Grand arms of the Bourbon kings of Two Sicilies. Tierced in pale: I, quarterly: 1 and 4, or, six fleurs-de-lys azure, in three, two and one, (for Farnèse); 2 and 3, per pale, gules, a fess argent (for Austria) and bendy of six, or and azure, a bordure gules (for Burgundy); overall argent, five escutcheons in cross azure, each charged with five plates in saltire, a bordure gules charged with seven three-towered castles or, masoned and ajouré azure (for Portugal); II, tierced in fess: 1 per pale, quarterly i and iv gules, a three-towered castle or, masoned and ajouré azure (for Castile); ii and iii argent, a lion purpure (for Léon); per pale or, four pallets gules (for Aragon) and per saltire or, four pallets gules and argent, an eagle sable (for Sicily). Grafted in point argent a pomegranate proper seeded gules, supported, sculpted and slipped vert (for Granada); 2 per pale gules, a fess argent (for Austria) and azure, semé-de-lys or, a bordure compony of gules and argent (for Valois-Burgundy), 3 quarterly i per bend sinister bendy of six or and azure, a bordure gules (for Burgundy) and or, a lion sable, armed and langued gules (for Flanders); ii per bend sable, a lion or, armed and langued gules (for Brabant) and argent, an eagle gules (for Tyrol); iii azure, semé-de-lys d'or, a label gules (for Naples) and iv argent, a cross potent or cantonned by four crosslets or (for Jerusalem); III, or, six roundels one, two, two and one, that in chief azure, three fleurs-de-lys or, the rest gules (for Tuscany); Overall azure, three fleurs-de-lys or, two and one, a bordure gules (for Anjou).
	Maria Amalia of Naples and Sicily (1782 † 1866), married in 1809 to Louis-Philippe I (1773 † 1850), King of the French Two shields coupled: that of Bourbon-Orléans (azure, three fleurs-de-lys or, a label argent) and that of Bourbon-Sicily (Tierced in pale I, quarterly: 1 and 4, or, six fleurs-de-lys azure, in three, two and one, (for Farnèse); 2 and 3, per pale gules, a fess argent (for Austria) and bendy of six, or and azure, a bordure gules (for Burgundy); overall argent, five escutcheons in cross azure, each charged with five plates in saltire, a bordure gules charged with seven three-towered castles or, masoned and ajouré azure (for Portugal); II, tierced per fess, I per pale quarterly 1 and 4 gules, a three-towered castle or, masoned and ajouré azure (for Castile); 2 and 3 argent, a lion purpure (for Léon); per pale or, four pallets gules (for Aragon) and per saltire or, four pallets gules and argent, an eagle sable (for Sicily). Grafted in point argent a pomegranate proper seeded gules, supported, sculpted and slipped vert (for Granada); II per pale gules, a fess argent (for Austria) and azure, semé-de-lys or, a bordure compony of gules and argent (for Valois-Burgundy); III quarterly 1 per bend sinister bendy of six or and azure, a bordure gules (for Burgundy) and or, a lion sable, armed and langued gules (for Flanders); 2 per bend sable, a lion or, armed and langued gules (for Brabant) and argent, an eagle gules (for Tyrol); 3 azure, semé-de-lys d'or, a label gules (for Naples); 4 argent, a cross potent or cantonned by four crosslets or (for Jerusalem); III, or, six roundels one, two, two and one, that in chief azure, three fleurs-de-lys or, the rest gules (for Tuscany). Overall azure, three fleurs-de-lys or, two and one, a bordure gules (for Anjou)).
	1829-1868/1878: Maria Christina of the Two Sicilies (1806 † 1878), married in 1829 to Ferdinand VII (1784 † 1833), King of Spain Two shields coupled: 1) Quarterly of six, three rows of two: I per pale or, four pallets gules and per saltire, or, four pallets gules and argent, an eagle sable; II gules, a fess argent and azure, semé-de-lys or, a bordure compony of argent and gules; III or, six fleurs-de-lys azure, three, two and one; IV or, six roundels one, two, two and one, that in chief azure, three fleurs-de-lys or, the rest gules; V bendy of six, or and azure, a bordure gules; VI sable, a lion or, armed and langued gules. Grafted in point, per pale, or, a lion sable, armed and langued gules, and argent, an eagle displayed gules, membered and beaked or. Overall, an inescutcheon, quarterly, 1 and 4 gules, a three-towered castle or, masoned sable and ajouré azure; 2 and 3 argent, a lion rampant purpure crowned or, langued and armed gules; grafted in point argent a pomegranate proper seeded gules, supported, sculpted and slipped vert; Inescutcheon, azure, three fleurs-de-lys or, a bordure gules and 2) Tierced in pale, I per fess, or, six fleurs-de-lys azure, in three, two and one, (for Farnèse) and argent, five escutcheons azure in cross, the two on the sides couched, each charged with five plates in saltire, within a bordure gules seven three-towered castles or, masoned and ajouré azure (for Portugal); II per fess, quarterly 1 and 4, gules, a castle or masoned and ajouré azure (for Castile); 2 and 3 argent, a lion gules armed, langued and crowned or (for Leon); azure, semé-de-lys or, a label gules (for Naples) and III or, six roundels one, two, two and one, that in chief azure, three fleurs-de-lys or, the rest gules (for Tuscany). Overall an inescutcheon, azure, three fleurs-de-lys or, a bordure gules, (for Anjou).
	1941–2000: Princess María de las Mercedes of Bourbon-Two Sicilies (1910 † 2000), wife of Juan de Borbón (1913 † 1993), pretender to the Spanish throne 1941–1977 (As the Pretender's Consort): Per pale I, quarterly 1 gules, a castle or masoned and ajouré azure, which is of Castile, 2 argent a lion purpure armed, langued and crowned or, which is of León, 3 or, four pallets gules, which is of Aragon, 4 gules, chains or linked in orle, cross and saltire, charged at the center with an emerald proper, which is of Navarre, grafted in point a pomegranate proper seeded gules, supported, sculpted and slipped vert, which is of Granada overall azure, three fleurs-de-lys or, which is of France and II, quarterly I per pale of two, 1 per fess or, six fleurs-de-lys azure, in three, two and one, (for Farnèse) and argent, five escutcheons azure in cross, the two on the sides couched, each charged with five plates in saltire, within a bordure gules nine three-towered castles or, masoned and ajouré azure (which is of Portugal), 2 per fess quarterly 1 and 4, gules, a castle or masoned and ajouré azure (for Castile) and 2 and 3 argent, a lion gules armed, langued and crowned or (for Leon) and azure, semé-de-lys or, a label gules (for Naples) and 3 or, six roundels one, two, two and one, that in chief azure, three fleurs-de-lys or, the rest gules (for Tuscany); overall azure, three fleurs-de-lys or, a bordure gules (for Anjou). 1977–2000 (After her husband renounce): Per pale I, quarterly 1 gules, a castle or masoned and ajouré azure, which is of Castile, 2 argent a lion purpure armed, langued and crowned or, which is of León, 3 or, four pallets gules, which is of Aragon, 4 gules, chains or linked in orle, cross and saltire, charged at the center with an emerald proper, which is of Navarre, grafted in point a pomegranate proper seeded gules, supported, sculpted and slipped vert, which is of Granada overall azure, three fleurs-de-lys or, a bordure gules, which is of Anjou and II, quarterly I per pale of two, 1 per fess or, six fleurs-de-lys azure, in three, two and one, (for Farnèse) and argent, five escutcheons azure in cross, the two on the sides couched, each charged with five plates in saltire, within a bordure gules nine three-towered castles or, masoned and ajouré azure (which is of Portugal), 2 per fess quarterly 1 and 4, gules, a castle or masoned and ajouré azure (for Castile) and 2 and 3 argent, a lion gules armed, langued and crowned or (for Leon) and azure, semé-de-lys or, a label gules (for Naples) and 3 or, six roundels one, two, two and one, that in chief azure, three fleurs-de-lys or, the rest gules (for Tuscany); overall azure, three fleurs-de-lys or, a bordure gules (for Anjou).

====== House of Bourbon-Parma ======
Figure	Name of Armiger and Blazon
	Lesser arms of the Bourbon Dukes of Parma from 1748 to the present Azure, three fleurs-de-lys or, a bordure gules charged with eight escallops argent.
	Dukes of Bourbon-Parma from 1748 to 1802 Per pale 1, or, six fleurs-de-lys azure in three, two and one and 2, argent, a cross pattée gules cantonned by four eagles sable with wings inverted. Overall, quarterly 1 and 4, gules, a castle or masoned and ajouré azure; 2 and 3 argent, a lion gules armed, langued and crowned or, grafted in point a pomegranate proper, seeded gules, supported, sculpted and slipped vert. Overall azure, three fleurs-de-lys or, a bordure gules charged with eight escallops argent.
	Maria Luisa of Parma (1751 † 1819), married in 1765 to Charles IV (1748 † 1819), King of Spain Two shields coupled: these being 1) Quarterly of six, three rows of two: I per pale or, four pallets gules and per saltire, or, four pallets gules and argent, an eagle sable; II gules, a fess argent and azure, semé-de-lys or, a bordure compony of argent and gules; III or, six fleurs-de-lys azure, three, two and one; IV or, six roundels one, two, two and one, that in chief azure, three fleurs-de-lys or, the rest gules; V bendy of six, or and azure, a bordure gules; VI sable, a lion or, armed and langued gules. Grafted in point, per pale, or, a lion sable, armed and langued gules, and argent, an eagle displayed gules, membered and beaked or. Overall, an inescutcheon, quarterly, 1 and 4 gules, a three-towered castle or, masoned sable and ajouré azure; 2 and 3 argent, a lion rampant purpure crowned or, langued and armed gules; grafted in point argent a pomegranate proper seeded gules, supported, sculpted and slipped vert; Inescutcheon, azure, three fleurs-de-lys or, a bordure gules and 2) Per pale 1, or, six fleurs-de-lys azure in three, two and one and 2, argent, a cross pattée gules cantonned by four eagles sable with wings inverted. Overall, quarterly 1 and 4, gules, a castle or masoned and ajouré azure; 2 and 3 argent, a lion gules armed, langued and crowned or, grafted in point a pomegranate proper, seeded gules, supported, sculpted and slipped vert. Overall azure, three fleurs-de-lys or, a bordure gules charged with eight escallops argent.
	Kings of Etruria from 1802 to 1807 Quarterly: 1 or, six fleurs-de-lys azure in three, two and one (for Farnèse); 2, argent, a cross pattée gules cantonned by four eagles sable with wings inverted (for Mantua); 3, or, on a bend gules three alérions argent (which is Lorraine); 4, gules, a fess argent (for Austria); overall, quarterly 1 and 4, gules, a castle or masoned and ajouré azure (for Castile); 2 and 3 argent, a lion gules armed, langued and crowned or (for Leon); inescutcheon, per pale azure, three fleurs-de-lys or (for France) and or, six roundels one, two, two and one, that in chief azure, three fleurs-de-lys or, the rest gules (for Tuscany).
	Dukes of Lucca from 1815 to 1824 Quarterly, 1. per pales Medici and Farnese, 2. quarterly Castile and León, 3. Gonzaga (for Guastalla), 4. per pale Austria and Lorraine. En surtout per fess argent and gules a panther rampant or (Lucca), en surtout Azure, three fleur de lys Or, on a bordure gules eight escallops argent (For Bourbon-Parma).
	Dukes of Lucca from 1824 to 1847 Quarterly 1 and 4 per fess argent and gules (for Lucca), 2 and 3 Grand Quarter 1 and 4, gules, a castle or masoned and ajouré azure (for Castile); 2 and 3 argent, a lion gules armed, langued and crowned or (for Leon)en surtout Azure, three fleur de lys Or, on a bordure gules eight escallops argent (for Bourbon-Parma).
	Dukes of Bourbon-Parma from 1847 to the present Quarterly of nine: – 1, or, six fleurs-de-lys azure in three, two and one (for Farnèse), – 2, per pale argent, a cross pattée gules cantonned by four eagles sable with wings inverted (for Gonzaga) and azure, a lion bendy of argent and gueules (for Rossi) – 3, per pale or, six roundels one, two, two and one, that in chief azure, three fleurs-de-lys or, the rest gules (for Tuscany) and per fess gules over or, the or charged with a tree argent, the branches and leaves on gules (for Malaspina) – 4 argent an eagle sable ([or] for Savoy ancien) charged at the heart with an escutcheon gules a cross argent (for Savoy moderne) – 5 in an escutcheon, quarterly 1 and 4, gules, a castle or masoned and ajouré azure (for Castile); 2 and 3 argent, a lion gules armed, langued and crowned or (for Leon), grafted in point overall a pomegranate proper seeded gules, supported, sculpted and slipped vert (for Granada); overall azure, three fleurs-de-lys or, on a bordure gules eight escallops argent (for Bourbon-Parma) – 6 gules, a fess argent (for Corregio) – 7 chequy of nine argent and gules, on chief an eagle sable (for Pallavicini) – 8 gules, a cross or cantonned by four B's addorsed or (for Paleologos) – 9 quarterly: 1 and 4, paly of or and azure, a fess argent; 2 and 3, barry wavy or and azur (for Landi)
	Alicia of Bourbon-Parma (1917 † 2017), Infanta of Spain, Duchess dowager of Calabria, wife of Alfonso of Bourbon-Two Sicilies (1901 † 1964), pretender to the throne of Two-Sicilies and Infanta of Spain Impaled: that of Bourbon-Sicily (Tierced in pale I, quarterly: 1 and 4, or, six fleurs-de-lys azure, in three, two and one, (for Farnèse); 2 and 3, per pale gules, a fess argent (for Austria) and bendy of six, or and azure, a bordure gules (for Burgundy); overall argent, five escutcheons in cross azure, each charged with five plates in saltire, a bordure gules charged with eight three-towered castles or, masoned and ajouré azure (for Portugal); II, tierced per fess, I per pale quarterly 1 and 4 gules, a three-towered castle or, masoned and ajouré azure (for Castile); 2 and 3 argent, a lion purpure (for Léon); per pale or, four pallets gules (for Aragon) and per saltire or, four pallets gules and argent, an eagle sable (for Sicily). Grafted in point argent a pomegranate proper seeded gules, supported, sculpted and slipped vert (for Granada); II per pale gules, a fess argent (for Austria) and azure, semé-de-lys or, a bordure compony of gules and argent (for Valois-Burgundy); III quarterly 1 per bend sinister bendy of six or and azure, a bordure gules (for Burgundy) and or, a lion sable, armed and langued gules (for Flanders); 2 per bend sable, a lion or, armed and langued gules (for Brabant) and argent, an eagle gules (for Tyrol); 3 azure, semé-de-lys d'or, a label gules (for Naples); 4 argent, a cross potent or cantonned by four crosslets or (for Jerusalem); III, or, six roundels one, two, two and one, that in chief azure, three fleurs-de-lys or, the rest gules (for Tuscany). Overall azure, three fleurs-de-lys or, two and one, a bordure gules (for Anjou)) with that of Bourbon-Parma (Quarterly of nine: 1, or, six fleurs-de-lys azure in three, two and one (for Farnèse); 2, per pale argent, a cross pattée gules cantonned by four eagles sable with wings inverted (for Gonzaga) and azure, a lion bendy of argent and gueules (for Rossi); 3, per pale or, six roundels one, two, two and one, that in chief azure, three fleurs-de-lys or, the rest gules (for Tuscany) and per fess gules over or, the or charged with a tree argent, the branches and leaves on gules (for Malaspina); 4 argent an eagle sable ([or] for Savoy ancien) charged at the heart with an escutcheon gules a cross argent (for Savoy moderne); 5 in an escutcheon, quarterly 1 and 4, gules, a castle or masoned and ajouré azure (for Castile); 2 and 3 argent, a lion gules armed, langued and crowned or (for Leon), grafted in point overall a pomegranate proper seeded gules, supported, sculpted and slipped vert (for Granada); overall azure, three fleurs-de-lys or, on a bordure gules eight escallops argent (for Bourbon-Parma); 6 gules, a fess argent (for Corregio); 7 chequy of nine argent and gules, on chief an eagle sable (for Pallavicini); 8 gules, a cross or cantonned by four B's addorsed or (for Paleologos); 9 quarterly: 1 and 4, paly of or and azure, a fess argent; 2 and 3, barry wavy or and azur (for Landi)).
	House de Bourbon de Parme in the Netherlands, from 1996 to the present The noble family De Bourbon de Parme is a branch of the royal and ducal house Bourbon-Parma house. Since 1996 some members also belong to the Dutch nobility as Prince or Princess de Bourbon de Parme. By Royal Decree of 15 May 1996, the four children of Princess Irene of the Netherlands (born 1939) and Carlos Hugo, Duke of Parma (1930–2010) were incorporated into the Dutch nobility under the Nobility Act as descending from the noble house of Bourbon-Parma. This happened for the two sons, Prince Carlos, Duke of Parma and Prince Jaime, with the title of prince on all, and for the two daughters, Princess Margarita and Princess Carolina, with the title of princess "for her person only". Azure, three fleurs-de-lys or, a bordure gules charged with eight escallops argent.

House of Bourbon-Parma-Luxembourg

Figure	Name of Armiger and Blazon
	Jean de Luxembourg, Grand Duke of Luxembourg (1964–2000), son of Charlotte, Grand Duchess of Luxembourg and Prince Felix of Bourbon-Parma Arms at his majority (1939): Quarterly: I and IV azure, three fleurs-de-lys or, a bordure gules (for Bourbon-Spain); II and III azure billety or, a lion crowned or, armed and langued gules (for Nassau); Inescutcheon barry of ten argent and azure, a lion gules with a forked tail looped in saltire, armed, langued and crowned or (for Luxembourg). Arms during his marriage to Princess Joséphine-Charlotte of Belgium (1953): Per pale, I azure billety or a lion crowned or armed and langued gules (for Nassau); II barry of ten argent and azure a lion gules with a forked tail looped in saltire, armed, langued and crowned or (for Luxembourg); overall, in middle base point, azure, three fleur-de-lys or, a bordure gules charged with eight escallops argent (for Bourbon-Parma). At his accession (1964), he adopted the Arms of Dominion of Luxembourg: Quarterly I and IV barry of ten argent and azure, a lion gules with a forked tail looped in saltire, armed, langued and crowned or (for Luxembourg); II and III azure billety or, a lion crowned or armed and langued gules (for Nassau).
	Henri de Luxembourg, Grand Duke of Luxembourg (2000–2025), son of preceding, Arms prior to his accession: Quarterly I and IV barry of ten argent and azure, a lion gules with a forked tail looped in saltire, armed, langued and crowned or (for Luxembourg); II and III azure billety or, a lion crowned or armed and langued gules (for Nassau), differenced by a Label of three points Argent. Arms from his accession, 2000: Quarterly, 1 and 4 barry of ten azure and argent, a lion with forked tail gules, armed, langued and crowned or, 2 and 3 azure, billetty or, a lion or armed and langued gules, crowned or, overall azure, three fleurs-de-lys or, on a bordure gules eight escallops argent

===== Bourbon House of Orléans =====
Figure	Name of Armiger and Blazon
	Philippe de France, (1640–1701), Duke of Orleans, son of King Louis XIII. Initially Duke of Anjou, he was created Duke of Orléans by his brother Louis XIV after the death of their uncle Gaston: Azure, three fleurs-de-lys or, a label argent, then used by his male-line descendants until 1830; Philippe II, Duke of Orleans, (1674–1723), Regent of France (1715–1723), Prime Minister of France (1723); Louis d'Orléans, Duke of Orléans (1703–1752); Louis Philippe I, Duke of Orleans (1725–1785); Louis Philippe II, Duke of Orleans (1747–1793)(Philippe Égalité) (executed); Louis Philippe III, Duke of Orleans (1773–1850), King of the French as Louis Philippe I (1830–1848)
	Philippe d'Orleans, son of Philippe de France, as Duke of Chartres, heir to the Dukedom of Orleans Azure, three fleurs-de-lys or, a label argent, with a crescent argent,
	Marie Louise d'Orléans (1662 † 1689), daughter of Philippe de France, married in 1679 to Charles II (1661 † 1700), King of Spain Per pale I, Quarterly 1 and 4, gules, a castle or masoned and ajouré azure; 2 and 3 argent, a lion gules armed, langued and crowned or, grafted in point a pomegranate proper seeded gules, supported, sculpted and slipped vert; II, azure, three fleurs-de-lys or, a label argent.
	Louise Élisabeth d'Orléans (1709 † 1742), daughter of Philippe d'Orléans, regent of the kingdom of France, married in 1722 to Louis I (1707 † 1724), King of Spain Two shields coupled: these being Spain – quarterly, I grand-quarterly 1 and 4 gules, a three-towered castle or, masoned sable and ajouré azure (for Castile); 2 and 3 argent, a lion rampant purpure crowned or, langued and armed gules (for Leon); grafted in point argent a pomegranate proper seeded gules, supported, sculpted and slipped vert (for Granada); II per pale or, four pallets gules (for Aragon), and per saltire or, four pallets gules and argent an eagle displayed sable (for Sicily); III per fess gules, a fess argent (for Austria); bendy of six or and azure, a bordure gules (for Burgundy); IV per fess, azure, semé-de-lys or, a bordure compony of argent and gules (for Valois-Burgundy); sable a lion rampant or langued and armed gules (for Brabant). Grafted in point, per pale or, a lion rampant sable armed and langued gules (for Flanders); argent an eagle displayed gules, armed, beaked, and langued or (for Tyrol). Overall an inescutcheon azure, three fleurs-de-lys or, a bordure gules (for Anjou) and Bourbon-Orleans –azure, three fleurs-de-lys or, a label argent.
	Louis Philippe d'Orléans, Duke of Orléans, then King of the French. Louis Philippe initially kept the arms of Orleans surmounted by a royal crown. But during a riot in 1830 in Paris, his exhibited arms were vandalized. Louis Philippe then adopted a new emblem: Azure tables of the Act Or, on which are inscribed: "Charte constitutionnelle 1830 (Constitutional Charter of 1830)". The fleur-de-lys disappeared, but the traditional colors of France (blue and gold) are retained.
	When the monarchy fell, the Orléans resumed the use of their old arms. In particular, at the death of Louis-Philippe, his grandson and immediate heir, the Count of Paris, used such arms until the death of the Count of Chambord in 1883. Philippe d'Orléans (1838–1894), Count of Paris Azure, three fleurs-de-lys or, a label argent, then azure, three fleurs-de-lys or (1883).
	Mercedes d'Orléans (1860 † 1878), daughter of Antoine d'Orléans, Duke of Montpensier, married in 1878 to Alfonso XII (1857 † 1885), King of Spain Per pale, I, quarterly 1 and 4, gules, a castle or masoned and ajouré azure; 2 and 3 argent, a lion purpure armed, langued and crowned or, grafted in point a pomegranate proper seeded gules, supported, sculpted and slipped vert; overall azure, three fleurs-de-lys or, a bordure gules; II, azure, three fleurs-de-lys or, a label argent.
	Orleanist pretenders to the French throne since 1883: Philippe d'Orléans (1869–1896–1926), Duke of Orléans Jean d'Orléans (1874–1926–1940), Duke of Guise Henri d'Orléans (1908–1940–1999), Count of Paris Henri d'Orléans (1933–1999—2019), Count of Paris, Duke of France Jean d'Orléans (1965—2019—), Duke of Vendôme, Count of Paris, Duke of France Azure, three fleurs-de-lys or
	Jacques d'Orléans (1941), Duke of Orléans , son of Henri d'Orléans (1908–1999) Azure, three fleurs-de-lys or, a label argent.
	Anne d'Orléans, Duchess of Calabria, married to Charles of Bourbon-Two Sicilies, Duke of Calabria and pretender to the throne of Two-Sicilies, daughter of Henri d'Orléans (1908–1999), Count of Paris . As Duchess of Calabria (1965–2015): Two shields coupled: that of Bourbon-Sicily (Tierced in pale I, quarterly: 1 and 4, or, six fleurs-de-lys azure, in three, two and one, (for Farnèse); 2 and 3, per pale gules, a fess argent (for Austria) and bendy of six, or and azure, a bordure gules (for Burgundy); overall argent, five escutcheons in cross azure, each charged with five plates in saltire, a bordure gules charged with eight three-towered castles or, masoned and ajouré azure (for Portugal); II, tierced per fess, I per pale quarterly 1 and 4 gules, a three-towered castle or, masoned and ajouré azure (for Castile); 2 and 3 argent, a lion purpure (for Léon); per pale or, four pallets gules (for Aragon) and per saltire or, four pallets gules and argent, an eagle sable (for Sicily). Grafted in point argent a pomegranate proper seeded gules, supported, sculpted and slipped vert (for Granada); II per pale gules, a fess argent (for Austria) and azure, semé-de-lys or, a bordure compony of gules and argent (for Valois-Burgundy); III quarterly 1 per bend sinister bendy of six or and azure, a bordure gules (for Burgundy) and or, a lion sable, armed and langued gules (for Flanders); 2 per bend sable, a lion or, armed and langued gules (for Brabant) and argent, an eagle gules (for Tyrol); 3 azure, semé-de-lys d'or, a label gules (for Naples); 4 argent, a cross potent or cantonned by four crosslets or (for Jerusalem); III, or, six roundels one, two, two and one, that in chief azure, three fleurs-de-lys or, the rest gules (for Tuscany). Overall azure, three fleurs-de-lys or, two and one, a bordure gules (for Anjou)) and that of France (azure, three fleurs-de-lys or). As Dowager (2015–): Impaled: that of Bourbon-Sicily (Tierced in pale I, quarterly: 1 and 4, or, six fleurs-de-lys azure, in three, two and one, (for Farnèse); 2 and 3, per pale gules, a fess argent (for Austria) and bendy of six, or and azure, a bordure gules (for Burgundy); overall argent, five escutcheons in cross azure, each charged with five plates in saltire, a bordure gules charged with eight three-towered castles or, masoned and ajouré azure (for Portugal); II, tierced per fess, I per pale quarterly 1 and 4 gules, a three-towered castle or, masoned and ajouré azure (for Castile); 2 and 3 argent, a lion purpure (for Léon); per pale or, four pallets gules (for Aragon) and per saltire or, four pallets gules and argent, an eagle sable (for Sicily). Grafted in point argent a pomegranate proper seeded gules, supported, sculpted and slipped vert (for Granada); II per pale gules, a fess argent (for Austria) and azure, semé-de-lys or, a bordure compony of gules and argent (for Valois-Burgundy); III quarterly 1 per bend sinister bendy of six or and azure, a bordure gules (for Burgundy) and or, a lion sable, armed and langued gules (for Flanders); 2 per bend sable, a lion or, armed and langued gules (for Brabant) and argent, an eagle gules (for Tyrol); 3 azure, semé-de-lys d'or, a label gules (for Naples); 4 argent, a cross potent or cantonned by four crosslets or (for Jerusalem); III, or, six roundels one, two, two and one, that in chief azure, three fleurs-de-lys or, the rest gules (for Tuscany). Overall azure, three fleurs-de-lys or, two and one, a bordure gules (for Anjou)) with that of France (azure, three fleurs-de-lys or).
	Michel d'Orléans (1941), Count of Évreux , son of Henri d'Orléans (1908–1999), Count of Paris Azure, three fleurs-de-lis or, a bend compony of argent and gules.
	Charles-Philippe d'Orléans (1973), Duke of Anjou , Grandmaster of the Order of St. Lazarus, eldest son of Michel d'Orléans, Count of Evreux . Quarterly Order of Saint Lazarus and Anjou, the escutcheon placed on a cross of St. Lazarus of eight points. The arms of Charles Philip as grandmaster are the same as those of his competitor, his cousin the Duke of Seville. Azure, three fleurs-de-lys or, a bordure gules.

====== House of Orléans-Braganza ======
Figure	Name of Armiger and Blazon
	Pretenders to the Brazilian throne since 1921 (House of Orleans-Braganza, the Brazilian imperial family) Pedro Henrique (1909–1981), Prince of Brazil Luiz Gastão (1938), Prince of Brazil Since 1912: Vert, an armillary-sphere Or, pierced with a cross formy Gules, voided Argent, and surrounded by an annulet Azure charged with nineteen five-pointed stars Argent.
	Heir of the pretender to the throne of Brazil Pedro de Alcântara (1875–1940), Prince of Grão-Pará Luís Maria (1878–1920), Prince Imperial of Brazil Pedro Henrique (1909–1981), as Prince Imperial of Brazil (1920–1921) Luís Gastão (1911–1931), Prince Imperial of Brazil Pia Maria (1913–2000), Princess Imperial of Brazil Luiz Gastão (1938), as Prince Imperial of Brazil (1938–1981) Bertrand (1941), Prince Imperial of Brazil Since 1912: Vert, an armillary-sphere Or, pierced with a cross formy Gules, voided Argent, and surrounded by an annulet Azure charged with nineteen five-pointed stars Argent. On chief, a label argent.

==== House of Bourbon-Condé ====
Figure	Name of Armiger and Blazon
	Louis I (1530 † 1569), Prince of Condé, son of Charles IV, Duke of Bourbon and Vendôme Azure, three fleurs-de-lys or, on a bend gules a plate in chief, then used by: Henri I (1552 † 1588), prince of Condé, son of Louis I
	Henri II (1588 † 1646), son of Henri I, prince of Condé, Duke of Châteauroux, Duke of Montmorency, Duke of Albret, Duke of Enghien and Duke of Bellegarde, premier Prince du sang of France, Premier Peer of France, Grandmaster of France, Grand Veneur of France and Grand Louvetier of France, Knight of the Holy Spirit Azure, three fleurs-de-lys or, a bendlet couped gules, then used by the Princes of Condé
	Dukes of Enghien, eldest sons of the Princes of Condé Azure, three fleurs-de-lys or, a bendlet couped gules, a label argent
	François (1558 † 1614), prince of Conti, son of Louis I de Condé Quarterly 1 and 4, azure, three fleurs-de-lys, or a bend gules, 2 and 3 azure, three fleurs-de-lys or, a bordure gules charged with eight plates
	Charles (1566–1612), Count of Soissons, son of Louis, Prince of Conde. Azure, three fleurs-de-lys or, a bendlet couped gules, a bordure gules, then used by his son: Louis, Count of Soissons. At the extinction of the Soissons branch of the House of Conde, it was used by Armand (1626 † 1666), prince of Conti, son of Henri II de Condé, and then his descendants, the Princes of Conti
	Charles (1700–1760), Count of Charolais, son of Louis III, Prince of Conde. Azure, three fleurs-de-lys or, on a bendlet couped gules, a fleur-de-lys argent.

==== House of Bourbon-Carency ====
Figure	Name of Armiger and Blazon
	John (1378 † 1457), Lord of Carency, son of John I, Count of La Marche Azure, three fleurs-de-lys or, on a bend gules, three lioncels argent, a bordure gules.

==== House of Bourbon-Préaux ====
Figure	Name of Armiger and Blazon
	Jacques (1346 † 1417), Lord of Préaux, son of James I of La Marche Quarterly, 1 and 4 azure, semé-de-lys or, on a bend gules three lioncels argent; 2 and 3 gules, an eagle or.
	Peter of Carency (1390 † 1422), Lord of Préaux, son of James of Bourbon-Preaux Azure, semé-de-lys or, a bend gules, a bordure gules.

=== Illegitimate branches ===
==== House of Bourbon-Lavedan ====
Figure	Name of Armiger and Blazon
	Charles de Bourbon-Lavedan (1450 † 1502), bastard of Bourbon, knight, baron of Chaudes-Aigues and Malause, Lord of La Chauffée, Estain, Bouconville, counselor, chamberlain to the king, Seneschal of Toulouse and Bourbonnais, Argent, a bend azure semé-de-lys or, a cottice gules.
	Gaston de Bourbon, Lord of Bazian († 1555), son of preceding. Azure, three fleurs-de-lys or, debruised by a cottice gules, overall a cottice traversed argent.
	Henry of Bourbon († 1555), Viscount of Lavedan, Baron of Malause and Chaudes-Aigues, Lord of Miremont and Faybeton, and Favars. Azure, three fleurs-de-lys or, debruised by a bendlet couped gules, overall a cottice traversed or.

==== House of Bourbon-Busset ====
Figure	Name of Armiger and Blazon
	The House of Bourbon-Busset was the eldest (but illegitimate) line of the House of Bourbon since the sixteenth century. Louis de Bourbon (1438–1482), prince-bishop of Liège, had a natural son, Peter, bastard of Bourbon, baron of Busset (1464–1530), also called the Grand Bastard of Liège, from whom descend this branch of the Bourbons, barons of Busset and Châlus, Bourbon-Busset . For Father Anselm, the Bourbon-Busset bore Azure, semé-de-lys or, a cottice gules in bend, a chief argent, charged with a cross potent or, cantonned by four crosslets or.
	Generally the blazon attributed to the Bourbon-Busset is: Bourbon, in chief Jérusalem, which is azure, three fleurs-de-lys or (for France moderne) a bendlet couped gules (which is the brisure for Bourbon moderne), on chief argent a cross potent and counterpotent or (which is Jérusalem, brisure of Busset).
	At the death of the last Condé, the Bourbons of Busset became the only non-royal Bourbons, and assumed the plain arms: azure, three fleurs-de-lys or (for France moderne) a bendlet couped gules (which is the brisure for Bourbon moderne).

==== House of Bourbon-Roussillon ====
Figure	Name of Armiger and Blazon
	Louis de Bourbon-Roussillon (1450 † 1487), Count of Roussillon and Ligny, legitimized son of Charles I, Duke of Bourbon, and his descendants: Azure, three fleurs-de-lys or, a bend sinister raguly gules.

== House of Artois ==
Figure	Name of Armiger and Blazon
	Robert I (1216 † 1250), Count of Artois Azure, semé-de-lys or, a label gules, on each point three castles or. Then used by: Robert II (1250 † 1302), Count of Artois, son of preceding; Robert III (1287 † 1342), Count of Beaumont-le-Roger, grandson of preceding; John (1321 † 1387), Count of Eu, son of preceding; The Artois Counts of Eu, until their extinction in 1472
	Philip (1269 † 1298), Lord of Conches, who predeceased his father, Robert II of Artois Azure, semé-de-lys or, a label gules, on each point three plates.
	Charles (1269 † 1298), Count of Longueville, then of Pézenas, younger son of Robert III, Count of Beaumont-le-Roger Azure, semé-de-lys or, a label gules, on each point three castles or (Artois); inescutcheon Constantinople.

== House of Anjou-Sicily ==
Figure	Name of Armiger and Blazon
	Charles I d'Anjou (1226 † 1285) before 1277: azure, semé-de-lys or, a label gules. after 1277: Per pale, 1 azure, semé-de-lys or, a label gules; 2 argent, a cross potent or, then used by: Charles II d'Anjou (1254 † 1309), son of Charles I; Robert I the Wise (1277 † 1344), son of Charles II; Joan I of Naples (1326 † 1382), daughter of Charles of Calabria, granddaughter of Robert I
	Charles Martel (1271 † 1295), titular king of Hungary, son of Charles II Quarterly 1 and 4, azure, semé-de-lys or; 2 and 3 barry of eight, gules and argent.
	Clementia of Hungary (1293 † 1328), daughter of Charles Martel, married to Louis X the Quarrelsome, King of France (1289 † 1316) per pale azure, semé-de-lys or and barry of eight gules and argent.
	Charles I Robert (1288 † 1342), King of Hungary, son of Charles Martel per pale 1 barry of eight gules and argent; 2 azure, semé-de-lys or, a label gules.
	Louis I (1326 † 1382), King of Hungary and Poland, son of Charles I Robert quarterly 1 per pale barry of eight gules and argent and azure, semé-de-lys or, a label gules; 2 gules, an eagle argent, membered and crowned or; 3 gules, a patriarchal cross argent on a hill vert; 4 azure, three heads of leopards or.
	Andrew of Hungary (1327 † 1345), King of Naples, son of Charles I Robert, husband of Joan I of Naples Tierced in pale 1 barry of eight gules and argent; 2 argent, a cross potent or; 3 azure, semé-de-lys or, a label gules, then used by: Charles III (1345 † 1386), King of Naples and Hungary, son of Louis de Gravina; Ladislas I (1372 † 1414), King of Naples, son of Charles III; Joan II (1373 † 1435), Queen of Naples, daughter of Charles III
	Charles, Duke of Calabria (1298 † 1328), son and heir of Robert I of Naples Per pale 1 azure, semé-de-lys or, a label gules; 2 argent, a cross potent or, cantonned by four crosslets or a bordure argent.
	Philip I (1278 † 1332), prince of Tarente, son of Charles II before 1313: azure, semé-de-lys or, a label gules, a bend argent, then used by: Philip (1297 † 1330), son of the first marriage of Philip I; after 1313: per pale 1 azure, semé-de-lys or, a label gules, a bend argent; 2 gules, a cross or cantonned by four bezants, each charged with a cross and cantonned by four crosslets or, then used by: Robert of Taranto (1315 † 1364), son of the second marriage of Philip I; Philip II of Taranto (1329 † 1374), son of the second marriage of Philip I
	Raymond Berengar (1279 † 1307), Count of Andria, son of Charles II of Naples France, a label gules a canton ermine.
	John (1294 † 1336), Duke of Durazzo, son of Charles II azure, semé-de-lys or, a label gules, a bordure compony of gules and argent then used by: Charles (1323 † 1348), Duke of Durazzo, eldest son of John of Durazzo; Louis (1324 † 1362), Duke of Gravina, youngest son of John of Durazzo

== House of Dreux ==
Figure	Name of Armiger and Blazon
	Robert I (1123 † 1188), Count of Dreux, son of Louis VI, King of France Chequy or and azure, a bordure gules, then used by: the Counts of Dreux until 1355.
	Robert III (1185 † 1234), son of Robert II, Count of Dreux, before he became Count of Dreux in 1198 Chequy or and azure, a bordure gules, a label gules.

=== House of Dreux-Beu ===
Figure	Name of Armiger and Blazon
	Robert I de Dreux (1212–1264), Lord of Beu, son of Robert III, Count of Dreux Chequy or and azure, a bordure engrailed gules, then used by : the Lords of Beu.

=== House of Dreux-Brittany ===
Figure	Name of Armiger and Blazon
	Peter Mauclerc (1191 –1250), baillistre of Brittany (1213–1237) and Earl of Richmond (1219–1235). Chequy or and azure, a canton ermine and a bordure gules. The canton ermine was widely used by second sons to difference the paternal arms. The choice of ermine for Brittany may therefore have been fortuitous, with the canton becoming the whole coat under Duke John III. Also used by his successors: John I, Duke of Brittany; John II, Duke of Brittany; Arthur II, Duke of Brittany; John III, Duke of Brittany
	John (1266 –1334), Earl of Richmond (1306–1334), son of John II of Brittany. Chequy or and azure, a bordure gules charged with leopards or and a canton ermine.
	Peter (1269–1312), Viscount of Léon (1306–1334), son of John II, Duke of Brittany. before 1316: Chequy or and azure, a bordure gules charged with plates, a canton ermine. after 1316: ermine a bordure gules, chargée de besants d'argent.
	John III (1286 † 1341), Duke of Brittany Ermine, then used by: the Dukes of Brittany until 1514.
	Guy VII (1287 † 1331), Count of Penthièvre and Viscount of Limoges, son of Arthur II, Duke of Brittany Ermine a bordure gules.
	Joan of Penthièvre (1319 † 1384), Countess of Penthièvre and Viscountess of Limoges, daughter of Guy VII, Count of Penthièvre Per pale ermine plain and ermine, a bordure gules.
	John (1294 † 1345), Count of Montfort, son of Arthur II, Duke of Brittany Ermine, a bordure gules charged with léopards or.
	Arthur III of Brittany (1393 † 1458), Earl of Richmond, before he became, in 1457, Duke of Brittany Ermine, a label of three points gules, each point charged with three léopards or.
	Peter II (1418 † 1457), Count of Guingamp, before he became, in 1450, Duke of Brittany Ermine, a label of three points azure, each point charged with three fleurs-de-lys or.
	Richard (1395 † 1438), Count of Étampes, Vertus, Benon and Mantes, son of John V, Duke of Brittany Ermine, a bordure engrailed gules.
	Francis II of Brittany (1435 † 1488), Count of Étampes, before he became, in 1450, Duke of Brittany Ermine, a label of three points azure, each point charged with a fleur-de-lys or; surchargé a label argent.
	Anne of Brittany (1477 † 1514), daughter of Francis II of Brittany and Margaret of Foix, Duchess of Brittany, then, in 1491 and 1499, Queen of France before 1491: Quarterly ermine and or, 3 pallets gules. after 1491: Per pale azure, three fleurs-de-lys or and ermine.

==== House of Dreux-Brittany-Machecoul ====
Figure	Name of Armiger and Blazon
	Oliver I of Machecoul (1231–1279), also called "Olivier de Braine", Lord of Machecoul, son of Peter Mauclerc. Argent, three chevrons gules.

==== Avaugour branch, Counts of Goëllo ====
Figure	Name of Armiger and Blazon
	Francis I of Avaugour, Count of Vertus and Goëllo, Baron of Avaugour (1462–1510), son of Francis II of Brittany. Quarterly I and IV ermine, II and III grand-quarterly: 1 and 4 azure, three fleurs-de-lys or, a label argent, 2 and 3 argent, a biscione azure crowned or devouring a child carnation; overall argent, a chief gules.

== House of Courtenay ==
Figure	Name of Armiger and Blazon
	Peter I (1126 † 1183), Lord of Courtenay, son of Louis VI the Fat, King of France Or, three torteaus, then used by: Peter II of Courtenay (1155 † 1219), son of Peter I; Philip II (1195–1226), margrave of Namur, son of Peter II; the heads of the Capetian House of Courtenay, extinct by 1730
	Peter II (1155 † 1219), Lord of Courtenay, Latin Emperor of Constantinople Gules, a cross or cantonned by four bezants, each bezant charged with a cross or and cantonned by four crosslets or, then used by: Robert I (1201 † 1228), son of Peter II; Baldwin II (1219 † 1273), son of Peter II; Philip (1243 † 1283), son of Baldwin II; Catherine (1274 † 1307), daughter of Philip
	Robert I (1168 † 1239), Lord of Champignelles-en-Puisaye, son of Peter I, Lord of Courtenay Or, three torteaus, a label of five points azure, then used by: the Lords of Champignelles, until 1324 (when they became the heads of the House of Courtenay)

== House of Vermandois ==
Figure	Name of Armiger and Blazon
	Ralph I (1085 † 1152), Count of Vermandois and Valois Chequy or and azure, then used by the Counts of Vermandois, his successors (extinct by 1167).

== House of Burgundy ==
Figure	Name of Armiger and Blazon
	Odo II (1118 † 1162), Duke of Burgundy bendy of six, or and azure, a bordure gules, then used by the Dukes of Burgundy until 1361
	Odo of Burgundy (1230 † 1269), Count of Nevers, Auxerre and Tonnerre bendy of six, or and azure, a bordure indented gules, then used by: his nephew Odo IV (1295 † 1350), second son of Robert II, before the death of his elder brother
	Philip of Burgundy (1323 † 1346), son of Odo IV bendy of six, or and azure, a bordure gules, a fleur-de-lys or at the canton.
	Louis of Burgundy (1297 † 1316), prince of Morée, third son of Robert II bendy of six, or and azure, a bordure gules, a canton gules, a cross pommety or.
	Joan of Burgundy (1293 † 1349), daughter of Robert II, married in 1313 to Philip VI of France, King of France (1293 † 1350) Per pale, 1 France, which is azure, three fleurs-de-lys or; 2 Duchy of Burgundy, which is bendy of six or and azure, a bordure gules.
	Alexandre de Bourgogne (1170 † 1205), Lord of Montagu, son of Hugh III bendy of six, or and azure, a bordure gules, a canton ermine, then used by the Lords of Montagu, his descendants
	Guigues VI (1184 † 1237), Dauphin of Viennois, son of Hugh III or, a dolphin azure, crested, barbed, finned, with scales and gills gules, then used by the dauphins of Viennois, his descendants

=== House of Burgundy-Portugal ===
Figure	Name of Armiger and Blazon
	Afonso I (1109 † 1185), King of Portugal Argent, a cross azure. From 1180: Argent, five escutcheons azure platy then used by: Sancho I(1154 † 1211), King of Portugal; Afonso II (1185 † 1223), King of Portugal
	Sancho II (1207 † 1248), King of Portugal Argent, five escutcheons azure in cross, each charged with five plates
	Afonso III (1210 † 1279), King of Portugal Argent, five escutcheons azure in cross, each charged with five plates in saltire, a bordure gules charged with eleven three-towered castles or, masoned and ajouré azure then used by the kings of Portugal, who succeeded him, until John I of Portugal
	John I of Portugal, then used by the kings of Portugal who succeeded him until John II of Portugal Argent, five escutcheons azure in cross, the two escutcheons on the sides couched, each escutcheon charged with five plates in saltire, a bordure gules charged with twelve three-towered castles or, masoned and ajouré azure and charged by four visible bits of a cross flory vert.
	Peter, Duke of Coimbra (1392–1449), son of John I of Portugal Argent, five escutcheons azure in cross, the two escutcheons on the sides couched, each escutcheon charged with five plates in saltire, a bordure gules charged with twelve three-towered castles or, masoned and ajouré azure and charged by four visible bits of a cross flory vert, debruised by a label of three points argent, each point charged with three ermine spots.
	John of Coimbra (1431–1457), Infante of Portugal and Prince of Antioch, son of preceding. Quarterly, I argent, a cross potent or, cantonned by four crosslets or (for Jerusalem); II quarterly 1 and 4 argent five escutcheons azure in cross, the two escutcheons on the sides couched, each escutcheon charged with five plates in saltire, a bordure gules charged with twelve three-towered castles or, masoned and ajouré azure and charged by four visible bits of a cross flory vert (for Portugal), 2 and 3 quarterly 1 and 4 azure, three fleurs-de-lys or (for France), 2 and 3 gules, three lion passants or, III or, a lion gules, armed, langued and crowned azure (for Armenia) and IV argent, a lion gules, armed, langued and crowned or (for Cyprus), overall barry of eight of argent and azur, a lion gules, armed, langued and crowned or (for Lusignan-Cyprus).
	James of Coimbra (1433–1469), Infante of Portugal, Bishop of Arras, Bishop of Paphos and Archbishop of Lisbon. Third son of Peter, Duke of Coimbra Quarterly, I and IV argent, five escutcheons azure in cross, the two on the sides couched, each charged with five plates in saltire, a bordure gules, charged with twelve three-towered castles or, masoned and ajouré azure, four fleurs-de-lys vert, debruised by a label argent, each point charged with three ermine spots (for Aviz-Coimbra), II and III or, four pallets gules (for Aragon).
	Henry, Duke of Viseu, also called the Navigator (1394–1460), son of John I of Portugal argent, five escutcheons azure in cross, the two on the sides couched, each charged with five plates in saltire, a bordure gules, charged with twelve three-towered castles or, masoned and ajouré azure, four fleurs-de-lys vert, debruised by a label azure, each point charged with three fleurs-de-lys or.
	John, Infante of Portugal (1400–1442), son of John I of Portugal argent, five escutcheons azure in cross, the two on the sides couched, each charged with five plates in saltire, a bordure gules, charged with twelve three-towered castles or, masoned and ajouré azure, four fleurs-de-lys vert, debruised by a label or, each point charged with a flank dexter gules.
	Ferdinand, prince of Portugal (1402–1443), Grandmaster of Aviz, son of John I of Portugal argent, five escutcheons azure in cross, the two on the sides couched, each charged with five plates in saltire, a bordure gules, charged with eight three-towered castles or, masoned and ajouré azure, two lions passant guardant or in chief, four fleurs-de-lys vert.
	Afonso V of Portugal (1432–1481), eldest son of Edward I of Portugal. During the War of the Castilian Succession, Afonso V proclaimed himself king of Léon and Castile (1475–1479) and quartered the arms of Portugal-Aviz and Castile-León. Quarterly 1 and 4, argent, five escutcheons azure in cross, the two on the sides couched, each charged with five plates in saltire, a bordure gules, charged with twelve three-towered castles or, four visible bits of a cross flory vert; 2 and 3 grand-quarterly 1 and 4, gules, a castle or masoned and ajouré azure; 2 and 3 argent a lion purpure armed, langued and crowned or.
	Ferdinand (1433–1470), Duke of Viseu, son of Edward I of Portugal argent, five escutcheons azure in cross, the two on the sides couched, each charged with five plates in saltire, a bordure gules, charged with twelve three-towered castles or, masoned and ajouré azure, four fleurs-de-lys vert, debruised by a label of two points argent, each point per saltire, or, four pallets gules and argent, an eagle sable.
	John II of Portugal Argent, five escutcheons azure platy in cross, a bordure gules charged with seven three-towered castles or, masoned and ajouré azure Then used by his successors as monarchs: Manuel I; John III; Sebastian I; From the House of Braganza, directly descended agnatically in the male line from the House of Aviz: John IV; Afonso VI; Pedro II; John V; Joseph I; Maria I; John VI; Pedro IV (also Emperor of Brazil-see below); Maria II; Also used by the following pretenders to the throne of Portugal: Miguel I; Miguel, Duke of Braganza; Duarte Nuno; Duarte Pio
	Arms of the Heir Apparent to the throne of Portugal. Used by: Afonso VI as heir apparent; John V as heir apparent; Joseph I as heir apparent; José, Prince of Brazil as heir apparent; John VI as heir apparent; Pedro IV as heir apparent; Also used by the following eldest sons of the Miguelist pretenders to the throne of Portugal: Miguel, Duke of Braganza; Duarte Nuno, Duke of Braganza; Duarte Pio, Duke of Braganza; Afonso, Prince of Beira
	Infante Dinis, Duke of Porto, second son of Duarte Pio, Duke of Braganza The Royal arms of Portugal differenced by a label of three points argent, the third charged with Gules, a Tower Argent
	Infante Henrique, Duke of Coimbra, second son of Duarte Nuno, Duke of Braganza The Royal arms of Portugal differenced by a label of three points argent, the second charged with the arms of Orléans and the third with the Imperial Arms of Brazil (alluding to the prince's mother, née Princess of Orléans e Bragança)
	Infante Miguel, Duke of Viseu, third son of Duarte Nuno, Duke of Braganza The Royal arms of Portugal differenced by a label of three points argent, the third charged with the Imperial Arms of Brazil (alluding to the prince's mother, née Princess of Orléans e Bragança)
	Pedro I of Brazil Later used by: Emperor Pedro II of Brazil; Isabella of Brazil
