= Catherine of Alençon =

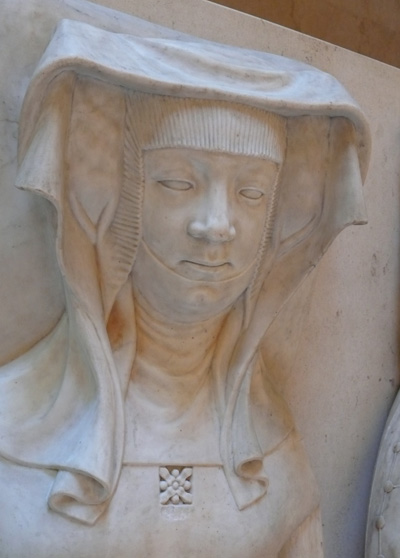

Duchess of Bavaria
- Born: before 1396
- Died: 22 June 1462; Paris
- Noble family: Valois-Alençon
- Spouses: Peter of Évreux; Louis VII, Duke of Bavaria
- Issue: John of Bavaria unnamed daughter
- Father: Peter II of Alençon
- Mother: Marie Chamaillart, Viscountess of Beaumont-au-Maine

Catherine d'Alençon (bef.1396 – 22 June 1462 in Paris) was the Duchess consort of Bavaria as the second spouse of Louis VII, Duke of Bavaria. She was a younger daughter of Peter II of Alençon and his wife Marie Chamaillart, Viscountess of Beaumont-au-Maine. Catherine was also maid of honour to Louis' sister, Isabeau of Bavaria.

== Life ==
Catherine came from a branch of the French royal family, the House of Valois; her family was known as The House of Valois-Alençon. Her brother John I, Duke of Alençon was killed at the Battle of Agincourt against Henry V of England. Catherine married Peter of Évreux, Count of Mortain, brother of Charles III of Navarre. After only one year of marriage, Peter died; the marriage produced no children.

One year after Peter's death, Catherine was betrothed again to Louis VII, Duke of Bavaria, brother of Isabeau, Queen of France. The wedding, however, had to be postponed, as Catherine's future husband was taken prisoner. The wedding took place on Louis' release in early October 1413. Catherine's Dowry covered not only the county of Mortain, 60,000 francs but it also created connections between Bavaria and France.

Louis travelled in early 1415 as head of the French embassy to the Council of Constance. Catherine's husband gave the County of Mortain from Catherine's dowry to John the Fearless, Duke of Burgundy, to free his wife. During the Armagnac-Burgundian Civil War in 1417, she had been taken prisoner by Bernard VII of Armagnac and did not care for their financial supply.

Catherine lost all of their income by Henry V's successful invasion. Henry took the county of Mortain and occupied their heritages in Normandy. Even precious utensils, documents and account books were taken by the English. Help finally came not from her husband, but from the English king, who made an agreement with the French King, the Treaty of Troyes, which gave Catherine 2000 francs per year as compensation for her losses. In 1421 Catherine even travelled to England, as lady-in-waiting to the wife of the King Henry, Catherine of Valois, who was Catherine's niece. Catherine even assisted in the birth of their child, Henry VI of England.

Catherine's second husband, Louis VII, Duke of Bavaria, died on 1 May 1447 at Burghausen.

Catherine joined the household of her sister-in-law, Isabeau. Catherine died 1462 in Paris and was buried in the Abbey of Sainte-Geneviève. She is now buried next to her first husband, Peter.

== Children ==
Louis and Catherine had two children:

- John of Bavaria (b. 6 February 1415), died young
- unnamed daughter, died young

Catherine left no surviving children.

== Ancestry ==
Ancestors of Catherine of Alençon

Charles, Count of Valois
Charles II, Count of Alençon
Margaret, Countess of Anjou
Peter II, Count of Alençon
Fernando de la Cerda
María de la Cerda
Juana Núñez de Lara
Catherine of Alençon
Guillaume I Chamaillard, Lord of Anthenaise
Guillaume II Chamaillard, Lord of Anthenaise
Eramburge
Marie Chamaillard, Viscountess of Beaumont
Jean II de Brienne, Viscount of Beaumont
Marie de Brienne, Viscountess of Beaumont-au-Maine
Isabeau d'Harcourt

== Literature ==
- Claudia Märtl: Frankreich. Herzog Ludwig VII. von Bayern-Ingolstadt (1368–1447) und seine Schwester Isabeau am französischen Königshof. In: Alois Schmid, Katharina Weigand (eds.): Bayern mitten in Europa. Vom Frühmittelalter bis ins 20. Jahrhundert. C. H. Beck, Munich 2005, ISBN 3-406-52898-8, P. 107-120, especially p. 116-117.
- Beatrix Schönewald: Die Herzoginnen von Bayern-Ingolstadt. In: Sammelblatt des Historischen Vereins Ingolstadt. Volume 113, 2004, p. 35-54, especially p. 48-52.
- Theodor Straub: Bayern im Zeichen der Teilungen und Teilherzogtümer. In: Max Spindler, Andreas Kraus (eds.): Handbuch der bayerischen Geschichte. 2nd edition. Vol. 2, C. H. Beck, Munich 1988, ISBN 3-406-32320-0, p. 196-287, especially p. 245.
- Theodor Straub: Die fünf Ingolstädter Herzoginnen. In: Bayern-Ingolstadt, Bayern-Landshut. 1392–1506. Glanz und Elend einer Teilung. Stadtarchiv Ingolstadt 1992, ISBN 3-932113-06-3, P. 43-50, especially p. 47-49.

Preceded by Elisabeth of Cleves	Duchess of Bavaria-Ingolstadt; 1 October 1413 – 1 May 1447	Succeeded by Elisabeth, Duchess of Luxembourg
