= Charles of Alençon =

Charles of Alençon may refer to:

- Charles I, Count of Alençon (died 1325)
- Charles II, Count of Alençon (died 1346)
- Charles III, Count of Alençon (died 1361)
- Charles IV, Duke of Alençon (r. 1492–1525)
- Charles, Duke of Berry (1686–1714), also Duke of Alençon
