= Noël Alexandre =

French theologian (1639–1724)

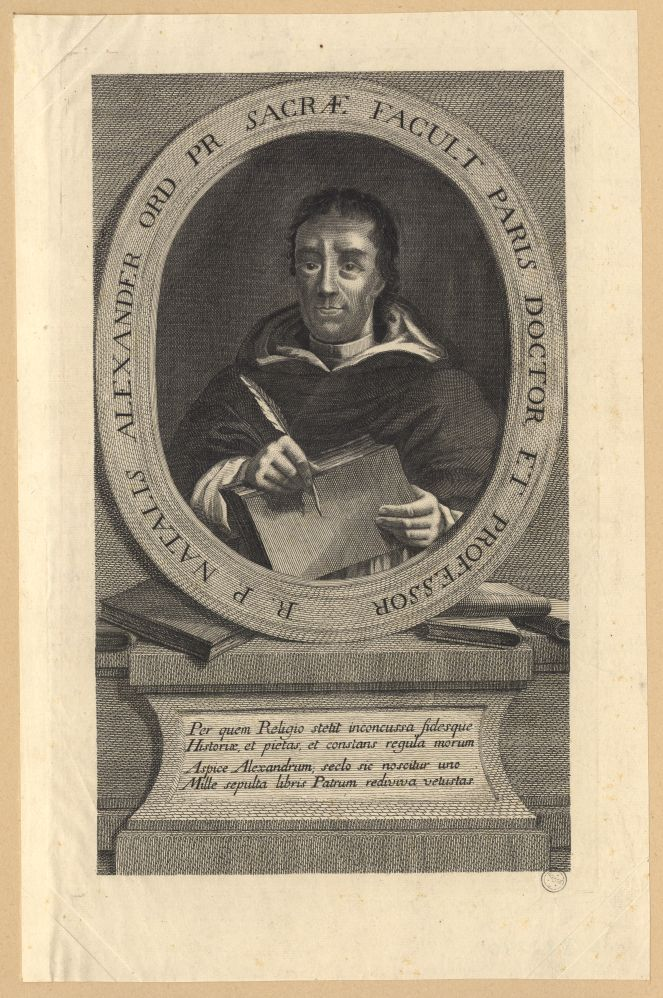
Noël Alexandre

Noël Alexandre, or Natalis Alexander in Latin (19 January 1639 – 21 August 1724) was a French theologian, author, and ecclesiastical historian.

== Biography ==
Alexandre was born in Rouen, France. In 1654, he joined the Dominicans in his hometown. Shortly after his ordination, he was appointed professor (first regent) of philosophy at the Couvent des Jacobins in Paris, where he was later buried.

The success of Alexandre's subsequent lectures at the Sorbonne led to his selection by Jean-Baptiste Colbert as tutor to his son, Jacques Nicolas Colbert, afterwards archbishop of Rouen. Alexandre obtained the degree of doctor in divinity from the Sorbonne in 1675, and for twelve years taught philosophy, theology and ecclesiastical law to the members of the Saint-Jacques community.

In 1700, he published a work entitled Conformité des cérémonies chinoises avec l'idolâtrie grecque et romaine, as well as a series of seven Lettres sur les cérémonies de la Chine, in which he defended the Dominicans in the so-called "Querelle des rites", a dispute between Dominican missionaries and Jesuits over Confucianism.

He played a prominent part in ecclesiastical affairs and preached several times before Louis XIV, who granted him an annual pension of 800 livres. He became provincial of his order in 1706, but was banished to Châtellerault in 1709 for having subscribed to the Jansenist Cas de conscience (1703), and was deprived of his pension in 1713 on account of his opposition to the bull Unigenitus. He died in Paris on 21 August 1724, aged 85, having lost his sight some time before owing to his strenuous literary activity. He was buried in the now-demolished church of the Couvent des Jacobins in Paris. His numerous works are still much valued by ecclesiastical students.

== Bibliography ==
- Selecta historiae ecclesiasticae capita, et in loca ejusdem insignia dissertationes historicae, chronologicae, dogmaticae (26 volumes, Paris, 1676–1686). This is Alexandre's best-known work. It was placed on the Index by Pope Innocent XI, on account of his bold defence of the Gallican claims.
- Selecta historiae Veteris Testamenti capita, &c., (6 volumes, Paris 1689), is a history of the Old Testament. Of the numerous editions of Alexandre's ecclesiastical history the best is that of J. D. Mansi, which contains many valuable notes and additions (Lucca, 1749) and has been frequently reprinted.
- Theologia dogmatica et moralis secundum ordinem catechismi concilii Tridentini (10 volumes, Paris, 1694), This is Alexandre's principal contribution to theological literature, in which he clearly shows himself a disciple of the Thomist school.
- Conformités des cérémonies chinoises avec l'idolatrie grecque et romaine and Sept lettres sur les cérémonies de la Chine (both published at Cologne in 1700) are interesting as they mark him out as a pioneer in the study of comparative religion.
- Historia ecclesiastica veteris novique testamenti : ab orbe condito ad annum post Christum natum millesimum sexcentesimum Venturinus, 1734
