= María de la Cerda =

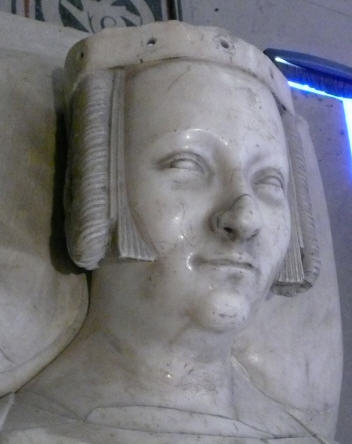

Countess of Étampes
- Reign: 1335–1336

Countess of Alençon
- Tenure: 1336-1346
- Born: 1319
- Died: 13 March 1375 (aged 55–56); Paris
- Spouse: Charles d'Évreux (m. 1335; died 1336) Charles II, Count of Alençon (m. 1336; died 1346)
- Issue among others...: Louis II d'Évreux; Charles III of Alençon; Peter II of Alençon; Robert of Alençon
- House: House of la Cerda
- Father: Fernando de la Cerda
- Mother: Juana Núñez de Lara

María de la Cerda y de Lara (1319 – 13 March 1375) was the youngest daughter of Fernando de la Cerda and Juana Núñez de Lara. She was a member of the Castilian House of Burgundy. By her second marriage, she was Countess of Alençon.

== Life ==
Maria was a younger sister of Juan Núñez III de Lara and Blanca de la Cerda y Lara. When she was only three years of age her father died, her mother died twenty-nine years later in 1351.

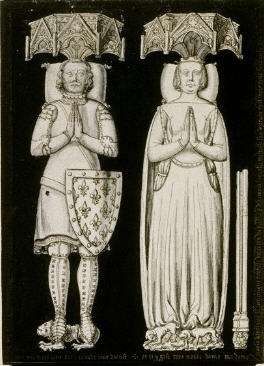
Maria and her second husband Charles

In April 1335 at Poissy, Maria married her first husband Charles d'Évreux. They were married for only a year but had twin sons. On the 5 September 1336 Charles died leaving Maria a seventeen-year-old widow with her two young sons.

Maria remarried only three months after Charles' death to Charles II, Count of Alençon. It was a second marriage for them both, Charles' first wife Jeanne of Joigny had died the previous year. They were married for nine years when Charles died at the Battle of Crécy.

Maria died in Paris on 13 March 1375 and was buried beside her second husband in the now-demolished church of the Couvent des Jacobins in Paris - their effigies are now in the Basilica of St Denis.

== Children ==
With Charles d'Évreux she had twin sons:

1. Louis II d'Évreux (1336–1400), married Jeanne (d. 1389), daughter of Raoul I of Brienne, Count of Eu
2. Jean (John) (1336 – aft. 1373, Rome)

With Charles II of Alençon she had the following children:

1. Charles III of Alençon (1337 – 5 July 1375, Lyon)
2. Philippe of Alençon (1338–1397, Rome), made Bishop of Beauvais in 1356, later Cardinal, Archbishop of Rouen, Latin Patriarch of Jerusalem, Patriarch of Aquileia, and Bishop of Ostia and Sabina
3. Peter II of Alençon (1340 – 20 September 1404)
4. Isabelle (1342 – 3 September 1379, Poissy), became a nun
5. Robert of Alençon (1344–1377), Count of Perche, married 5 April 1374 Jeanne, daughter of Viscount John I of Rohan

== Sources ==
- Doubleday, Simon R. (2001). The Lara Family: Crown and Nobility in Medieval Spain. Harvard University Press.
