= Rue Cujas =

Street in Paris, France

Coordinates: 48.8475°N 2.3432°E

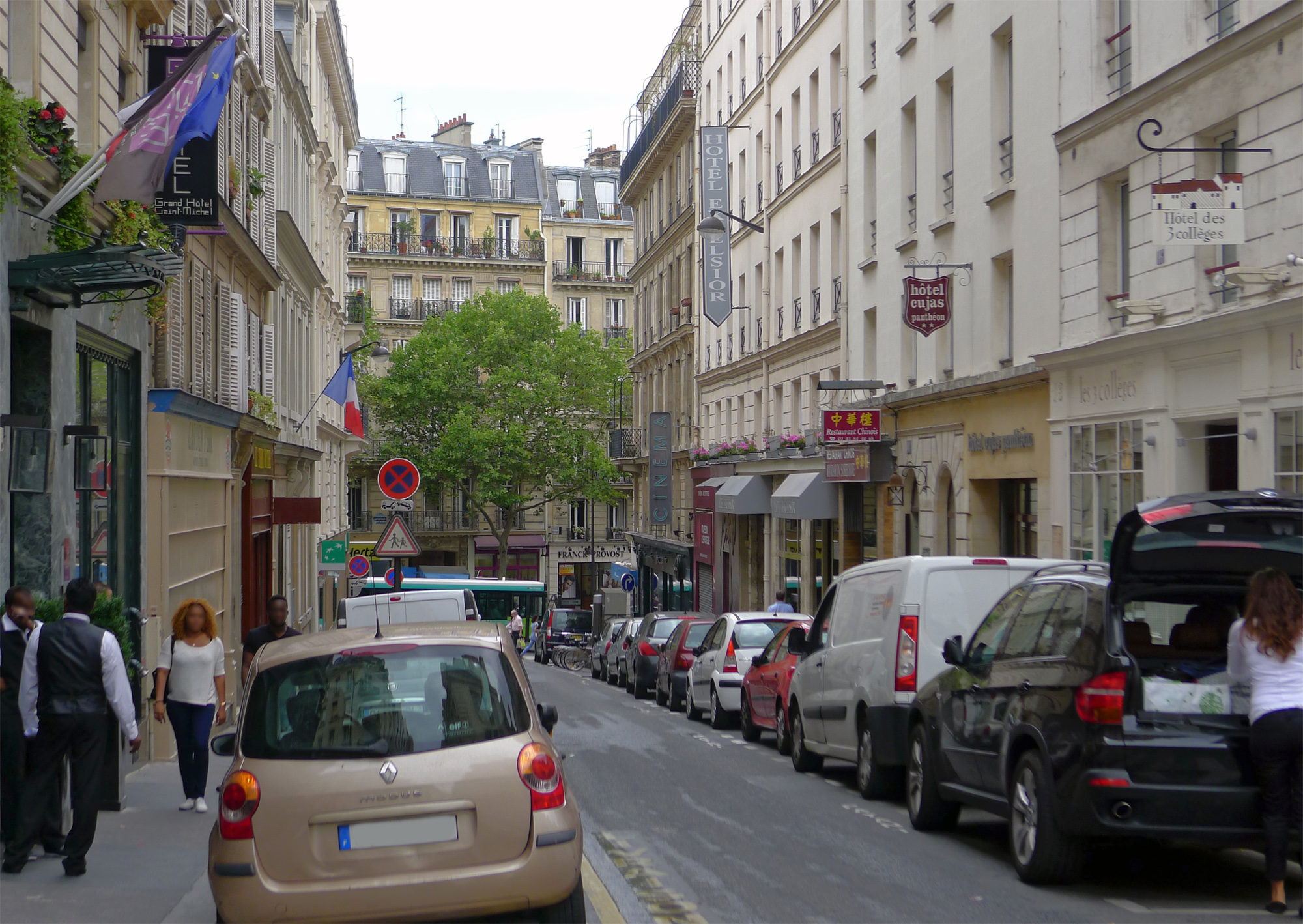
Rue Cujas, looking toward the Boulevard Saint-Michel

The Rue Cujas is a street in the 5th arrondissement of Paris, named after the legal expert Jacques Cujas (1522-1590), since it neighbours the Faculté de droit.
