= Charles III of Alençon =

French archbishop and noble (1337–1375)

Charles III of Alençon (1337 – 5 July 1375) was a French nobleman of the Capetian House of Valois. He was count of Alençon and Perche from 1346 until 1361, when he became a Dominican friar, and archbishop of Lyon from 1365 until his death.

== Countship ==
Charles III, a prince of the blood of France, was born in 1337. A scion of the Capetian House of Valois, he was the eldest of the five children of Count Charles II of Alençon and María de la Cerda. His father was the brother of King Philip VI. Countess María, originally a Spanish princess, raised her children in great piety. Charles II was killed on 26 August 1346 in the Battle of Crécy during France's Hundred Years' War against the English. The younger Charles, then aged only nine, succeeded his fallen father as the count of Alençon and Perche. Because of his youth, it was María who, as regent, ruled the counties of Alençon and Perche.

Charles's domain was invaded multiple times by the English, causing serious damage. The armed bands of King Charles II of Navarre, who ruled the neighbouring County of Évreux, also pillaged the young count's lands. Perche was invaded after the Battle of Poitiers in 1356. Charles's cousin King John II of France was captured in the battle; in order to secure the king's release, Charles's younger brother Peter was sent to England as a hostage.

== Ecclesiastical career ==
In 1361, Charles renounced his counties and became a Dominican friar, choosing Couvent des Jacobins de la rue Saint-Jacques in Paris. Philip, the eldest of Charles's younger brothers, had become bishop of Beauvais in 1356, and so their mother obtained a permission from King John II to divide the counties between the remaining brothers, Peter and Robert. Peter received Alençon, while Perche was assigned to Robert.

On 13 July 1365, Charles was made archbishop of Lyon at the insistence of his kinsman King Charles V. The cathedral chapter was so determined to safeguard its right to elect the archbishop independently of the king or the pope that it took them three rounds of voting to agree on Charles. By 1366, Charles was patronizing a circle of scholars, including Nicholas de Mesereyo.

Charles was among the more combative prelates, as were other archbishops of Lyon who originated from ruling families. He did not hesitate to use his influence at the royal court to maintain his rights, even if it involved the use of violence. Though all other archbishops of Lyon produced exclusively anonymous currency, Charles had coins minted with his name (or rather the initial K) on them. He did so by brazenly counterfeiting the money of his namesake the king.

As archbishop, Charles firmly resisted royal encroachment on his rights as primate of the Gauls. When the royal official, Archimbaud de Combort, tried to deprive him of his temporal power in 1372, Charles responded furiously with an interdict. The interdict remained in place until Charles's death on 5 July 1375. He was succeeded by Jean de Talaru.

== Sources ==
- Courtenay, William J. (2011). "Theological Bachelors at Paris on the Eve of the Papal Schism. The Academic Environment of Peter of Candia". In Speer, Andreas; Emery, Kent; Friedman, Russell (eds.). Philosophy and Theology in the Long Middle Ages: A Tribute to Stephen F. Brown. Brill.
- Dompnier, Bernard (2006). "Un point d'histoire lyonnaise dans un Consulto de Sarpi". In Marie Viallon-Schoneveld (ed.). Autour du Concile de Trente: actes de la table ronde de Lyon, 28 février 2003 (in French). Université de Saint-Etienne. ISBN 2862723940.
- Doubleday, Simon R. (2001). The Lara Family: Crown and Nobility in Medieval Spain. Harvard University Press.
- Fédou, René; Hours, Henri (1983). Le Diocèse de Lyon (in French). Editions Beauchesne. ISBN 2701010667.
- Siguret, Philippe (2000). Histoire du Perche (in French). Fédération des amis du Perche. ISBN 2900122279.
- Tricou, Jean (1957). Lyon conté par les médailles (in French). Crédit Lyonnais.

French nobility
Preceded by Charles II	Count of Alençon; 1346–1361	Succeeded by Peter II
Preceded by Charles II	Count of Perche; 1346–1361	Succeeded by Robert
Catholic Church titles
Preceded by Guillaume de Thurey	Archbishop of Lyon; 1365–1375	Succeeded by Jean de Talaru
