= Philip of Alençon =

French cardinal

Philip of Alençon (French: Philippe; 1339–16 November 1397) was a French cardinal who was a member of the Valois dynasty. He was the second son of Count Charles II of Alençon (grandson of King Philip the Bold and younger brother of King Philip VI of France), who was killed in the Battle of Crécy, and of Maria de La Cerda y de Lara (great-granddaughter of King Alfonso X of Castile). He was the younger brother of Count (later Archbishop) Charles III of Alençon.

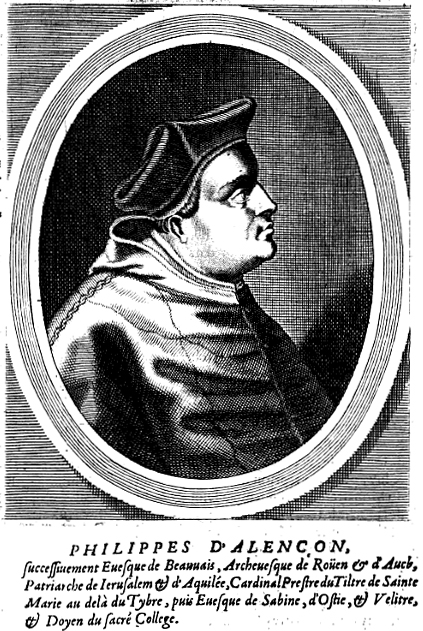
Cardinal Philippe of Alençon

== Biography ==
Born in the region of French Brie (French: Brie française), now the Department of Seine-et-Marne, Philippe entered Church service at an early age. He might have been the Archdeacon of Brie in his native Diocese of Meaux as a teenager. Philippe was named bishop of the Diocese of Beauvais, where he arrived on 24 March 1356 (aged 17) to take possession of the see, though he had not yet been consecrated, the details of which have been lost. After several years had passed without the confirmation of his appointment by the cathedral chapter, on 14 June 1360 he left to become the Archbishop of Rouen. Several years later, he entered into a dispute with King Charles V of France due to his refusal to grant a benefice to a priest whom the king had recommended.

At that point Philippe moved to Rome, where Pope Gregory XI named him the Latin Patriarch of Jerusalem. In 1374 he resigned the see of Rouen, and on 27 September of that same year was appointed as Apostolic Administrator of the Diocese of Auch, in which post he served until 1379.

Pope Urban VI (elected 8 April 1378) promoted Philippe to the rank of Cardinal Priest in the consistory of 18 September 1378, with the Basilica of Santa Maria in Trastevere as his titular church. The pope also appointed him Vicar General of the Papal States. Two days later, Philippe joined his fellow French cardinals in rejecting the authority of Urban and elected as pope the Antipope Clement VII—who allegedly had just authorized the massacre of 4,000 civilians in Cesena—who soon established his seat at Avignon in France. This was the beginning of the Western Schism, which was to last until 1415. For this betrayal, Pope Urban stripped him of all his offices.

Phillipe switched his allegiance in 1380 and was restored to his position, at which time he was promoted to the title of Cardinal Bishop of Sabina. The following year he was appointed the Patriarch of Aquileia, a prince-bishopric which was one of the most powerful ecclesiastical positions on the Italian peninsula. This appointment caused such serious discord among the local populace that, by 1388, the pope was forced to remove him. Serving as papal legate in Germany during 1389, he was unable to participate in the conclave that year which elected Urban's successor, Pope Boniface IX, who transferred him to the title of Cardinal Bishop of Ostia in 1392.

Philippe became the Dean of the College of Cardinals in February 1394. He died in Rome in 1397 with a reputation for deep piety and was buried in the tomb he had built for himself in Santa Maria in Trastevere.
