= Couvent des Jacobins de la rue Saint-Jacques =

Dominican monastery in Paris, France

Coordinates: 48.8472°N 2.3432°E

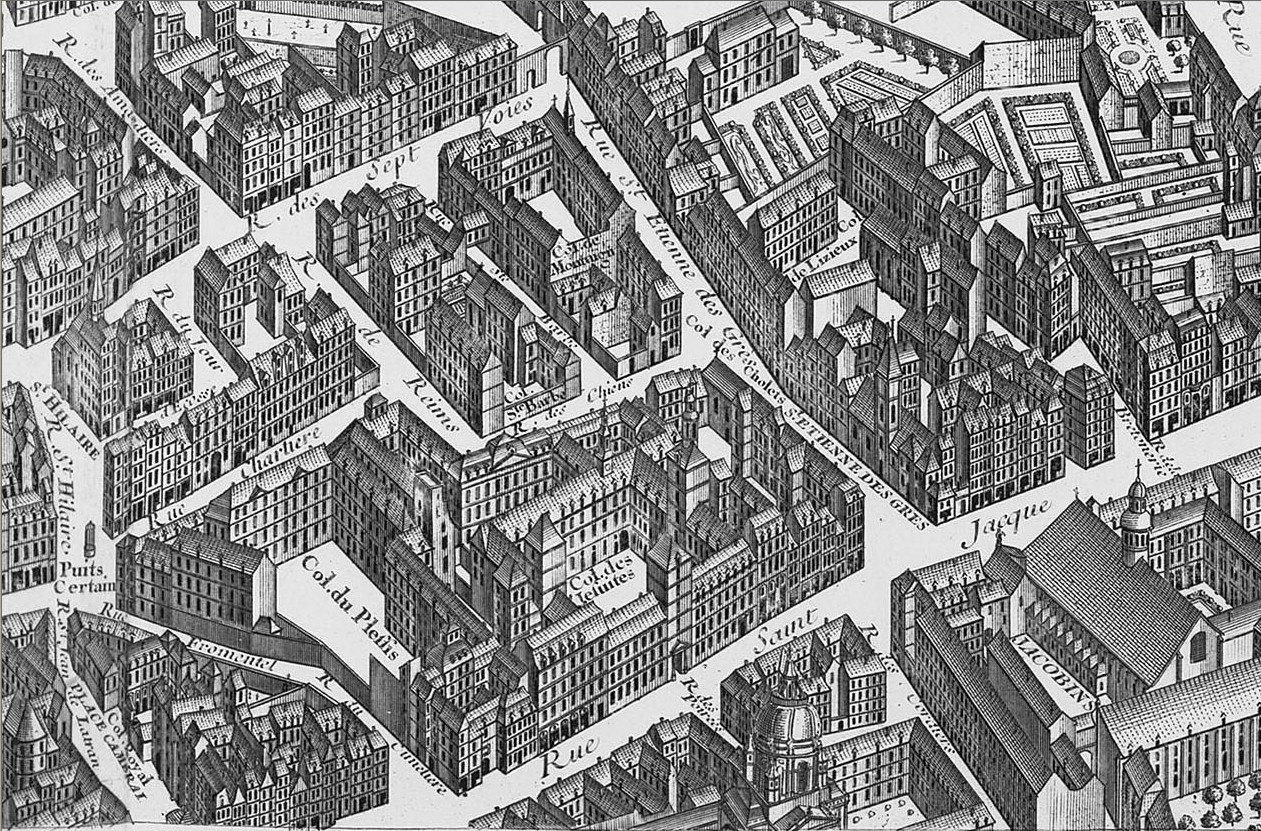
Detail of the plan de Turgot showing the monastery church on rue Saint-Jacques, opposite the exit from rue Saint-Étienne-des-Grès (now rue Cujas). In the foreground is the dome of the Sorbonne.

The Couvent Saint-Jacques, (Note: The Dominicans of the Couvent Saint-Jacques were reestablished in 1849 by father Lacordaire at a new address - they are now based at 20 rue des Tanneries, in the 13th arrondissement of Paris.) Grand couvent des Jacobins or Couvent des Jacobins de la rue Saint-Jacques (Note: It was the first of two Dominican monasteries in Paris - the second, of the reformed Dominicans, was the Couvent des Jacobins de la rue Saint-Honoré.) was a Dominican monastery on rue Saint-Jacques in Paris, France. Its complex was between what are now rue Soufflot and rue Cujas. Its teaching activities were the origin of the collège des Jacobins, a college of the historic University of Paris.

== History ==
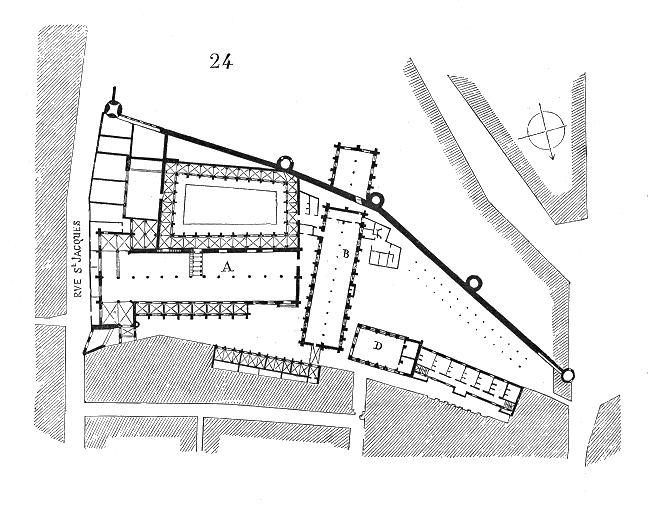
Plan of the couvent des Jacobins de la rue Saint-Jacques, by Eugène Viollet-le-Duc. Key - A: church; B: refectory (with the 'parloir aux bourgeois' on the other side of the enclosure); D: école Saint-Thomas.

The Dominican order established a base in Paris in 1217 in a house near Notre-Dame. In 1218 Jean Barastre (also known as Jean de Saint-Quentin, theology professor and doctor to Philip II of France) gave the order a house with a chapel near the city walls. This chapel was the chapel of a pilgrims' hospice - dedicated to Saint James the Great, it gave its name to rue Saint-Jacques and to the French Dominicans, who became known as the 'Jacobins' after their main monastery.

Major benefactions from Louis IX of France allowed the order to complete its church and build a dormitory and schools. In 1245, the Talmud was translated into Latin by the Jacobins. Although limited by the city wall and in competition with the other great monastery-college in Paris, the Cordeliers, the Dominicans expanded up to the wall of Philip II Augustus thanks to Louis XII of France.

A wealthy merchant named Hennequin gave the order a gift in 1556 which enabled it to rebuild its cloister. Its study room, known as the Écoles Saint-Thomas, was also rebuilt in 1563. A few years before the French Revolution this room was used for services, since the church was closed and in disrepair. The monastery was suppressed in 1790 and its buildings demolished between 1800 and 1849.

== Burials ==
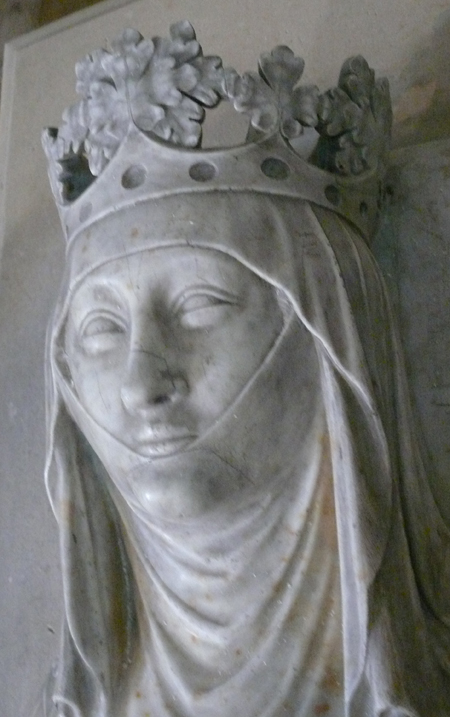
Clementia of Hungary, from her effigy, originally in the monastery church.

The monastery church housed many notable tombs.

=== Royal and princely tombs ===
- Charles, Count of Valois, son of Philip III of France, founder of the house of Valois (Note: The effigy is now in the Basilica of St Denis.)
- Charles II, Count of Alençon, son of the former
- Maria de La Cerda y Lara, second wife of the former
- Agnes, seventh daughter of John II of France
- Louis, Count of Évreux, son of Philip III of France
- Margaret of Artois, wife of the former
- Robert, Count of Clermont, son of Louis IX of France, founder of the house of Bourbon
- Louis I, Duke of Bourbon, son of the former
- Margaret of Clermont, sister of the former, wife of margrave John I, Marquis of Namur
- Peter I, Duke of Bourbon, son of Louis I
- Louis, younger son of Louis II, Duke of Bourbon
- Beatrice of Bourbon, daughter of Louis I, wife of Jean de Luxembourg then of Eudes II de Grancey, (Note: Her effigy was an upright rather than a horizontal one and is now at Saint-Denis.)
- Anne de Bourbon, Countess of Montpensier
- Philip of Artois, elder son of Robert II, Count of Artois
- Blanche of Brittany, wife of the former
- Gaston I, Count of Foix
- Clementia of Hungary, second wife of Louis X of France
- the hearts of:
  - Philip III of France
  - Peter I, Count of Alençon, fifth son of Louis IX
  - Charles IV of France
  - Philip III of Navarre, son of Louis, Count of Évreux
  - Joan II of Navarre, daughter of Louis X of France (Note: Only the faces of their effigies now survive, housed in the Louvre Museum.)
  - Charles I of Sicily, brother of Louis IX
- the viscera of:
  - king Philip V of France
  - Philip VI of France

=== Other tombs ===
- Humbert II of Viennois, last Dauphin de Viennois
- Gui de Malsec, cardinal
- Nicolas Coeffeteau and Noël Alexandre, Dominicans
- Peter Paludanus, Latin Patriarch of Jerusalem
- Agnès d'Orchies, Jeanne La Bricharde and Jeanne Roumaine, all three generals perpetual of the Béguines of Paris
- Jean Passerai, professor
- George Critton, a Scottish doctor in civil and canon law and royal professor
- Nicolas de Paris, substitute for the procureur-général du Parlement
- Claude Dormy, Bishop of Boulogne-sur-Mer
- Pierre de Rostrenen, chamberlain to Charles VII
- Jean de Meung, poet who continued the roman de la Rose
