= Charles II of Alençon =

Charles II
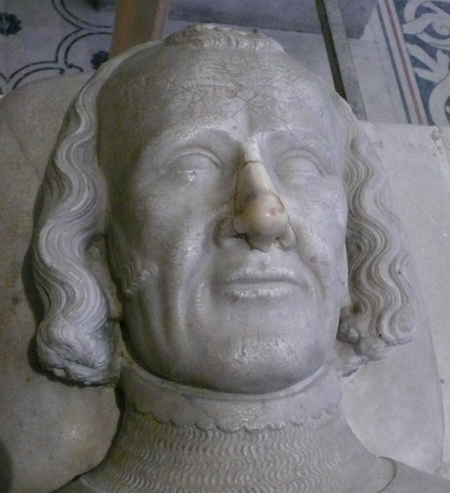

Count of Alençon and Perche
- Reign: 16 December 1325 – 26 August 1346
- Predecessor: Charles I
- Successor: Charles III
- Born: 1297; France
- Died: 26 August 1346 (aged 48–49); Battle of Crécy
- Burial: Couvent des Jacobins
- Spouse: Joan of Joigny; Maria de La Cerda y Lara
- Issue: Charles III, Count of Alençon; Philip of Alençon; Pierre II, Count of Alençon; Isabelle of Alençon; Robert of Alençon
- Father: Charles, Count of Valois
- Mother: Margaret, Countess of Anjou

Charles II, called the Magnanimous (1297 – 26 August 1346) was Count of Alençon and Count of Perche (1325–1346), as well as Count of Chartres and Count of Joigny (1335–1336) as husband of Joan of Joigny.

== Life ==
Charles was the second son of Charles of Valois and his first wife Margaret, Countess of Anjou, and brother of Philip VI of France. In April 1314 he married Joan of Joigny, who succeeded her father Jean II as Countess of Joigny in 1335, but she died on 2 September 1336. They had no children. Charles made his debut in Guyenne under the orders of his father and showed great courage at his first siege.

On the death of his father on 16 December 1325, Charles received the county of Alençon, the lands of Champrond, Châteauneuf-en-Thymerais and Senonches, as well as the forest of Perche, in accordance with an agreement made by his father.

His brother Philip became King of France in 1328, but Edward III of England claimed the crown and refused to do homage. Philip appointed Charles lieutenant general of the kingdom and sent him to put down a rebellion in Saintes, sparked by the English. He captured Saintes and several other strongholds.

== Engagement, marriages and issue ==
In April 1314, he was married firstly to Countess Joan of Joigny (d. 1336). They did not have children.

In December 1336, after the death of his first wife, he married secondly María de La Cerda y Lara (1310 – 19 November 1379, Paris), the daughter of Fernando de la Cerda, Lord of Lara. They had:

1. Charles III, Count of Alençon (1337 – 5 July 1375, Lyon), made Archbishop of Lyon in 1365.
2. Philip of Alençon (1338–1397, Rome), made Bishop of Beauvais in 1356, later Cardinal, Archbishop of Rouen, Latin Patriarch of Jerusalem, Patriarch of Aquileia, and Bishop of Ostia and Sabina
3. Pierre II, Count of Alençon (1340 – 20 September 1404), married Marie Chamaillart, Viscountess of Beaumont-au-Maine.
4. Isabelle of Alençon (1342 – 3 September 1379, Poissy), became a nun.
5. Robert, Count of Perche (1344–1377), married on 5 April 1374 Joan of Rohan, daughter of John I, Viscount of Rohan.

== Death ==
Charles entered the War of the Breton Succession in 1340, and was subsequently killed at the Battle of Crécy. Like his father, he was buried in the now-demolished church of the Couvent des Jacobins in Paris; his effigy is now in the Basilica of Saint-Denis.

He was succeeded in his counties by his eldest son Charles III.

== Arms ==
Coat of arms of the counts and dukes of Alençon of the House of Valois

Coat of arms of the counts of Perche

== Sources ==
- Autrand, Francoise (1994). Charles V: Le Sage (in French). Fayard.
- Doubleday, Simon R. (2001). The Lara Family: Crown and Nobility in Medieval Spain. Harvard University Press.
- Henneman, John Bell (1971). Royal Taxation in Fourteenth-Century France: The Development of War Financing, 1322-1359. Princeton University Press.
- Lalou, Elisabeth; Fawtier, Robert (2007). Itinéraire de Philippe IV le Bel (1285-1314): Introduction. Académie des inscriptions et belles lettres.
- de Venette, Jean (1953). Newhall, Richard A. (ed.). The Chronicle of Jean de Venette. Translated by Birdsall, Jean. Columbia University Press.

Preceded by Charles I	Count of Alençon and Perche; 1325–1346	Succeeded by Charles III
