= Jeanne of Orléans (1462–1520) =

Princess of France (1462–1520)

- Duchess
- Born: 1462
- Died: 1520
- Noble family: House of Valois
- Spouse: Charles-Francis of Coëtivy
- Issue: Louise of Coëtivy
- Father: John, Count of Angoulême
- Mother: Margaret of Rohan

Jeanne of Orléans (1462–1520) was a princess of France.

== Family ==
She was the daughter of John, Count of Angoulême and Margaret of Rohan, sister of Charles, Count of Angoulême, and paternal aunt of King Francis I of France.

Jeanne was married to Charles-Francis of Coëtivy, Count of Taillebourg and Prince of Didonne, son of Olivier of Coëtivy and Marie de Valois. She was well educated and commissioned at least one manuscript.,
