= Marie of Brittany =

Marie or Mary of Brittany may refer to:

- Marie of Brittany, Countess of Saint-Pol (1268–1339), daughter of John II, Duke of Brittany and Beatrice of England; wife of Guy IV, Count of Saint-Pol
- Marie of Brittany (1302–1371), daughter of Arthur II, Duke of Brittany and Yolande of Dreux; became a nun at Poissy
- Marie of Brittany, Lady of La Guerche (1391–1446), daughter of John IV, Duke of Brittany and Joan of Navarre; wife of Jean I, Duke of Alençon
- Marie of Brittany (1424-1477), daughter of Richard of Brittany and Marguerite d'Orléans; Abbess of Fontevraud Abbey
- Marie of Brittany, Viscountess of Rohan (1444–1506), daughter of Francis I, Duke of Brittany and Isabella of Scotland; wife of John II, Viscount of Rohan
- Marie of Brittany, Abbess of Fontevraud Abbey (1424-1477)
