= Philip, Count of Vertus =

French nobleman (1396–1420)

- Valois-Orleans coat of arms
- Born: 21 July 1396; Asnières-sur-Oise, Val d'Oise, France
- Died: 1 September 1420 (aged 24); Beaugency, Loiret, France
- Noble family: House of Valois-Orléans
- Father: Louis I, Duke of Orléans
- Mother: Valentina Visconti

Philip of Orléans, Count of Vertus (French: Philippe d'Orléans, comte de Vertus, 21/24 July 1396 – 1 September 1420), was the second son of Louis I, Duke of Orléans, and Valentina Visconti, and a grandson of King Charles V of France. His older brother was the noted poet Charles I, Duke of Orléans and his younger brother was John, Count of Angoulême.

== Life ==
Little is known about his early years. His first important action took place on 15 April 1410, when he joined the Armagnac party in the League of Gien. Under the terms of the Peace of Auxerre (22 August 1412), Philip was betrothed to Catherine, demoiselle de Guise, second daughter of John the Fearless, Duke of Burgundy; in the end, this marriage was never celebrated.

He served in the army of King Charles VI of France and accompanied him to Picardy and Artois (1414). When his brother Charles was captured at the Battle of Agincourt (25 October 1415), he took care of all the family domains and supported the Dauphin, Charles (future Charles VII), in his quarrel against the English and Burgundians. In 1418, Philip was appointed Lieutenant General of the King in the army which besieged and took Parthenay in Poitou. He remained in the service of the Dauphin and his army in Poitou and Berry, with custody of the lands situated between the Seine and Loire.

Philip of Vertus suddenly died at the age of twenty-four, unmarried and without legitimate issue. His unexpected death was a terrible blow to the cause of the Dauphin, as he was his best supporter.

He left a natural son named Philip Anthony, called the Bastard of Vertus, who entered the service of his uncle Duke Charles I of Orléans in 1436, and was later governor of Blois. He also participated in the siege of Montereau which was occupied by the English, and was appointed governor of Coucy by King Charles VII in 1443; his death took place certainly before 18 July 1445, when the executors of his will took actions related to his possessions. He died without issue (a family "of Vertus" claimed descendance from the bastard, but there is no indication who supported this argument and its origin remains unclear).

According to a legend, the sculptor Camille Claudel and her brother, the poet Paul Claudel, descended from another bastard of Philip of Vertus conceived by him in his lands of Champagne.

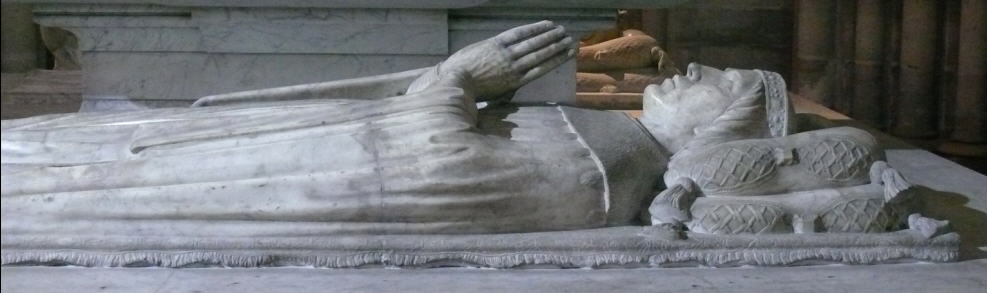
Phillip's tomb beside his parents

Philip, Count of Vertus House of Valois-Orléans Cadet branch of the Capetian dynasty Born: 21 April 1396 Died: 1 September 1420
Regnal titles
Preceded by Valentina	Count of Vertus; 1408–1420	Succeeded by Margaret
