= Margaret, Countess of Vertus =

Margaret
- Countess of Vertus and Etampes
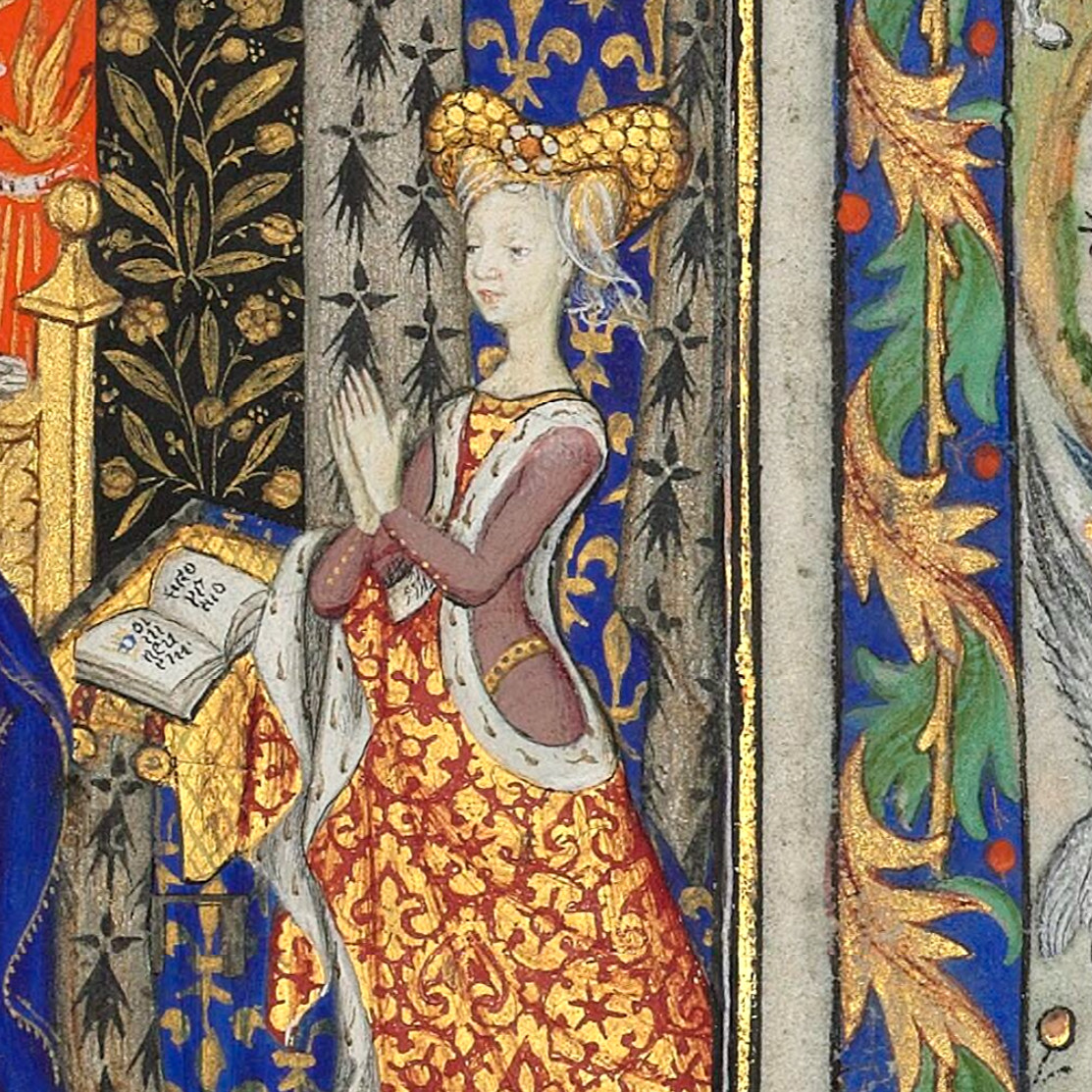
- Detail of a folio from the Book of Hours of Marguerite, c. 1430
- Born: 4 April 1406
- Died: 24 April 1466 (aged 60); Abbey at Guiche, Order of Sainte Claire near Blois
- Burial: Abbey at Guiche, Order of Sainte Claire near Blois
- Spouse: Richard of Brittany, Count of Étampes
- Issue among others: Francis II, Duke of Brittany; Catherine, Princess of Orange
- House: Valois
- Father: Louis I, Duke of Orléans
- Mother: Valentina Visconti

Margaret, Countess of Vertus (French: Marguerite d'Orléans; 4 April 1406 – 1466), was a French vassal, ruling Countess of Vertus and Etampes 1420–1466. She was the daughter of Louis I, Duke of Orléans, and Valentina Visconti.

== Life ==
Margaret was the daughter of Louis I, Duke of Orléans, and Valentina Visconti. Her mother was the daughter of Gian Galeazzo Visconti, Duke of Milan, and Isabella of France. Her brother was Charles, Duke of Orléans, captured at Agincourt and imprisoned for twenty-five years in England and who during his long captivity, became the greatest poet of the 15th century in the French language.

In 1423 she married Richard of Montfort, son of John IV, Duke of Brittany, and Joanna of Navarre. Margaret succeeded her brother Philip as Countess of Vertus. Margaret, widowed in 1438, lived for a long time at Longchamp and in other monasteries with her younger daughters, Margaret and Madeleine. She was described as a very pious woman.

The Book of Hours of Marguerite d'Orleans, regarded as a defining example of the Illustrated Prayer Book of the Fifteenth Century, was made for her so that she might practice her devotion on a daily basis.

She obtained a declaration from the Cardinal of Estouteville that sheltered her liberty and that of her daughters as they moved among the convents and religious monasteries of northern France. She finally retired to the Abbey at Guiche, order of Sainte Claire near Blois, where she died 24 April 1466 at the age of sixty.

=== County of Étampes ===
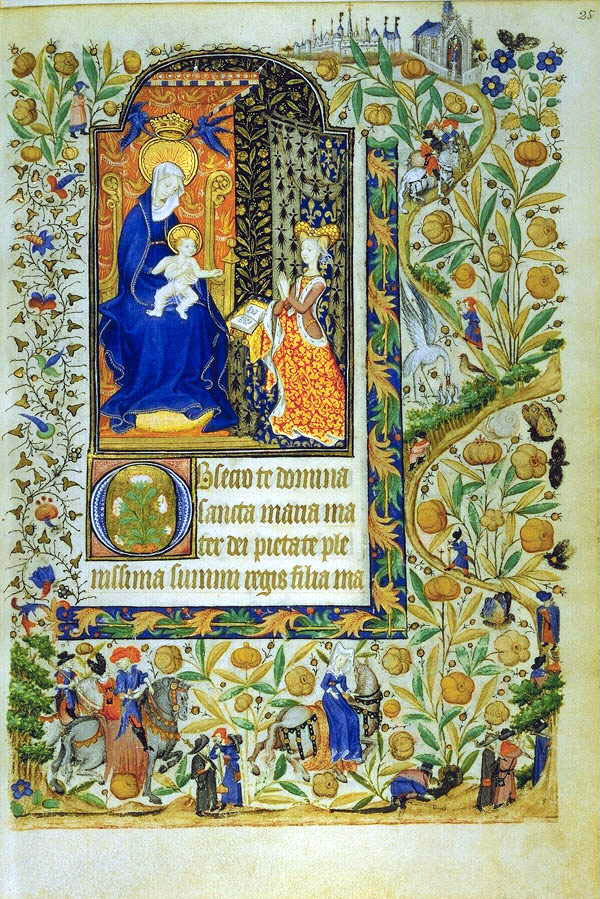
A folio from the Book of Hours of Margaret of Orléans, western France, commissioned around 1430. The combined arms of Brittany and Orléans appearing behind the lady praying to the Virgin indicate that this book was produced for Marguerite d'Orléans. The artist's decorative genius is affirmed most strongly in the imaginative borders

With her father's death, Margaret inherited the rights to the County of Étampes, and was named countess with her husband as count, in 1423, which was recovered from the crown lands after the death in 1416, of its last incumbent lord, John, Duke of Berry. However, the claim was disputed by the then Duke of Burgundy, Philip the Good, who succeeded his father John the Fearless in 1419 after the latter's assassination by the agents of Dauphin Charles. Philip took possession and ruled the county personally, (possibly wresting it from Richard in vengeance of his father's death) till 1434, after which he gave it to John II, Count of Nevers, his first cousin, who kept it in peaceful possession, until it was reverted to Richard in September 1435 (who died in 1438) by the former Dauphin, who was now King Charles VII of France. The new king confirmed his gift to the deceased duke by letters patent presented to his widow in 1442. However, this decision was contested by the Attorney General of the Parlement, who argued that the County should have been reunited with the Crown, after the death of Richard. It was taken back from Margaret's son Francis in 1478 and in the month of April of the following year, Charles's son and successor, King Louis XI gave it to John of Foix, Viscount of Narbonne, whose wife Marie of Orleans was a niece of Margaret and sister of the future King Louis XII.

== Issue ==
- Marie of Brittany (22 June 1424 – 9 October 1477), Abbess of Fontevrault since 1457 until her death.
- Isabelle of Brittany (2 February 1426 – 9 February 1438).
- Catherine of Brittany (Nantes, 28 May 1428 – 22 June 1476), Dame de l'Epine-Gaudin; married on 19 August 1438 to William VII of Chalon-Arlay, Prince of Orange, Count of Penthièvre and Seigneur de Cerlier.
- Duke Francis II of Brittany (23 June 1433 – 9 September 1488)
- Unnamed son (b. 1436 – d. 19 December 1436).
- Margaret of Brittany (22 November 1437 – 1466), a nun.
- Madeleine of Brittany (1 May 1439 – 29 March 1462), a nun.

== Legacy ==
Margaret is best remembered for the Book of Hours produced for her. One of the most exquisite examples of fifteenth-century French illumination, this Book of Hours was executed in a complex series of stages, starting with the text as early as 1421, its decoration inspired by diverse sources and artists. The miniature showing Margaret praying to the Virgin served as the source for the historical lithographs of Margaret published by Delpech in 1820.

== Sources ==
- Booton, Diane E. (2016). Manuscripts, Market and the Transition to Print in Late Medieval Brittany. Taylor & Francis. ISBN 9780754666233.
- Brown-Grant, Rosalind; Damen, Mario, eds. (2025). Pas D'armes and Late Medieval Chivalry: A Casebook. Liverpool University Press. ISBN 9781835537688.
- Devries, Kelly (2011). Joan of Arc: A Military Leader. History Press. ISBN 9780752468341.
- George, Hereford Brooke (1875). Genealogical Tables Illustrative of Modern History. Oxford Clarendon Press.
- McLeod, Enid (1970). Charles of Orleans, Prince and Poet. Viking Press.
- Welch, Evelyn S. (1995). Art and Authority in Renaissance Milan. Yale University Press. ISBN 9780300063516.

Regnal titles
Preceded by Philip	Countess of Vertus; 1420–1466 with Richard	Succeeded by Francis II of Brittany
