= Charles, Count of Angoulême =

Count of Angoulême from 1467 to 1496

Charles of Orléans
- Count of Angoulême
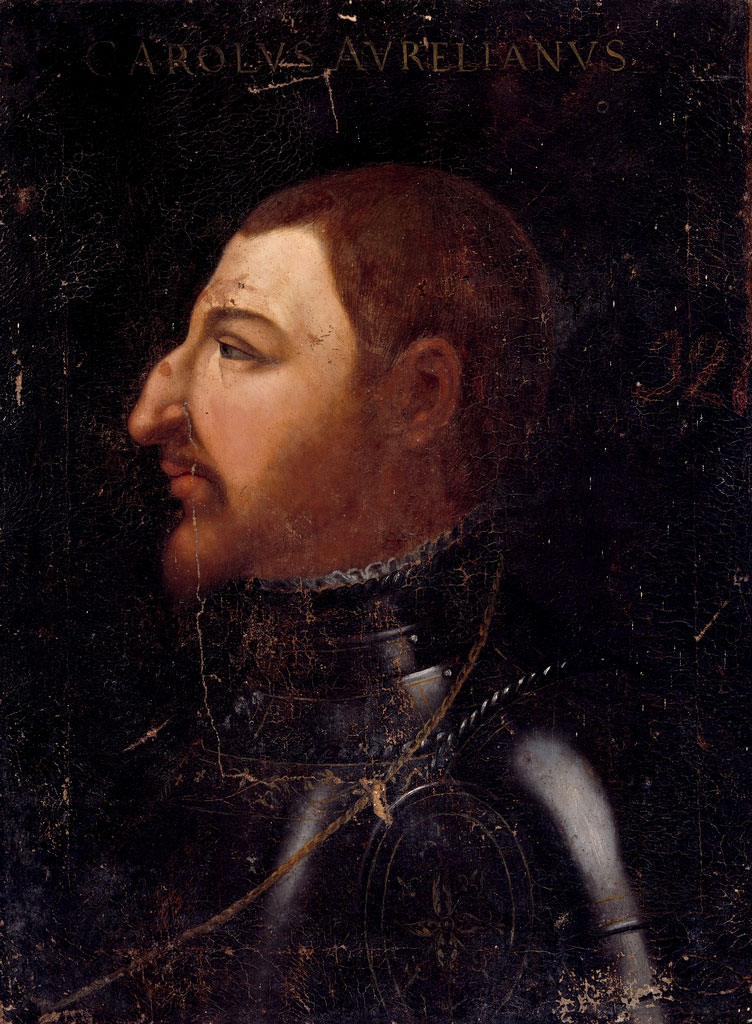
- Posthumous portrait
- Born: 1459
- Died: 1 January 1496 (aged 36–37)
- Spouse: Louise of Savoy
- Issue: Marguerite, Queen of Navarre; Francis I of France; Jeanne d'Angoulême (illegitimate)
- House: Valois-Angoulême
- Father: John, Count of Angoulême
- Mother: Margaret of Rohan

Charles of Orléans (1459 – 1 January 1496) (French: Charles d'Orléans) was the Count of Angoulême from 1467 until his death. He succeeded his father, John, and was initially under the regency of his mother, Margaret of Rohan, assisted by Jean I de La Rochefoucauld, one of his vassals.

Charles commissioned the luxuriously illustrated Heures de Charles d'Angoulême.

== Family ==
Charles was a grandson of Louis I, Duke of Orléans, a younger son of King Charles V of France. He was thus a member of the Orléans cadet branch of the ruling House of Valois. The Orléans came to the throne in 1498 in the person of Charles's cousin Louis XII, who was followed in 1515 by Charles's own son Francis I.

=== Marriage and issue ===
Charles married Louise of Savoy, daughter of Philip the Landless and Margaret of Bourbon, on 16 February 1488.

They had:

- Marguerite of Angoulême (11 April 1492 – 21 December 1549)
- François of Angoulême (12 September 1494 – 31 March 1547), who became King of France as Francis I.

Charles also had two illegitimate daughters by his mistress Antoinette de Polignac, Dame de Combronde (1470-1537), who was his wife's lady-in-waiting. They had two daughters:

- Jeanne d'Angoulême (c. 1490 – after 1531/1538), married firstly Jean Aubin, Seigneur de Malicorne, and secondly, Jean IV de Longwy, Baron of Pagny, by whom she had three daughters. The youngest, Jacqueline de Longwy (died 28 August 1561), in her own turn married Louis III de Bourbon, Duke of Montpensier.
- Madeleine d'Angoulême, Abbess of Fontevrault (died 26 October 1543)

He also had an illegitimate daughter by mistress Jeanne Le Conte:

- Souveraine d'Angoulême (died 23 February 1551), married Michel III de Gaillard, Seigneur de Chilly. In 1534 Married French Ambassador Louis de Perreau, Sieur de Castillon.

=== Ancestry ===
Ancestors of Charles, Count of Angoulême

16. John II of France
8. Charles V of France
17. Bonne of Luxembourg
4. Louis I, Duke of Orleans
18. Peter I, Duke of Bourbon
9. Joanna of Bourbon
19. Isabella of Valois
2. John, Count of Angoulême
20. Galeazzo II Visconti
10. Gian Galeazzo Visconti
21. Bianca of Savoy
5. Valentina Visconti
22. John II of France (= 16)
11. Isabella of Valois
23. Bonne of Luxembourg (= 17)
1. Charles, Count of Angoulême
24. John I, Viscount of Rohan c. 1324-1395
12. Alan VIII, Viscount of Rohan c. 1360-1429
25. Jeanne de Léon c. 1330-1372
6. Alan IX, Viscount of Rohan c. 1382-1462
26. Olivier V de Clisson
13. Béatrix de Clisson c. 1341/81-1448
27. Catherine de Laval c. 1335-1360
3. Margaret of Rohan 1412-1497
28. John of Montfort
14. John IV, Duke of Brittany
29. Joanna of Flanders
7. Margaret of Brittany 1392-1428
30. Charles II of Navarre
15. Joan of Navarre
31. Joan of Valois

== Sources ==
- Knecht, R.J. (1982). Francis I. Cambridge University Press.
- Reid, Jonathan A. (2009). Gow, Andrew Colin (ed.). King's Sister - Queen of Dissent: Marguerite of Navarre (1492-1549) and her Evangelical Network. Vol. 1. Brill.

Charles, Count of Angoulême House of Valois Cadet branch of the Capetian dynasty Born: 1459 Died: 1 January 1496
French nobility
Preceded by Jean	Count of Angoulême; 30 April 1467 – 1 January 1496	Succeeded by François
