= Richard, Count of Étampes =

Richard of Étampes
- Count of Vertus and Étampes
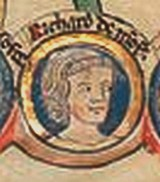
- Born: c. 1396
- Died: 2 June 1438 (aged 41–42); Château de Clisson
- Burial: Nantes Cathedral
- Spouse: Marguerite d'Orléans
- Issue among others...: Francis II, Duke of Brittany; Catherine, Princess of Orange
- House: Dreux-Montfort (House of Montfort-Britanny)
- Father: John IV, Duke of Brittany
- Mother: Joan of Navarre

Richard, Count of Montfort, Vertus, and Étampes (c. 1396 – 2 June 1438), was a Breton nobleman from the House of Dreux-Montfort. Not much is known of his life, except that he was the father of Francis II, Duke of Brittany. In his lifetime, he held many titles and positions. He was appointed captain-general of Guyenne and Poitou in 1419, became the count of Étampes (comte d'Étampes) and lord of Palluau, Bourgomeaux, and Ligron (seigneur de Palluau et de Châteaumur de Thouarcé, de Bourgomeaux-l'Evêque, et de Ligron) on 8 May 1423; and count of Mantes in October 1425.

== Family ==
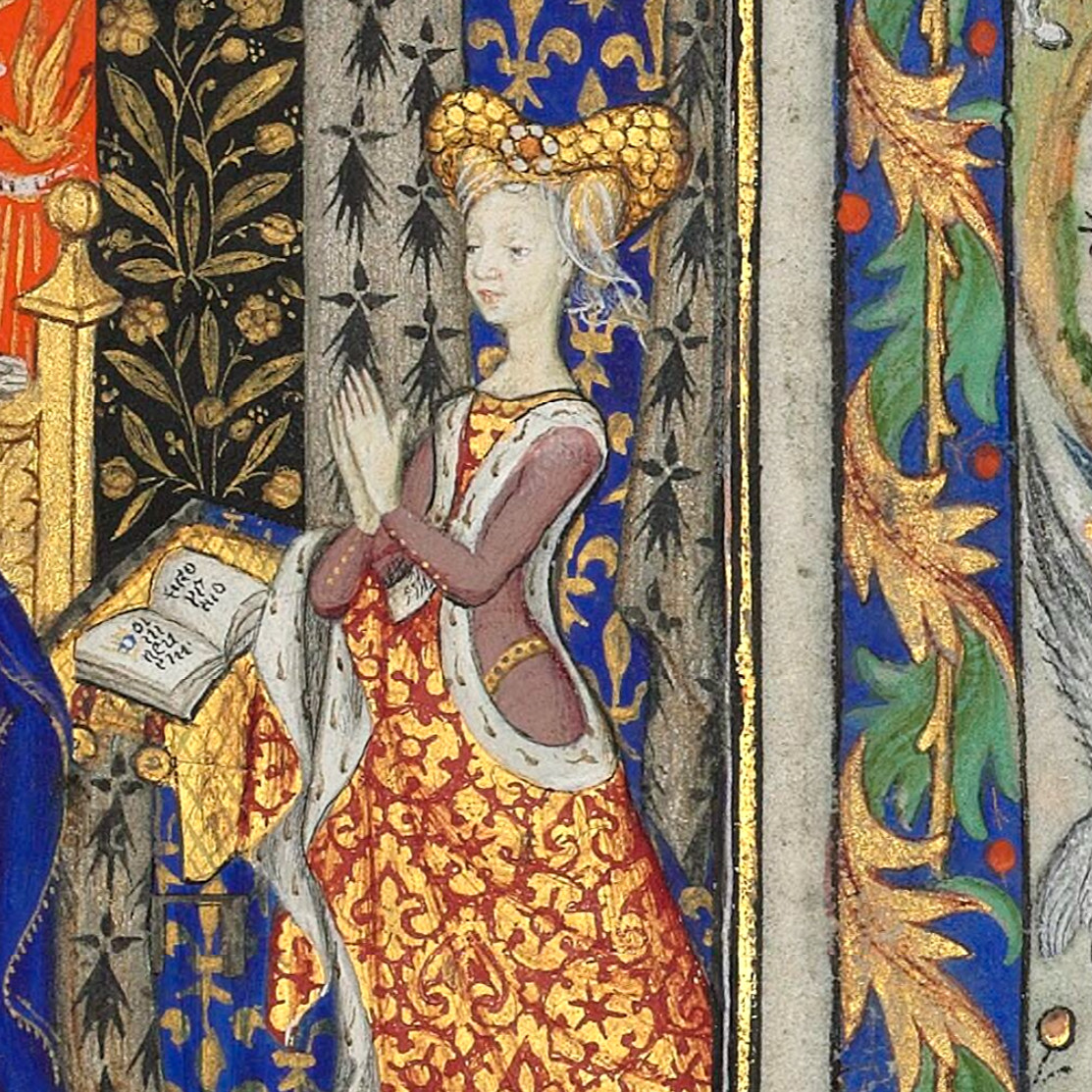
Margaret of Orléans, Richard's wife

He was the eighth child and youngest son of John IV, Duke of Brittany, and his third wife, Joan of Navarre.

In 1423 he married Marguerite d'Orléans, daughter of Louis, duc d'Orléans and Valentina Visconti, a daughter of Giangaleazzo Visconti, Duke of Milan and his first wife, Isabella of Valois.

The bride received the county of Vertus as dowry, thus Richard became count in the right of his wife. She and Richard had:

- Marie of Brittany, Abbess of Fontevraud
- Francis II, Duke of Brittany married Margaret of Brittany
- Isabeau
- Catherine of Brittany, married William of Orange in 1438.
- Marguerite of Brittany, nun at Longchamp
- Madeleine of Brittany

Richard also had a natural daughter by a mistress.

== Count of Étampes ==
On his marriage in 1423, Richard became comte de Vertus-en-Champagne et de Bénon. He also became baron de Clisson, seigneur de Courtenay, de Piffonds, de Houdan et de l'Epine-Gaudin in 1423, and châtelain de Renac et de Bois-Raoul near Redon in 1424.

Richard became Count of Étampes by right of his wife. She inherited the rights to the county from her father and was formally granted them by King Charles VII of France. However, their claim was disputed by Philip the Good, Duke of Burgundy. Presumably, Philip sought to avenge his father's death by disrupting Charles's reign; Charles was most probably responsible for the late duke's assassination in 1419. Philip occupied the duchy and held it personally until 1434, after which he gave it to his cousin, John II, Count of Nevers. Nevertheless, the County was returned to Richard in September 1435.

=== Other relations ===
Richard had many varying and complex relationships with French and English royalty.

His mother Joan later married Henry IV of England, and became Queen of England. Richard's stepbrother and Henry IV's son and successor, Henry V of England, would later claim the throne of France and re-initiate the Hundred Years' War and marry Richard's wife's paternal cousin, Catherine of Valois. His step-nephew, King Henry VI of England, succeeded his grandfather and Richard's wife's uncle, Charles VI to the French throne, as a rival to Dauphin Charles. Coincidentally, Henry's wife, Margaret of Anjou, was the step-daughter of Jeanne de Laval, who was a granddaughter of Richard's brother, John VI, Duke of Brittany. Richard was also distantly related to the Courtenays, who were also descended from Louis VI, through his youngest son, Peter I of Courtenay.

== Succession ==
Richard died on 2 June 1438.

Both of Richard's older brothers had succeeded their father, John IV, as Duke of Brittany. By the time of Richard's death, he had predeceased the remaining claimants to his father's title, save his only legitimate son, Francis II. As a result, Francis II succeeded Richard, his father, as Count of Étampes and Arthur III, his uncle, as Duke of Brittany.

== Sources ==
- Booton, Diane E. (2010). Manuscripts, Market and the Transition to Print in Late Medieval Brittany. Ashgate Publishing Limited.
- George, Hereford Brooke (1875). Genealogical Tables Illustrative of Modern History. Oxford Clarendon Press.
