= Agony in the Garden with the Donor Louis I of Orléans =

Early 15th-century French painting

Agony in the Garden
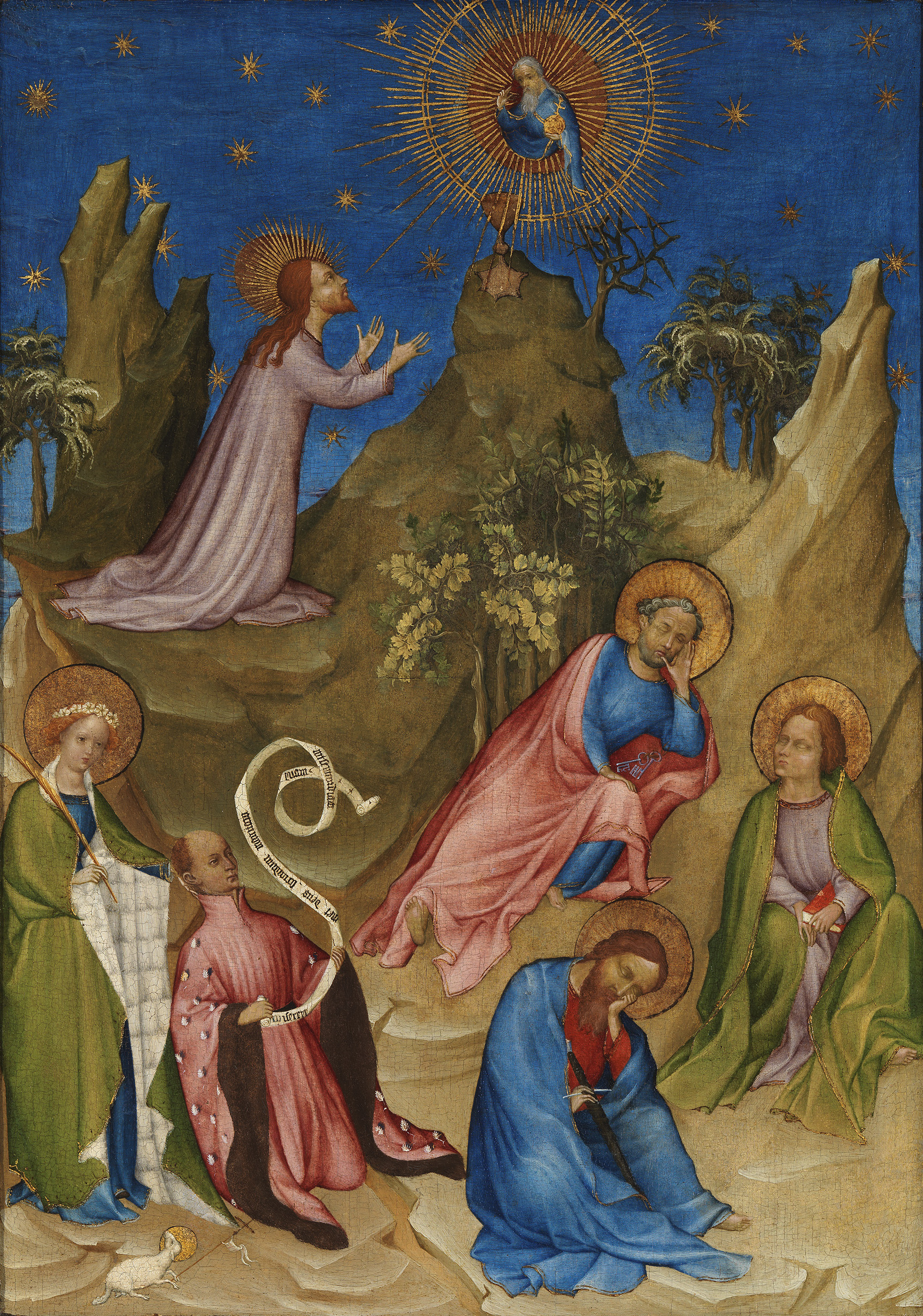
- Artist: Anonymous (possibly Colart de Laon)
- Year: c. 1405–1408
- Medium: Tempera on panel
- Dimensions: 59 cm cm × 43 cm cm ( ×)
- Location: Museo Nacional del Prado, Madrid, Spain

The Agony in the Garden is a French painting of c. 1405–1408 in the International Gothic style, which has been in the Museo del Prado since May 2012. It was produced in Paris on a Baltic oak panel. The artist is unknown, though it could by Colart de Laon (fl. 1377; died before 27 May 1417), who was painter and 'valet de chambre' to Louis I, Duke of Orléans, shown at bottom left and probably the commissioner of the work.
