= Colart de Laon =

French painter

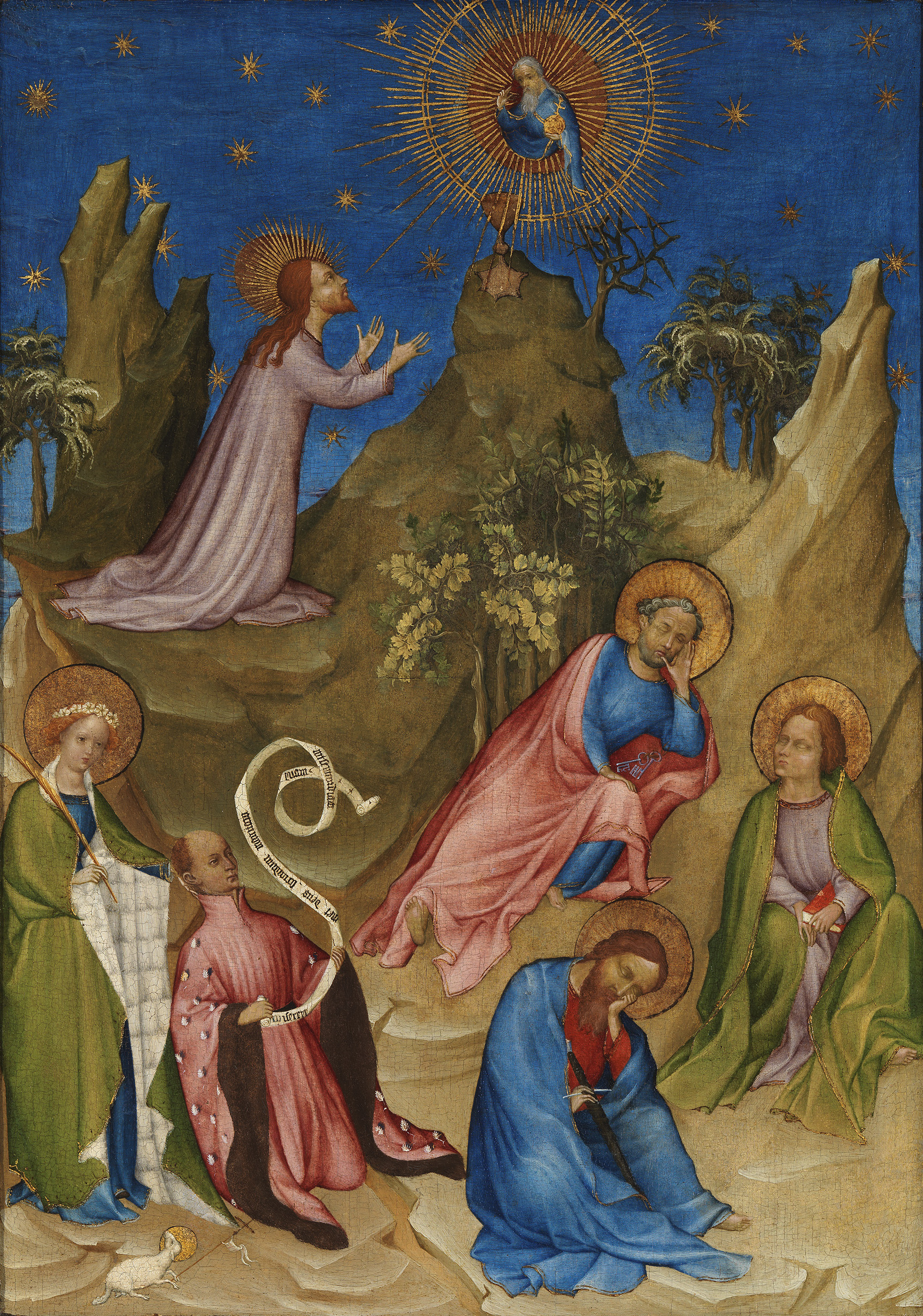
Christ in the Garden of Olives with Saint Agnes and Louis I d’Orleans as a Donor

Colart de Laon (active 1377–1411; died before 27 May 1417) was a French painter.

== Biography ==
First mentioned in 1377 as working for Philip the Bold, he later became valet de chambre to Louis I, Duke of Orléans from 1391 on and afterwards to his son Charles until at least 1411. While no surviving works have been with certainty attributed to him, some panel paintings are considered likely to be his work. Those mentioned in contemporary sources include a number of large works for Philip the Bold in 1395, which were placed in Chartres Cathedral, Virgin, St. John and the Trinity for Louis I for a church in Paris in 1396, and in 1397 a reliquary chest for Queen Isabeau of Bavaria and a panel painting of Louis the Pious and Louis of Toulouse. In 1406 he was working on a large panel for the French Parliament.

As was typical for court painters in this period, his activities weren't restricted to panel paintings but he is also mentioned as creator of decorations for festivities, and cartons for tapestries.

In May 2012, the Prado Museum in Madrid acquired a panel, presumably the central part of a triptych, depicting Christ in the Garden of Olives with Saint Agnes and Louis I d’Orleans as a Donor. It is the only known contemporary depiction of Louis I.

An Angel of the Annunciation in the Museum of Laon, the right wing of a triptych, which is attributed to the Master of the Retable of Pierre de Wissant, may be another work by Colart de Laon.

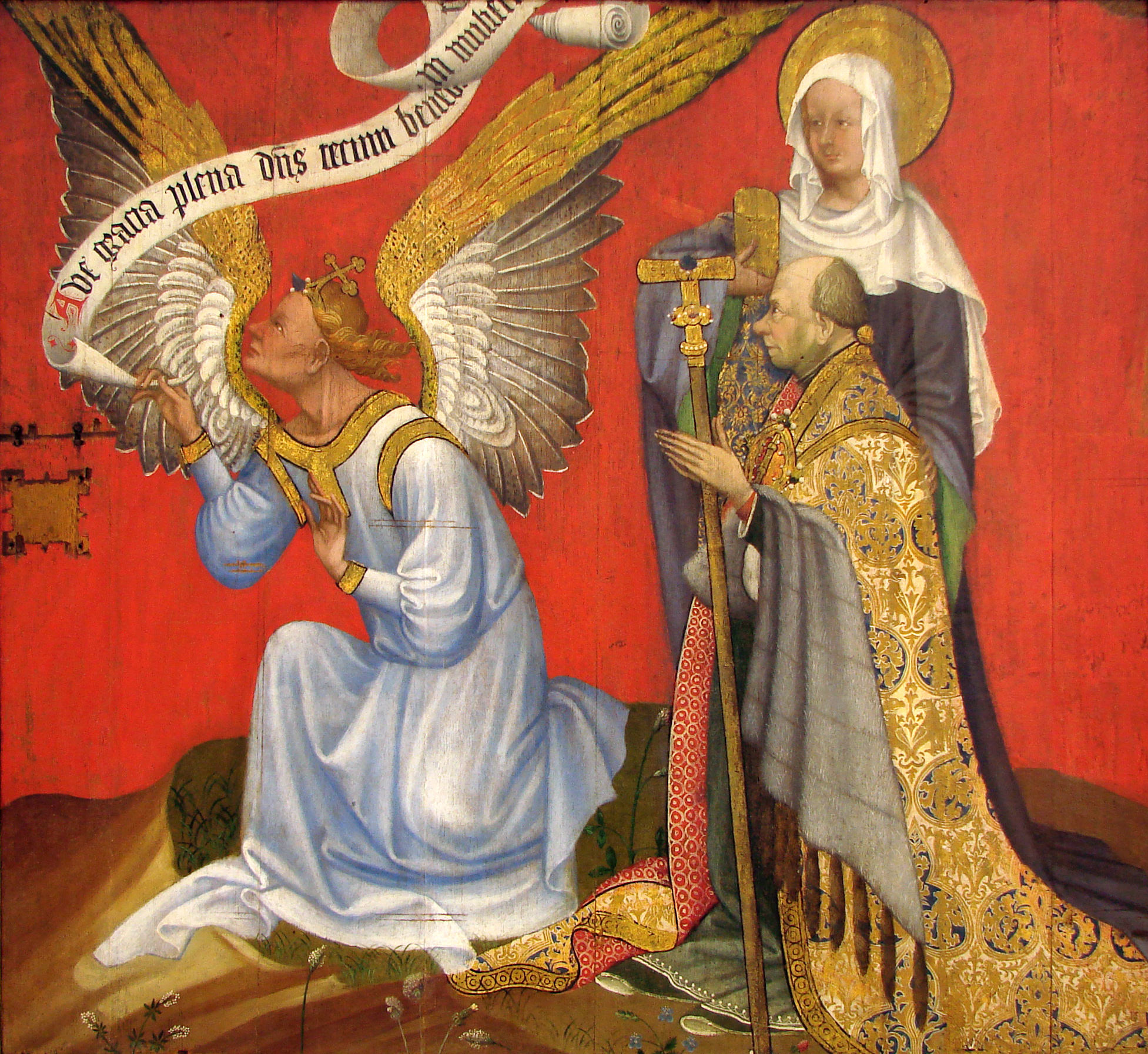
Annunciation by the Master of the Retable of Pierre de Wissant

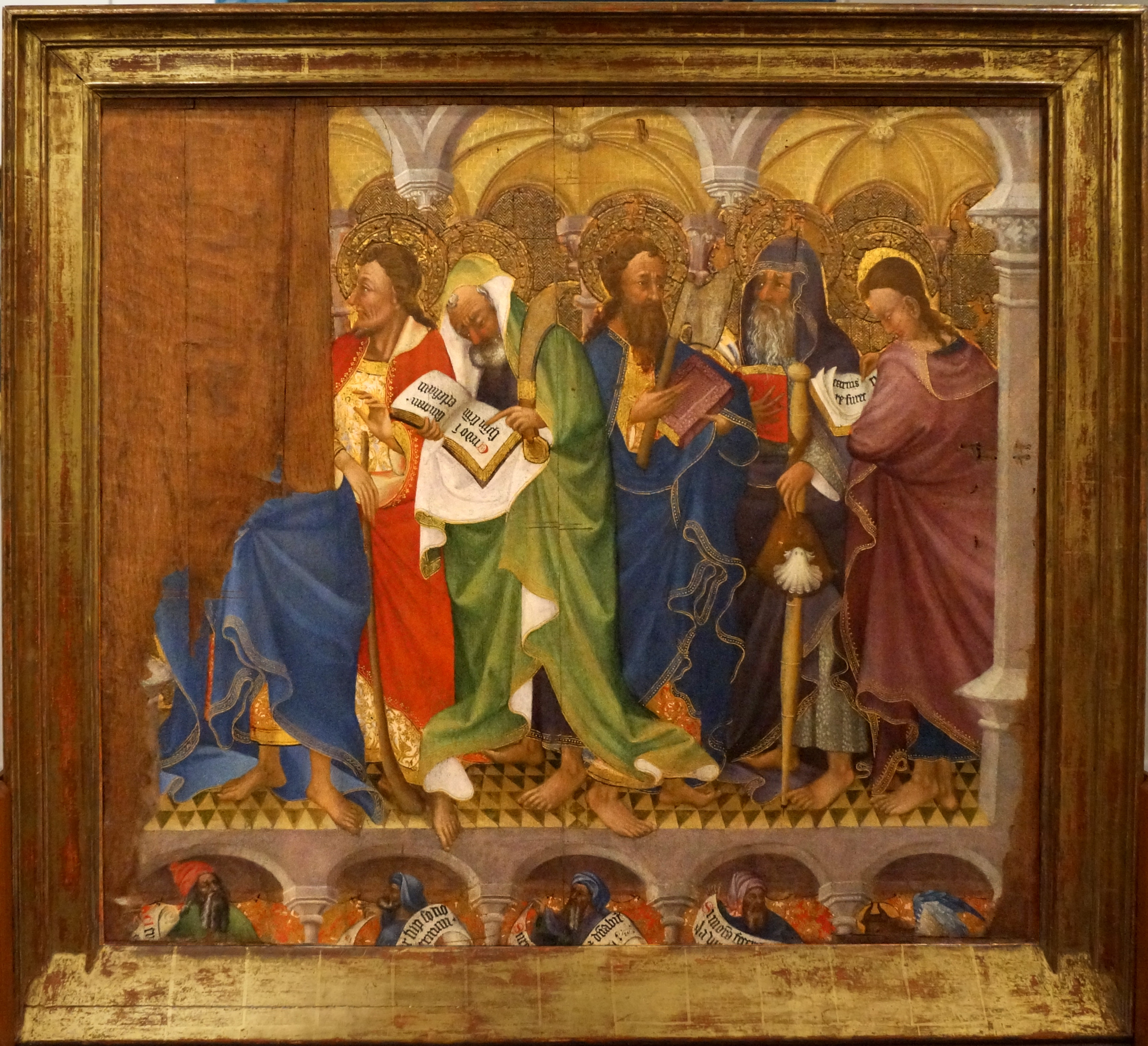
Reverse of the Retable of Pierre de Wissant
