= John, Count of Angoulême =

French nobleman

John of Orléans
- Count of Angoulême
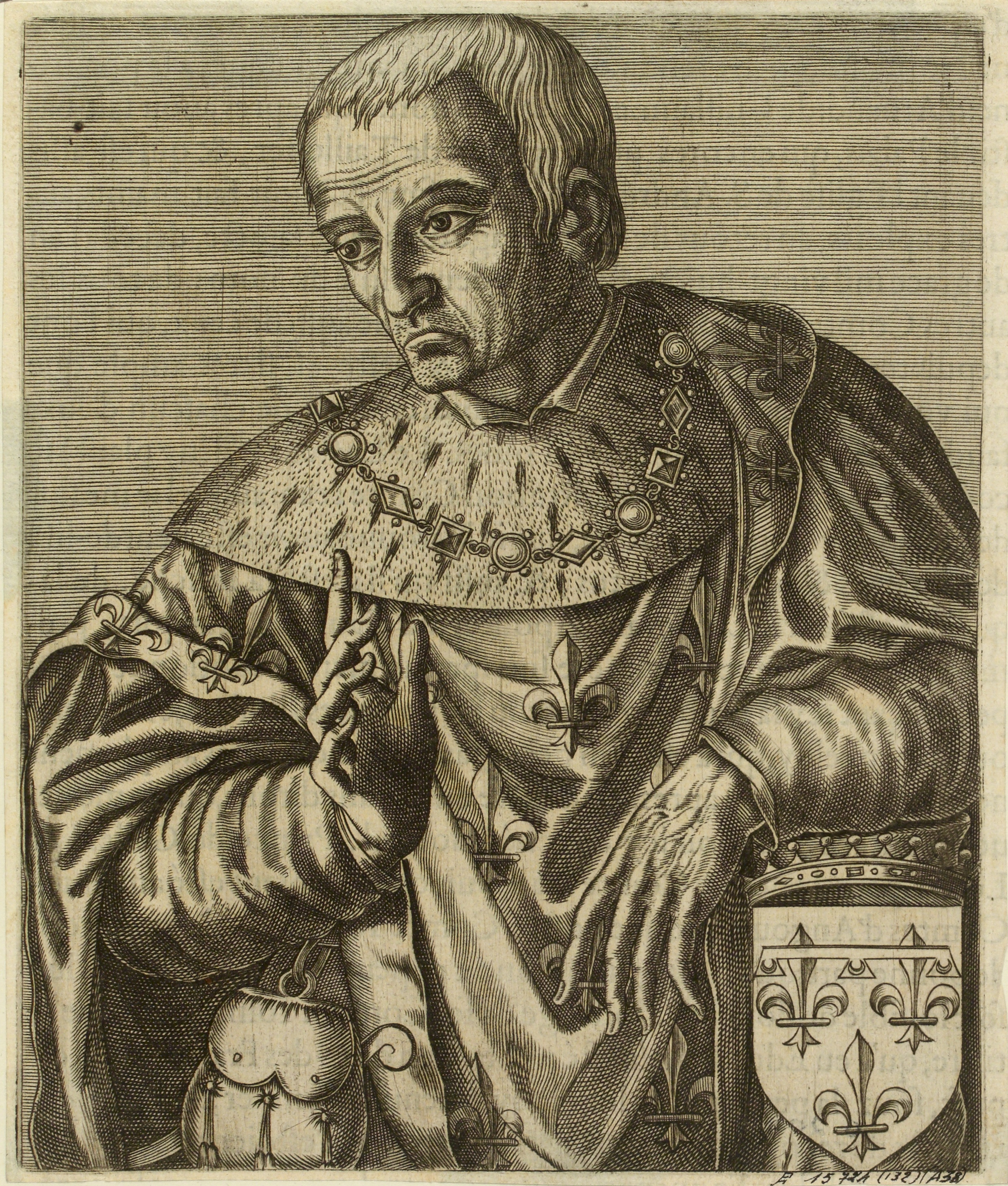
- Born: 28 June 1399
- Died: 30 April 1467 (aged 67); Cognac, France
- Burial: Angoulême Cathedral, Angoulême, France
- Spouse: Marguerite de Rohan
- Issue: Charles, Count of Angoulême; Joan
- House: Valois-Angoulême
- Father: Louis I, Duke of Orléans
- Mother: Valentina Visconti

John of Orléans (French: Jean, 26 June 1399 – 30 April 1467), Count of Angoulême and Périgord, was the younger son of Louis I, Duke of Orléans, and Valentina Visconti, and grandson of Charles V of France. He was the younger brother of the noted poet, Charles, Duke of Orléans, and paternal grandfather of Francis I of France.

John was handed over to the English in 1412, according to the terms of the Treaty of Buzançais, and not released until 1444. In 1415 he was joined by his older brother Charles, with whom he shared an interest in literature. He had to sell part of his estates to pay for his ransom, but still collected many books. After that, he fought under the orders of his illegitimate half-brother, Jean de Dunois, driving the English out of Guyenne in 1451.

== Marriage and issue ==
On 31 August 1449, he married Marguerite de Rohan, daughter of Alain IX of Rohan and Margaret of Brittany. They had:

- Louis (1455–1458)
- Charles (1459–1496). Father of Francis I, King of France
- Joan (1462–1520), who married Charles François de Coetivy, count de Taillebourg

He also had an illegitimate son, Jean de Valois, bastard of Angoulême, who was legitimised in 1458.

== Death ==
"Good Count John" died on 30 April 1467. He is buried in the Cathedral of Angoulême.

== Sources ==
- Adams, Tracy (2010). The Life and Afterlife of Isabeau of Bavaria. Johns Hopkins University Press.
- Booton, Diane E. (2010). Manuscripts, Market and the Transition to Print in Late Medieval Brittany. Ashgate.
- Knecht, R.J. (1994). Renaissance Warrior and Patron: The Reign of Francis I. Cambridge University Press.
- Kosto, Adam J. (2012). Hostages in the Middle Ages. Oxford University Press.
- O'Day, Rosemary (2010). The Routledge Companion to the Tudor Age. Routledge.
- Thevet, André (2009). Portraits from the French Renaissance and the Wars of Religion. Pennsylvania State University Press.

John, Count of Angoulême House of Valois-Angoulême Cadet branch of the Capetian dynasty Born: 26 June 1399 Died: 30 April 1467
French nobility
Preceded by New Creation	Count of Angoulême ?–30 April 1467	Succeeded by Charles
