= Isabella, Countess of Vertus =

Isabella
- Countess of Vertus
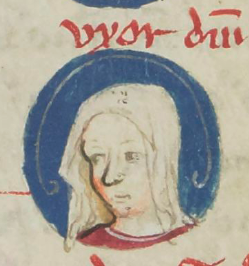
- Born: 1 October 1348; Château de Bois de Vincennes, France
- Died: 11 September 1372 (aged 23); Pavia
- Spouse: Gian Galeazzo Visconti
- Issue: Gian Galeazzo Visconti; Azzone Visconti; Valentina, Duchess of Orléans; Carlo Visconti
- House: Valois
- Father: John II of France
- Mother: Bonne of Bohemia

Isabella of France (1 October 1348 – 11 September 1372) was a French princess and member of the House of Valois, as well as the wife of Gian Galeazzo Visconti, who after her death became Duke of Milan.

== Life ==
Born in Bois de Vincennes, Isabella was the youngest daughter of King John II of France by his first wife, Bonne of Bohemia.

Count Amadeus VI of Savoy arranged her marriage with his nephew Gian Galeazzo Visconti. As her dowry, Isabella received the county of Sommières, exchanged later for the county of Vertus. On 8 October 1360, Isabella and Gian Galeazzo were married in Milan, and six months later, in April 1361, she was declared sovereign Countess of Vertus. Following her marriage, Isabella brought her collection of French books to Milan. When her daughter, Valentina, traveled to France for her marriage, she brought twelve books of Italian origin. The couple had four children:

- Gian Galeazzo, born 1366
- Azzone, 1368–1380
- Valentina (b. Pavia, 1371 – d. Château de Blois, Loir-et-Cher, 14 December 1408), married on 17 August 1389 to Louis I, Duke of Orléans
- Carlo, born 1372.

Only Valentina lived to adulthood; Isabella died giving birth to Carlo in Pavia in 1372 and was buried in the church of San Francesco.

== Sources ==
- Adams, Tracy (2010). The Life and Afterlife of Isabeau of Bavaria. The Johns Hopkins University Press.
- Bell, Susan Groag (1988). "Medieval Women Book Owners: Arbiters of Lay Piety and Ambassadors of Culture". In Erler, Mary; Kowaleski, Maryanne (eds.). Women and Power in the Middle Ages. The University of Georgia Press. pp. 149–187.
- D'Ancona, Mirella Levi (1990). "La Vergine Maria nell'Offiziolo Visconteo: Parte I: Il Ms. BR 397 della Biblioteca Nazionale di Firenze". La Bibliofilía (in Italian). 92 (2 (maggio-agosto)). Casa Editrice Leo S. Olschki s.r.l.: 109–143.
- Hay, Denys (1977). The Italian Renaissance in Its Historical Background (2nd ed.). Cambridge University Press.
- Ward, A.W.; Prothero, G.W.; Leathes, Stanley, eds. (1934). The Cambridge Modern History. Vol. XIII. Cambridge at the University Press.

Regnal titles
New title	Countess of Vertus; April 1361 – 11 September 1372 with Gian Galeazzo	Succeeded by Valentina
