= Marie of Brittany, Abbess of Fontevraud Abbey =

Reformer of a large medieval abbey order

Marie of Brittany
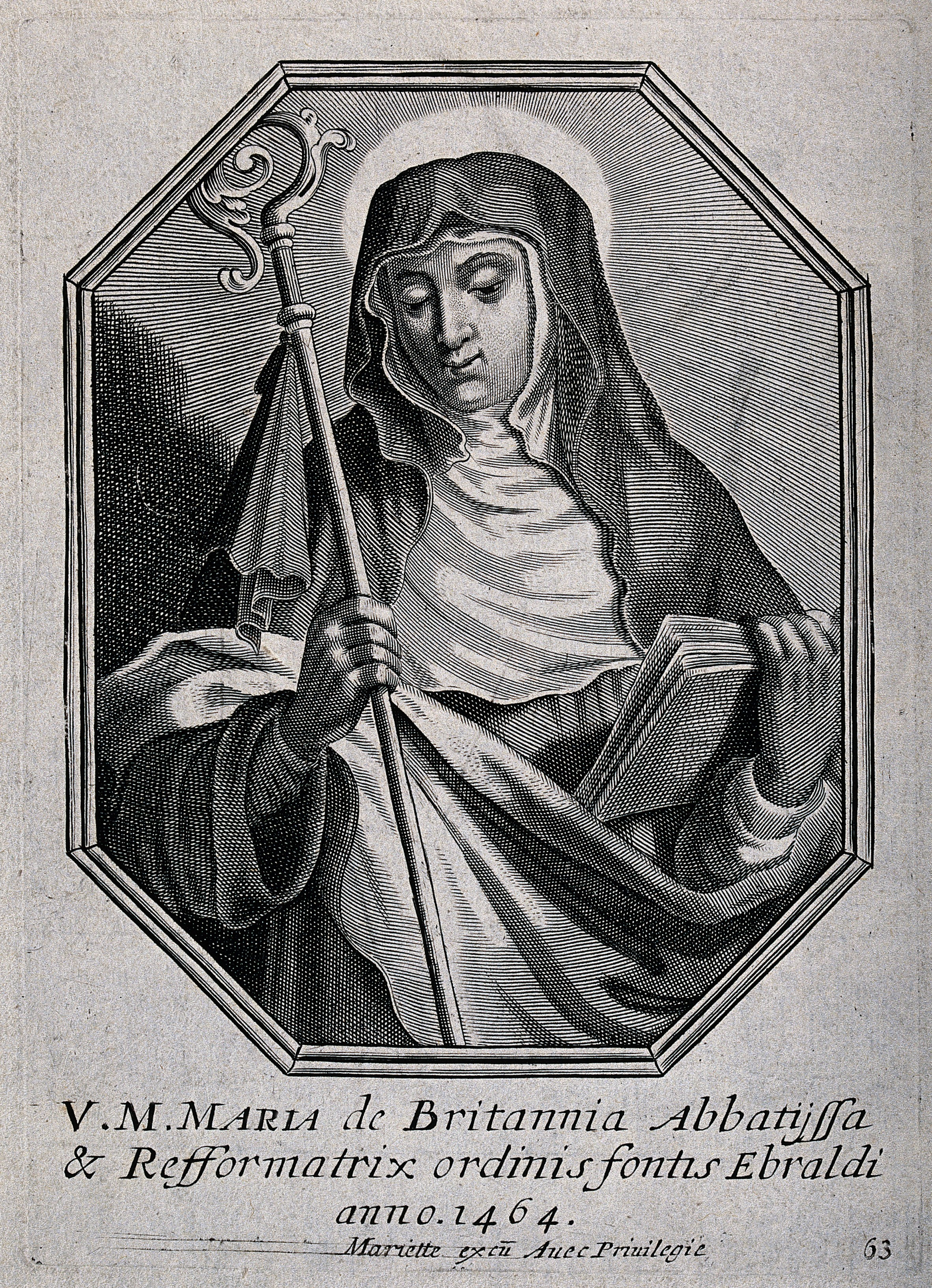
- Born: 1424
- Died: October 19, 1477 (aged 52–53)
- Resting place: Church of La Madeleine, Orléans
- Known for: Abbess
- Parents: Richard, Count of Étampes (father); Margaret, Countess of Vertus (mother)

Marie of Brittany (1424 – 1477), was the Abbess of Fontevraud Abbey in Southern France from 1457 to 1477. She was the first child of Richard Count of Étamps and Margaret Countess of Vertus. During her time as Abbess, Marie instituted considerable reforms to Fontevraud Abbey under the commission of Pope Sixtus IV.

== Biography ==
Marie was born into two powerful aristocratic families. Her mother, Margaret the Countess of Vertus, was the granddaughter of Charles V and her father was the son of Joan of Navarre through her first husband, the Duke of Brittany.

Marie's family was known for their large collection of books, Marie's personal collection would eventually grow to at least 104 books. Marie was appointed Abbess of Fontevraud in 1455.

Marie died in 1477 in the convent of Madeleine lès Orléans. Her remains were uncovered under the choir of the chapel during archaeological research in 1999.

== Reforms of Fontevraud Abbey ==
Since its founding by Robert of Arbrissel in 1101, the Abbey existed under a modified rule of St. Benedict and a double monastery system. Robert's original design for the Order elevated the role of the Abbess as the administrative leader of both nuns and monks. Fontevraud also existed under the direction of the Holy See rather than its local Bishop, giving the Abbey significant regional independence.

After her appointment as Abbess of Fontrevraud in 1457, Marie was commissioned by Pope Sixtus IV to reform the Rule of the Abbey. The new Regle de Marie de Bretagne included:

- Exclusion of the consideration of dowries when admitting novices
- Creating stricter rules around communal property and vows of poverty
- Age restrictions for novices and professions for both nuns and monks
- Stricter enclosure for nuns
- The male sections of the order would no longer be under the decree of the abbess but under the local bishop

The Pope approved the new rule in 1476. While these changes were accepted at many of the Fontevraud houses during Marie's lifetime, the mother house did not accept the new rule until the instillation of Abbess Renée de Bourbon.
