= House of Valois =

Cadet branch of the Capetian dynasty

- Parent house: Capetian dynasty
- Country: Kingdom of France (1328–1589); Duchy of Burgundy (1363–1482); Kingdom of Naples (1389–1399, 1435–1442, 1501–1504); Duchy of Milan (1499–1512, 1515–1521); Duchy of Brittany (1514–1547); Principality of Neuchâtel (1543–1707 through illegitimate branch); Polish-Lithuanian Commonwealth (1573–1575)
- Founded: 1284; 742 years ago
- Founder: Charles, Count of Valois
- Final ruler: Henry III of France in France; Marie de Nemours in Neuchâtel
- Cadet branches: Valois-Orléans; Valois-Angoulême; Valois-Saint-Remy (illegitimate); Valois-Dunois (illegitimate); Valois-Anjou; Valois-Burgundy; Valois-Alençon

The Capetian House of Valois (Note: Valois meaning, literally, "of/from the valley".) (also US: /vælˈwɑː, vɑːlˈwɑː/, French: [valwa]) was a cadet branch of the Capetian dynasty. They succeeded the House of Capet (or "Direct Capetians") to the French throne, and were the royal house of France from 1328 to 1589. Junior members of the family founded cadet branches in Orléans, Anjou, Burgundy, and Alençon.

The Valois descended from Charles, Count of Valois (1270–1325), the second surviving son of King Philip III of France (reigned 1270–1285). Their title to the throne was based on a precedent in 1316 (later retroactively attributed to the Merovingian Salic law) which excluded females (Joan II of Navarre), as well as male descendants through the distaff side (Edward III of England), from the succession to the French throne.

After holding the throne for several centuries the Valois male line became extinct and the House of Bourbon succeeded the Valois to the throne as the senior surviving branch of the Capetian dynasty.

== Unexpected inheritance ==
The Capetian dynasty seemed secure in the rule of the Kingdom of France both during and after the reign of King Philip IV (Philip the Fair, r. 1285–1313). Philip left three surviving sons (Louis, Philip and Charles) and a daughter (Isabella). Each son became king in turn, but each died young without surviving male heirs, leaving only daughters who could not inherit the throne. When Charles IV died in 1328 the French succession became more problematic.

In 1328 three candidates had a plausible claim to the French throne:

1. Philip, Count of Valois, son of Charles of Valois, who was the closest heir in male line and a grandson of Philip III (r. 1270–1285). Because his father was the brother of the late Philip IV, the Count of Valois was therefore a nephew of Philip IV and the cousin of Louis X, Philip V and Charles IV. Further, Charles IV had chosen him as the regent before his death.
2. Joan of Navarre, daughter of Louis X. Although Philip V had used his position relative to his niece to take the throne in 1316, Joan nevertheless had a strong claim as the heir-general of Philip IV, and her maternal family had initially supported her claim after the death of Louis X. She ultimately received the Kingdom of Navarre, which could be passed to female heirs.
3. Edward III of England, son of Isabella of France, the daughter and only surviving child of Philip IV. Edward claimed the French throne as a grandson of Philip IV.

In England, Isabella of France claimed the throne on behalf of her 15-year-old son. In contrast to France it was unclear whether a woman could inherit the English crown but English precedent allowed succession through the female line (as exemplified by Henry II of England, son of Matilda). The French rejected Isabella's claim, arguing that since she herself, as a woman, could not succeed, then she could not transmit any such right to her son. Thus the French magnates chose as their new monarch Philip of Valois (Philip VI).

Because diplomacy and negotiation had failed, Edward III would have to back his claims with force to obtain the French throne. For a few years, England and France maintained an uneasy peace. Eventually, an escalation of conflict between the two kings led to King Philip VI confiscating the Duchy of Aquitaine (1337). Instead of paying homage for Aquitaine to the French king, as his ancestors had done, Edward claimed that he himself was the rightful King of France. These events helped launch the Hundred Years' War (1337–1453) between England and France. Though England ultimately failed to win that prolonged conflict, English and British monarchs until 1801 continued to maintain, at least formally, a claim to the French throne.

== Hundred Years' War ==
The Hundred Years' War could be considered a lengthy war of succession between the houses of Valois and Plantagenet. The early reign of Philip VI was a promising one for France. The new king fought the Flemings on behalf of his vassal, the Count of Flanders, and restored that Count to power. Edward III's aggression against Scotland, a French ally, prompted Philip VI to confiscate Guyenne. In the past the English kings would have to submit to the King of France. But Edward, having descended from the French kings, claimed the throne for himself. France was then at the height of its power. No one believed that the English king could make good his claim to France.

Edward's initial strategy was to ally with Flanders and the princes of the Empire. The alliances were costly and not very productive. While on a truce the French and English kings intervened in the War of the Breton Succession. In 1346, Edward invaded France and pillaged the countryside rather than attempt to hold territory. French forces led by Philip VI confronted Edward III at the Battle of Crécy, which resulted in a devastating and humiliating defeat for the French. Despite this, the most that Edward could make out of his victory was the capture of Calais.

John II succeeded his father Philip VI in 1350. He was menaced by Charles II of Navarre, of the Évreux branch of the Capetian family, who aspired to the French throne by the right of his mother, the senior descendant of Philip IV of France. Charles' character eventually alienated both the French and English monarchs, because he readily switched sides whenever it suited his interests. In 1356, Edward, the Black Prince, eldest son and heir of Edward III, led an army to a chevauchée in France. John pursued the Black Prince, who tried to avoid battling the French king's superior force. Negotiations broke down. In the Battle of Poitiers, the French suffered another humiliating defeat, and their king was captured. Edward hoped to capitalize on the victory by invading France and having himself crowned at Reims. But the new leader, the Dauphin Charles, avoided another pitched battle, and the city of Reims withstood siege. In the Treaty of Brétigny, the English king gained an enlarged Aquitaine in full sovereignty, gave up the duchy of Touraine, the counties of Anjou and Maine, the suzerainty of Brittany and of Flanders, and his claim to the French throne.

Charles V became king in 1364. He supported Henry of Trastámara in the Castilian Civil War, while the Black Prince supported the reigning king, Peter of Castile. The Black Prince won, but Peter refused to pay for his expenses. The Black Prince tried to recover his losses by raising taxes in Aquitaine, which prompted them to appeal to the King of France. War was renewed. The French recovered their territories, place after place. When Charles died in 1380, only Calais, Bordeaux and Bayonne were left to the English.

The ancient, great families of the feudal nobility had largely been replaced by an equally powerful class – the princes of the royal blood. With the confiscation of Guyenne, the only remaining non-Capetian peer was the Count of Flanders. The Montfort dukes of Brittany, the houses of Évreux and Bourbon, and the princes of the House of Valois, constituted the great nobility of the kingdom.

Succeeding to the throne at the age of 11, the reign of Charles VI of France was the first minority since that of Saint Louis' in 1226. Power devolved into the hands of his uncles, the dukes of Anjou, Berry and Burgundy. The dukes squandered the resources of the monarchy to pursue their own ends. Anjou pursued his claim in the Kingdom of Naples; Berry governed his large estates in Languedoc; and Burgundy, having married the heiress of Flanders, found it more convenient to rule his vast dominions from Paris. Charles terminated his uncles' regency at the age of 21, even though he would have been entitled to it as early as the age of 14. His early reign was promising, but the onset of madness, which he may have inherited from the Bourbon dukes through his mother, would prove to be disastrous for France. Burgundy, the most powerful of the princes and peers, took power in his hands. But his nephew, Louis I, Duke of Orléans, the king's brother, contested his authority. Rivalry between the two princes and their descendants led to the Armagnac–Burgundian Civil War.

In 1415 Henry V of England, great-grandson of Edward III, invaded France. In the Battle of Agincourt, the Armagnac faction fought the English and was decimated. The dukes of Orléans and Bourbon were captured, and the Burgundian party gained ascendancy in Paris. Henry proceeded to conquer Normandy. The Armagnacs assassinated John the Fearless, duke of Burgundy, a belated revenge for the assassination of Louis I, Duke of Orléans. The new duke, Philip the Good, allied himself with the English. In the Treaty of Troyes, Henry V of England became regent of France and heir to that throne; he also married Catherine of Valois, the French king's daughter. The Dauphin Charles was effectively disinherited. To assume a greater appearance of legality, it was ratified by the Estates General later that year.

To accept the Treaty of Troyes would be a denial of the legitimacy of the Valois. While England was accustomed to changing her kings, the French largely adhered to theirs. The treaty was recognized only in English-controlled territories in northern France, and by the allied dukes of Burgundy and Brittany. Henry V died before his sickly father-in-law, Charles VI, leaving the future of the Lancastrian Kingdom of France in the hands of his infant son Henry VI of England, and his brother, John, Duke of Bedford.

The able leadership of Bedford prevented Charles VII from retaking control of northern France. In 1429, Joan of Arc successfully raised the siege of Orléans and had the king crowned at Reims, an important French propaganda victory. Power struggles between Bedford, his brother Humphrey, Duke of Gloucester, and their uncle Cardinal Beaufort hampered the English war effort. The Duke of Burgundy, alienated by the blunders of Gloucester, reconciled with the King of France in the Treaty of Arras, 1435. Bedford died that same year.

The warring parties arranged long truces, during which the French king prepared for the renewal of war, in contrast the English relaxed and took a break from fresh taxes. By 1450, the French had reconquered Normandy, and Guyenne the next year. A final English attempt to recover their losses ended in decisive defeat at the Battle of Castillon, 1453. With this victory, the English had been expelled in all of France except Calais. The Valois succession was upheld and confirmed.

Royal families involved in the Hundred Years' War (1337–1453)

Valois (Capet)	Plantagenet	Blois	Capet	Évreux (Capet)
Charles; Count of Valois	Edward I "Longshanks"; King of England r. 1272–1307	Joan I Queen of Navarre r. 1274–1305	Philip IV "the Fair"; King of France r. 1285–1314; Philip I King of Navarre r. 1284–1305	Louis; Count of Évreux
Edward II; King of England r. 1307–1327	Isabella "She-Wolf of France"	Louis X King of France r. 1314–1316; Louis I King of Navarre r. 1305–1316	Philip V "the Tall"; King of France; Philip II; King of Navarre r. 1316–1322	Charles IV "the Fair"; King of France; Charles I "the Bald"; King of Navarre r. 1322–1328	Joan of Évreux
Philip VI "the Fortunate" "of Valois"; King of France r. 1328–1350	Joan of Valois	John I "the Posthumous"; King of France; King of Navarre r. 1316	Joan II; Queen of Navarre r. 1328–1349	Philip III "the Noble" "the Wise"; King of Navarre jure uxoris r. 1328–1343
John II "the Good"; King of France r. 1350–1364	Philippa of Hainault	Edward III; King of England r. 1327–1377	Joan of the Tower	David II; King of Scotland r. 1329–1371	Charles II "the Bad"; King of Navarre r. 1349–1387
Charles V "the Wise"; King of France r. 1364–1380	Philip the Bold; Duke of Burgundy	Edward of Woodstock "The Black Prince"	John of Gaunt	Edmund of Langley; Duke of York
Luxembourg
Charles VI "the Beloved" "the Mad"; King of France r. 1380–1422	Louis I Duke of Orléans	Charles IV; Holy Roman Emperor r. 1355–1378	Henry IV; King of England r. 1399–1413
Charles VII "the Victorious"; King of France r. 1422–1461	Isabella of Valois	Richard II; King of England r. 1377–1399	Anne of Bohemia	Catherine of Valois	Henry V King of England r. 1413–1422	Thomas of Lancaster; Duke of Clarence †Battle of Baugé
Henry VI; King of England r. 1422–1461, r. 1470–1471

== Centralization of power ==
With the expulsion of the English, Charles VII had reestablished his kingdom as the foremost power of Western Europe. He created France's first standing army since Roman times, and limited papal power in the Gallican Church by the Pragmatic Sanction of Bourges. But his later years were marred by quarrels with his eldest son and heir, the Dauphin Louis, who refused to obey him. The dauphin was banished from court for his intrigues, and did not return to France until his father's death.

Louis XI succeeded his father in 1461. At the beginning of his reign Louis reversed his father's policies, abolishing the Pragmatic Sanction to please the pope and the standing armies, which he distrusted, in favor of Swiss mercenaries. As a prince he had leagued with the nobility against his father, but as a king he found that his power could only be maintained by subduing them. He was the lifelong enemy of Charles the Bold, Count of Charolais, and later Duke of Burgundy. In 1465, the League of the Public Weal, an alliance of the feudal princes, which consisted of Charles, Duke of Berry, the king's brother, the Count of Charolais, the Dukes of Brittany, Bourbon, Lorraine (then a member of the House of Anjou), and several others, attempted to restore their feudal prerogatives. Louis feared a further escalation of the conflict against this formidable coalition. To obtain peace he conceded all their demands, including the Duchy of Normandy to his brother, which carried with it one-third of the offices of state.

Louis seldom relied on the fortunes of war, but rather on intrigue and diplomacy. He maintained his power by paying pensions to well-placed people in the courts of his vassals and in neighboring states. He retook Normandy from his brother at the first opportunity. He bought off Edward IV of England to desist from attacking France. He fomented rebellions in the Burgundian dominions. At the death of Charles the Bold in 1477, he seized the duchy of Burgundy, which he claimed as a reverted fief, even though the original grant did not specify the exclusion of female heirs. But the marriage of Mary of Burgundy, heiress of Charles the Bold, to Maximilian of Austria would prove problematic for later generations. In 1481, the last male of the House of Anjou died, willing all the Angevin possessions to the king. At the end of his reign royal power had become absolute in France.

== Italian Wars ==
Charles VIII succeeded his father in 1483, at the age of 13. During his minority the nobles again attempted to seize power, but they were defeated by Charles' sister Anne of France. Charles' marriage to Anne of Brittany prevented a future total Habsburg encirclement of France.

As the heir of the House of Anjou, Charles VIII decided to press his claim to the Kingdom of Naples. It was the beginning of the Italian Wars. In September 1494 Charles invaded Italy with 25,000 men, and attained his object by 22 February 1495, virtually unopposed. But the speed and power of the French advance frightened the powers of Italy. The League of Venice, which consisted of the Republics of Venice and Florence, the Duchies of Milan and Mantua, the Kings of Spain and Naples, the Emperor and the Pope, united against the French. Charles, who did not wish to be trapped in Naples, had to fight against them in the Battle of Fornovo. Charles succeeded in returning to France, but all his conquests and booty were lost. The debts he incurred for the campaign prevented him from resuming the war, and he died in an accident in 1498. With his death the senior line of the House of Valois became extinct. He was succeeded by his cousin, the Duke of Orleans, who became Louis XII.

Louis XII married his predecessor's widow, Anne of Brittany, in order to retain that province for France. The new king also continued his predecessor's policy in Italy. The Dukes of Orleans were descended from Valentina Visconti, and through her claimed the Duchy of Milan. From 1499 to 1512, excepting a brief period in 1500, Louis XII was Duke of Milan. French military activity continued in Italy, with various leagues formed to counter the dominant power. Louis died without a son, and was succeeded by his cousin and son-in-law, Francis of Angoulême, who became Francis I of France in 1515.

Francis I belonged to a cadet branch of the House of Orleans. In the Battle of Marignano, Francis defeated the Swiss, who had ousted his predecessor from Milan, and took control of the duchy. In the Imperial Election of 1519, the Kings of Spain, France, and England fought for the imperial title. The King of Spain was a grandson of the deceased emperor, but the electors thought him to be a foreigner as much as the French king. The kings resorted to bribes, and the Spanish king became Charles V, Holy Roman Emperor.

The election of the Spanish king to the imperial throne made him the first monarch in Europe, both in title and in reality. Annoyed, the French king demanded that the emperor pay homage for Flanders and Artois; the emperor responded by reasserting his claim to the duchy of Burgundy. The rivalry of the French royal house with the Habsburgs dominated the rest of the sixteenth century. The emperor took Milan from the French in 1521. The King of England and the pope supported the emperor. France was surrounded by enemies on all sides. Domestic troubles led to the defection of Charles III, Duke of Bourbon and Constable of France, to the emperor. In 1525, at the Battle of Pavia, the French were defeated and the king himself was captured. Francis obtained his release through the Treaty of Madrid, in which he renounced claims in Naples and Milan, surrendered Burgundy to Spain, abandoned sovereignty over Flanders and Artois, and gave up two of his sons as hostages. Francis repudiated the treaty. Having often found himself alone in his struggle against the emperor, Francis formed the Franco-Ottoman alliance with the sultan, to the scandal of Christian Europe. Francis supported the conversion of the German princes to Protestantism, as it increased his potential allies against the emperor. In his own dominions, the Protestants were suppressed.

Henry II succeeded to the throne in 1547. He continued his father's policies, as did his successors. He persecuted Protestants in his kingdom, while Protestants abroad were his allies. Henry captured the three bishoprics of Metz, Toul, and Verdun. French offensives failed in Italy. In 1556, Charles V abdicated, splitting the Habsburg dominions between his son, Philip II of Spain, who gained Spain and the Low Countries, and his brother Ferdinand I, who became emperor. The French retook Calais after England allied with Spain. The Peace of Cateau-Cambrésis (1559) ended the Italian Wars. The French lost all their Italian territories except Saluzzo, and were confirmed in the possession of Calais and the three bishoprics. It was a diplomatic victory for Philip II, who gave up nothing which belonged to himself. The Spanish king retained Franche-Comté and was confirmed in his possession of Milan, Naples, Sicily, Sardinia, and the State of Presidi, making him the most powerful ruler in Italy.

== French Wars of Religion ==
The last phase of Valois rule in France was marked by the French Wars of Religion. Henry II died in a jousting accident in 1559. His eldest son and heir, Francis II, succeeded him. The new king was already King of Scotland by right of his wife, Mary, Queen of Scots. The queen's maternal relatives, the House of Guise, gained an ascendancy over the young king.

The House of Guise was a cadet branch of the ducal House of Lorraine. They claimed descent from Charlemagne and had designs on the French throne. They considered the House of Bourbon, princes of the blood, as their natural enemies. The leading Bourbons, the brothers Antoine, King of Navarre, and Louis, Prince of Condé, were Protestants. The House of Guise identified themselves as champions of the Catholic cause. They were on the point of executing Condé when the young king died.

With the succession of her minor son Charles IX in 1560, Catherine de' Medici maneuvered for a balance of power. She released Condé, hoping to use the Bourbons as a counterweight against the Guises. Antoine of Navarre converted to Catholicism and became Lieutenant-General of the Kingdom. The Massacre of Vassy sparked the "first" religious war between the Catholics and the Huguenots. Navarre and Guise died in this war. Anne de Montmorency, Constable of France, was the notable casualty of the second war. Condé died in the third war. The Huguenots were unable to win a substantive victory, but were able to keep an army in the field.

Henry, King of Navarre, married Margaret of France, sister of Charles IX, in 1572. The marriage, which had been expected to reconcile the Protestants and Catholics, proved to be a disappointment. The St. Bartholomew's Day massacre ensued; the Huguenots who flocked in Paris for the wedding were massacred en masse. Navarre and Condé were spared, forced to convert, and detained. The guilt of having permitted the massacre would haunt Charles for the rest of his life. In 1573, the king's brother, Henry, Duke of Anjou, was elected King of Poland.

In 1574, only three months after Henry's coronation as King of Poland, he succeeded to the French throne as Henry III. The next year the king's only remaining brother, the Duke of Alençon, fled the court and joined with Condé and Navarre. This combined threat forced the new king to grant the demands of the rebels. Alençon was made Duke of Anjou. The concessions to the Huguenots disquieted the Catholics, who formed the Catholic League. The League was led by the princes of the House of Lorraine – the dukes of Guise, Mayenne, Aumale, Elboeuf, Mercœur and Lorraine, supported by Spain. The Huguenots held the southwest and were allied to England and the princes of Germany. The death of the king's brother, in 1584, meant that the Huguenot King of Navarre had become heir presumptive to the throne of France. Pressured by the Catholic League, the king issued the Treaty of Nemours, which outlawed Protestantism and made Protestants incapable of holding royal office.

In the resulting War of the Three Henrys, the royalists led by the king, the Huguenots led by Henry of Navarre, and the Catholic League led by Henry of Guise, fought a three-way contest for the control of France. After the humiliation of the Day of the Barricades, Henry III fled from Paris. Guise had entered Paris against his express prohibition; he resolved to assassinate the audacious duke. The assassination of Guise drew the odium of the Catholic League. Henry III sought the alliance of Navarre. The two kings were on the point of taking Paris with their great army, when the French king fell by the hands of an assassin. With his death the male line of the House of Valois had been completely extinguished, after reigning for 261 years in France.

== Succession ==
The royal Bourbons originated in 1272, when the youngest son of King Louis IX married the heiress of the lordship of Bourbon. The house continued for three centuries as a cadet branch, serving as nobles under the Direct Capetian and Valois kings.

In 1589, at the death of Henry III of France, the House of Valois became extinct in the male line. Under the Salic law, the Head of the House of Bourbon, as the senior representative of the senior-surviving branch of the Capetian dynasty, became King of France as Henry IV.

== List of Valois kings of France ==
=== Valois (direct) ===
- Philip VI, the Fortunate 1328–1350, son of Charles of Valois
- John II, the Good 1350–1364
- Charles V, the Wise 1364–1380
- Charles VI, the Well-Beloved, later known as the Mad 1380–1422
- Charles VII, the Victorious or the Well-Served 1422–1461
- Louis XI, the Prudent 1461–1483
- Charles VIII, the Affable 1483–1498

=== Valois-Orléans ===
- Louis XII, the Father of the People 1498–1515, great-grandson of Charles V of France

=== Valois-Angoulême ===
- Francis I – 1515–1547, great-great-grandson of Charles V of France
- Henry II – 1547–1559
- Francis II – 1559–1560
- Charles IX – 1560–1574
- Henry III – 1574–1589

The application of the Salic Law meant that with the extinction of the Valois in the male line, the Bourbons succeeded to the throne as descendants of Louis IX.

== Valois king of Polish–Lithuanian Commonwealth ==
- Henry III of France – 1573–1574

== Other significant titles held by the House of Valois ==
=== Count of Valois ===
House of Valois

- Charles, count (1284–1325)

=== Latin Emperor of Constantinople ===
House of Valois

- Charles, titular emperor suo uxoris (1301–1307) (see Charles of Valois above)

House of Valois–Courtenay

- Catherine II, Latin Empress, titular empress (1307–1346), daughter of Charles of Valois

=== Counts and Dukes of Alençon ===
House of Valois

- Charles I, count (1291–1325) (see Charles of Valois, above)

House of Valois-Alençon

- Charles II, count (1325–1346), second son of Charles of Valois
- Charles III, count (1346–1361)
- Peter II, count (1361–1391)
- John I, count (1391–1414)
- John I, duke (1414–1415)
- John II, duke (1415–1424 and 1449–1474)
- René I, duke (1478–1492)
- Charles IV, duke (1492–1525)

House of França (Portugal)

=== Counts and Dukes of Anjou ===
House of Valois-Anjou

- Louis I, duke (1360–1383) (also king of Jerusalem and Naples as Louis I), second son of John II of France
- Louis II (1377–1417), son of (also king of Naples as Louis II)
- Louis III (1403–1434), son of (also king of Naples as Louis III)
- René I (1409–1480), brother of (also king of Jerusalem and Naples as René I)
- Charles IV (1436–1481), nephew of (also king of Jerusalem and Naples as Charles IV)

=== Dukes of Burgundy ===
House of Valois-Burgundy

- Philip II the Bold (1363–1404), fourth son of John II of France
- John I the Fearless (1404–1419)
- Philip III the Good (1419–1467)
- Charles I the Bold (1467–1477)
- Mary I the Rich (1477–1482)

==== Dukes of Brabant ====
House of Valois-Burgundy-Brabant

- Anthony I (1406–1415), second son of Philip the Bold of Burgundy
- John IV (1415–1427)
- Philip I (1427–1430)

==== Counts of Nevers ====
House of Valois-Burgundy-Nevers

- Philip II (1404–1415), third son of Philip the Bold of Burgundy
- Charles I (1415–1464)
- John II (1464–1491)

=== Dukes of Orléans ===
House of Valois

- Philip, Duke of Orléans (1344–1375)

House of Valois-Orléans

- Louis I, Duke of Orléans (1392–1407), younger son of Charles V of France
- Charles I, Duke of Orléans (1407–1465)
- Louis II, Duke of Orléans (1465–1515), later also King of France as Louis XII

=== Duke of Brittany ===
House of Valois–Orléans

- Claude, duchess (1514–1524), daughter of Louis XII of France and Anne of Brittany

House of Valois-Orléans-Angoulême

- Francis III, Duke of Brittany, duke (1524–1536), son of Claude of Brittany
- Henry, duke (1536–1547), brother of Francis III, later also King of France as Henry II

==== Counts of Angoulême ====
House of Valois-Orléans-Angoulême

- John, Count of Angoulême (1399–1467), a younger son of Louis I, Duke of Orléans
- Charles, Count of Angoulême (1459–1496)
- Francis, Count of Angoulême (1494–1547), later also King of France as Francis I

== Illegitimate branches ==
- House of Valois-Dunois, counts of Longueville (see Jean de Dunois), descended from a son of Louis I, Duke of Orléans
- House of Valois-Saint-Remy, counts of Saint-Rémy (see Jeanne of Valois-Saint-Rémy), descended from a son of Henry II of France

== Forms of address ==
Forms of address for Valois kings and princes included "Most Christian Majesty", "Dauphin", "your Grace", "Your Majesty", "Most regal Majesty".

== Family tree ==
Unlike in some other family trees, siblings here are not listed in birth order.

- : The blue border indicates French monarchs.
- : The thin border indicates other relatives.

1

Philip III; 1245-1285; King of France r. 1270–1285
Valois
Charles I and III; 1270-1325; Count of Valois r. 1284–1325; Count of Alençon r. 1291–1325
Valois-Countenay	Valois-Alençon
Philip VI; 1293-1350; King of France r. 1328–1350	Catherine II; 1303-1346; Latin Empress of Constantinople r. 1307–1346	Charles II; 1297-1346; Count of Alençon r. 1325–1346
John II; 1319-1364; King of France r. 1350–1364	Phillp; 1336-1376; Duke of Orléans r. 1347–1375	Charles III; 1339-1375; Count of Alençon r. 1346–1361	Peter II; 1340-1404; Count of Alençon r. 1361–1391
Valois-Anjou	Valois-Burgundy
Charles V 1338-1380; King of France r. 1364–1380	Louis I 1339-1384; Count of Anjou r. 1356–1360; Duke of Anjou r. 1360–1384	Philip II; 1342-1404; Duke of Burgundy r. 1363–1404	John I 1385-1415; Count of Alençon r. 1391–1414; Duke of Alençon r. 1414–1415
Valois-Orléans	Valois-Burgundy-Brabant	Valois-Burgundy-Nevers
Charles VI; 1368-1422; King of France r. 1380–1422	Louis I 1372-1407; Duke of Orléans r. 1392–1407	Louis II; 1377-1417; Duke of Anjou r. 1384–1417	John I 1371-1419; Duke of Burgundy r. 1404–1419	Anthony I 1384-1415; Duke of Brabant r. 1406–1415	Philp II; 1389-1415; Count of Nevers r. 1404–1415	John II; 1409-1476; Duke of Alençon r. 1415–1424 r. 1449–1474
Valois-Orléans-Angoulême
Charles VII; 1403-1461; King of France r. 1422–1461	Marie; 1404-1463; Queen of France r. 1422–1461	John; 1394-1467; Count of Angoulême	Louis III; 1403-1434; Duke of Anjou r. 1417–1434	Philp III; 1396-1467; Duke of Burgundy r. 1419–1467	René I 1409-1480; Duke of Anjou r. 1434–1480	Charles IV; 1414-1472; Count of Maine r. 1441–1472	Philip I 1404-1430; Duke of Brabant r. 1427–1430	John II; 1415-1491; Count of Nevers r. 1464–1491	John IV; 1403-1427; Duke of Brabant r. 1415–1427	Charles I 1414-1464; Count of Nevers r. 1415–1464
Louis XI; 1423-1483; King of France r. 1461–1483	Charles I 1394-1465; Duke of Orléans r. 1407–1465	Charles; 1459-1496; Count of Angoulême r. 1467–1496	Yolande; 1428-1483; Duchess of Lorrine r. 1473–1483
Joan; 1464-1505; Queen of France r. 1498	Louis II and XII; 1462-1515; Duke of Orléans r. 1465–1498 King of France r. 1498–1515	Charles I 1433-1477; Duke of Burgundy r. 1467–1477	Charles IV; 1446-1481; Duke of Anjou r. 1480–1481	Margaret; 1463-1521; Duchess of Alençon r. 1488–1525	René I 1454-1492; Duke of Alençon r. 1478–1492
Charles VIII; 1470-1498; King of France r. 1483–1498	Claude; 1499-1524; Duchess of Brittany r. 1514–1524	Francis I 1494-1547; King of France r. 1515–1547	Mary I 1457-1482; Duke of Burgundy r. 1477–1482	Marguerite; 1492-1549; Queen consort of Navarre r. 1527–1549	Charles IV; 1489-1535; Duke of Alençon r. 1492–1535
Charles II; 1522-1545; Duke of Orléans r. 1536–1545	Henry I and II; 1519-1559; Duke of Orléans r. 1519–1536; King of France r. 1547–1559	Francis III; 1518-1536; Duke of Brittany r. 1524–1536
Francis II; 1544-1560; King of France r. 1559–1560	Charles III; And IX; 1550-1574; Duke of Orléans r. 1550–1560; King of France r. 1560–1574	Henry II and III; 1551-1589; Duke of Orléans r. 1560–1566; King of France r. 1574–1589	Louis III; 1449-1450; Duke of Orléans r. 1449–1450

== See also ==
- Ancien Régime
- France in the Middle Ages
- Early modern France
- French monarchs family tree
- Valois Tapestries

== Notes ==
*Royal House* House of Valois Cadet branch of the Capetian dynasty
Preceded by House of Capet	Ruling House of France; 1328–1589	Succeeded by House of Bourbon
Preceded by Capetian House of Burgundy	Ruling House of the Duchy of Burgundy; 1363–1482	Succeeded by House of Habsburg
