= Louis I, Duke of Orléans =

French prince and nobleman (1372–1407)

Louis I
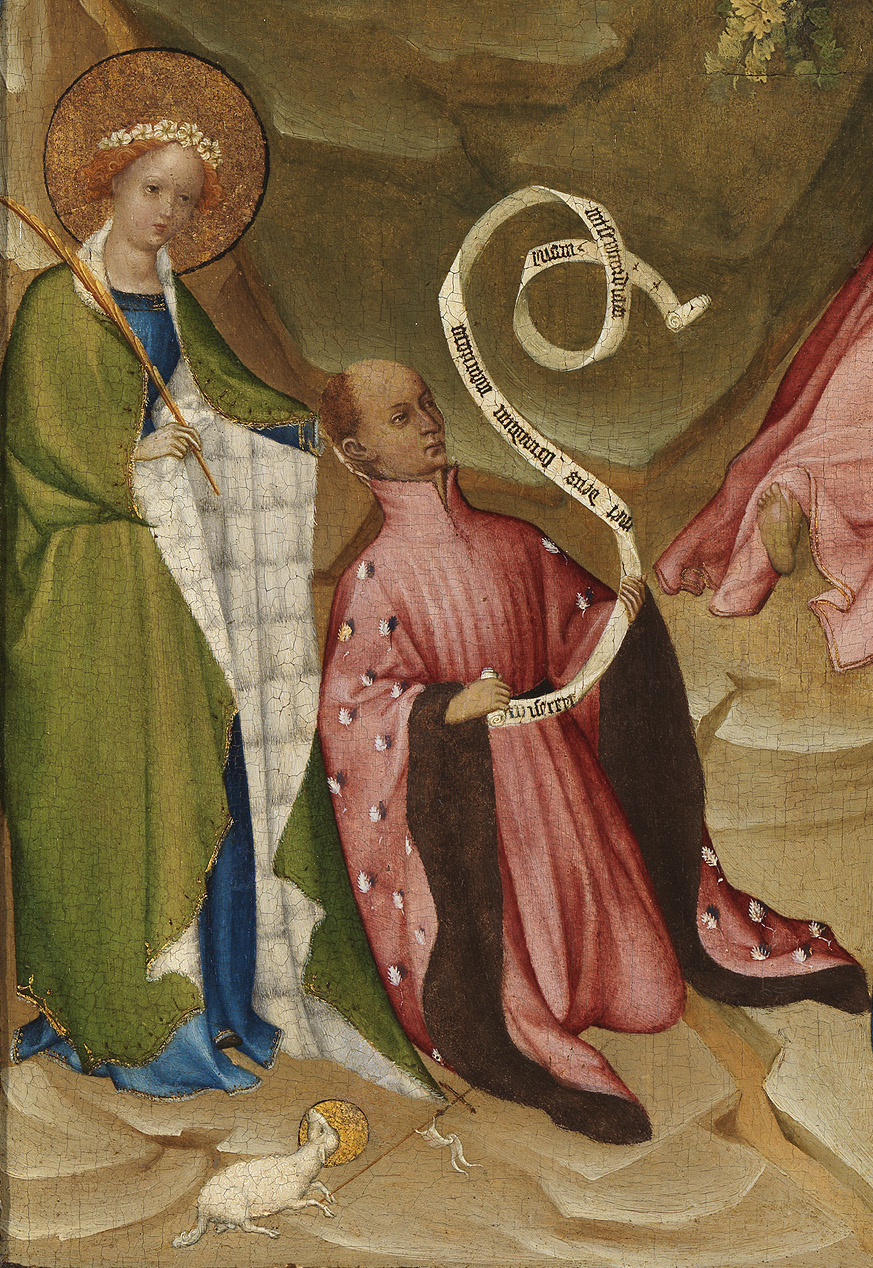
- Louis I of Orléans with Saint Agnes, detail of the Agony in the Garden attributed to Colart de Laon, c. 1405–1408
Duke of Orléans and Valois
- ----
  Count of Asti	1389–1407
  Count of Vertus (jure uxoris)	1389–1407
  Count of Angoulême	1394–1407
  Count of Blois	1397–1407
  Count of Périgord	1400–1407
  Count of Dreux	1402–1407
  Count of Chiny	1402–1407
  Duke of Luxembourg	1402–1407
  Count of Soissons	1405–1407
- Tenure: 4 June 1392 – 23 November 1407
- Successor: Charles
- Born: 13 March 1372; Hôtel Saint-Pol, Paris, France
- Died: 23 November 1407 (aged 35); Le Marais, Paris, France
- Burial: Couvent des Célestins, Paris
- Spouse: Valentina Visconti (m. 1389)
- Issue: Charles, Duke of Orléans; Philip, Count of Vertus; John, Count of Angoulême; Margaret, Countess of Vertus; Jean de Dunois (illegitimate)
- House: Valois (by birth); Valois-Orléans (founder)
- Father: Charles V of France
- Mother: Joanna of Bourbon

Louis I (13 March 1372 – 23 November 1407) was Duke of Orléans from 1392 to his death in 1407. He was also Duke of Touraine (1386–1392), Count of Valois (1386?–1406), Blois (1397–1407), Angoulême (1404–1407), Périgord (1400–1407) and Soissons (1404–07).

Louis was the son of King Charles V of France and the younger brother of King Charles VI of France, and a powerful and polarizing figure in his day. Owing to the King's highly public struggles with mental illness, Louis worked with Charles's wife Queen Isabeau of Bavaria to try to lead the kingdom during Charles's frequent bouts of insanity. He struggled for control of France with John the Fearless, Duke of Burgundy. Louis was unpopular with the citizens of Paris due to his reputation for womanizing and his role in the Bal des Ardents tragedy, which resulted in the deaths of four French nobles and the near death of the king himself. He was assassinated in 1407 in Paris on orders of John the Fearless; John not only admitted to his role in the murder, but bragged openly about it. What began as a feud between factions of the royal family erupted into open warfare as a result of Louis's death. Louis's grandson would later become King of France as Louis XII.

== Biography ==
Born on 13 March 1372, Louis was the second son of King Charles V of France and Queen Joanna of Bourbon and was the younger brother of Charles VI.

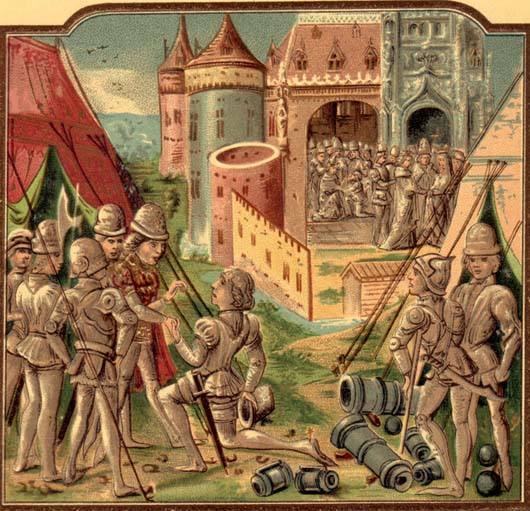
Louis in the camp in front; in the background, Sigismund marries Mary

In 1374, Louis was betrothed to Catherine, heir presumptive to the throne of Hungary. Louis and Catherine were expected to reign either over Hungary or over Poland, as Catherine's father, King Louis I of Hungary, had no sons. Catherine's father also planned to leave them his claim to the Crown of Naples and the County of Provence, which were then held by his ailing and childless cousin Joanna I. However, Catherine's death in 1378 ended the marriage negotiations. In 1384, Elizabeth of Bosnia started negotiating with Louis' father about the possibility of Louis marrying her daughter Mary, notwithstanding Mary's engagement to Sigismund of Luxembourg. If Elizabeth had made this proposal in 1378, after Catherine's death, the fact that the French king and the Hungarian king no longer recognised the same pope would have presented a problem. However, Elizabeth was desperate in 1384 and was not willing to let the schism stand in the way of the negotiations. The Avignonian Antipope Clement VII issued a dispensation which annulled Mary's betrothal to Sigismund and a proxy marriage between Louis and Mary was celebrated in April 1385. Nonetheless, the marriage was not recognised by the Hungarian noblemen who adhered to the Roman Pope Urban VI. Four months after the proxy marriage, Sigismund invaded Hungary and married Mary, which ultimately destroyed Louis' chances to reign as King of Hungary.

=== Role in court and the Hundred Years' War ===
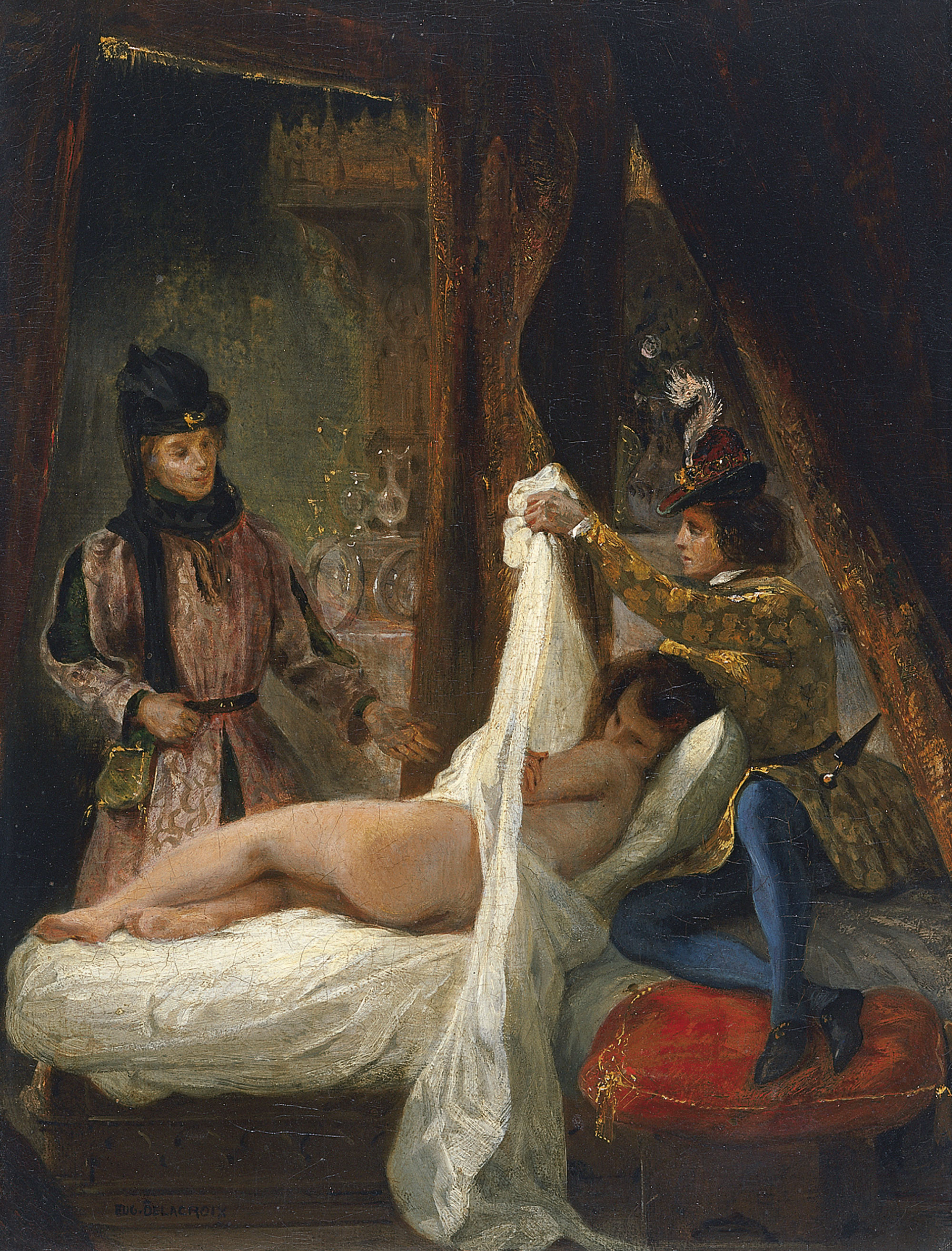
Louis d'Orléans unveils a mistress c.1825–26 (Thyssen-Bornemisza Collection, Madrid) by Eugène Delacroix, illustrating Louis' reputation as a debauchee.

Louis played an important political role during the Hundred Years' War. In 1392, his elder brother King Charles VI the Mad (who may have suffered from either schizophrenia, porphyria, paranoid schizophrenia, or bipolar disorder) experienced the first in a lifelong series of attacks of 'insanity'. It soon became clear that Charles was unable to rule independently. In 1393, a regency council presided over by Queen Isabeau was formed, and Louis gained powerful influence.

Louis disputed the regency and guardianship of the royal children, initially with the Duke of Burgundy Philip the Bold until his death in 1404, and then with Philip's son John the Fearless. The enmity between the two was public and a source of political unrest in the already troubled the country. Louis had the initial advantage over John, being the brother rather than the first cousin of the king, but his reputation as a womanizer and the rumour of an affair with Queen Isabeau made him extremely unpopular in Paris. In the following years, the children of Charles VI were successively kidnapped and recovered by both parties, until John the Fearless was appointed by royal decree as guardian of the Dauphin Louis and regent of France.

Louis did not give up and made every effort to sabotage John's rule, including squandering the money raised for the siege of Calais, then occupied by the English. After this episode, John and Louis broke into open threats and only the intervention of John, Duke of Berry, and uncle of both men, avoided a civil war.

Louis was reportedly responsible for the deaths of four dancers at a disastrous 1393 masquerade ball that became known as the Bal des Ardents (Ball of the Burning Men). The four victims were burnt alive when a torch held by Louis came too close to their highly flammable costumes. Two other dancers wearing the same costumes (one of whom was Charles VI himself) narrowly escaped a similar fate.

== Assassination ==
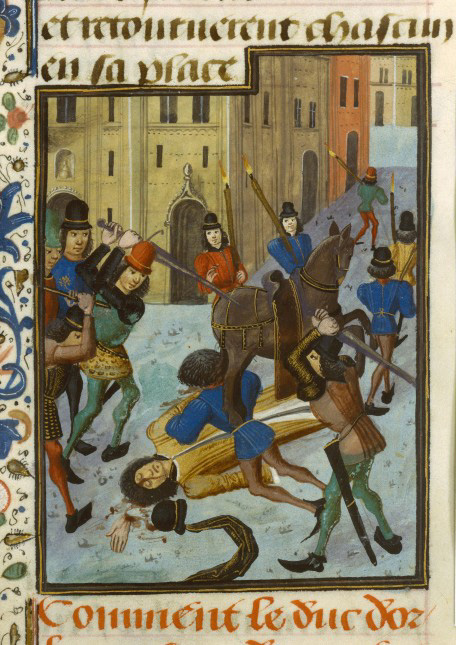
Louis's assassination on the rue Vieille du Temple.

On Sunday, 20 November, 1407, the contending Dukes exchanged solemn vows of reconciliation before the court of France. But only three days later, Louis was brutally assassinated in the streets of Paris, on John's orders. Louis was attacked while riding a mule by fifteen masked criminals led by Raoulet d'Anquetonville, a servant of the Duke of Burgundy. Louis' hand was cut off and his skull split by an axe.

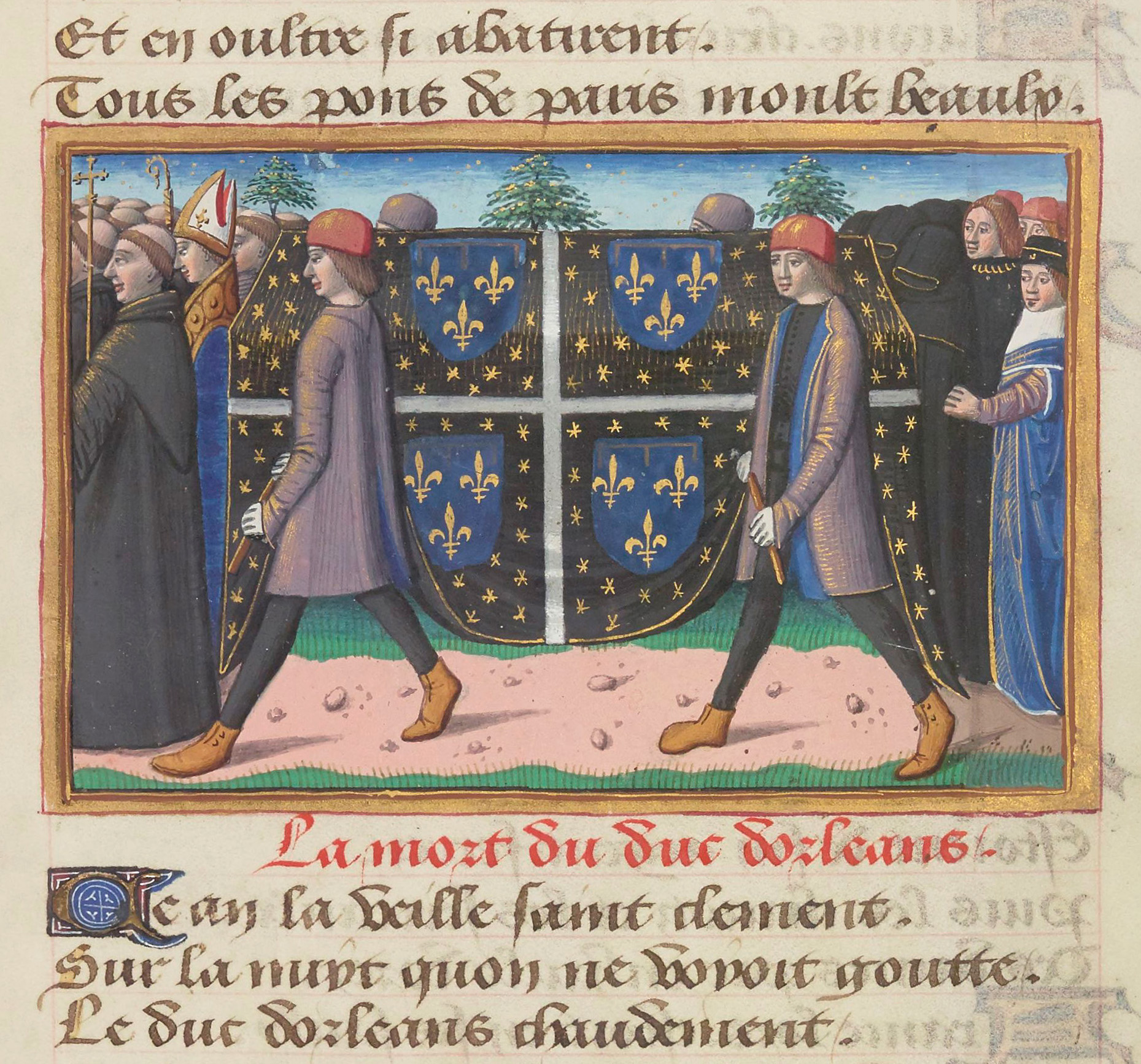
Funeral of Louis. Miniature from Vigiles du roi Charles VII, c. 1484.

John the Fearless was supported by the population of Paris and the University. He could even publicly admit the killing. Rather than deny it, John had the scholar Jean Petit of the Sorbonne deliver a peroration justifying the murder as tyrannicide.

Louis's murder sparked a bloody feud and civil war between Burgundy and the French royal family which divided France for the next twenty-eight years, ending with the Treaty of Arras in 1435.

== Marriage and issue ==
In 1389, Louis married Valentina Visconti, daughter of Gian Galeazzo Visconti, Duke of Milan. They had:

1. A son (born and died Paris, 25 March 1390), buried in Paris, église Saint-Paul.
2. Louis (Paris, Hôtel de Saint-Pol, 26 May 1391 – September 1395), buried in Paris, église des Célestins.
3. John (September 1393 – Château de Vincennes, bef. 31 October 1393), buried in Paris, église des Célestins.
4. Charles I, Duke of Orléans (Hôtel de Saint-Pol, Paris, 24 November 1394 – Château d'Amboise, Indre-et-Loire, 4 January 1465), father of King Louis XII.
5. Philip, Count of Vertus (Asnières-sur-Oise, Val d'Oise, 21/24 July 1396 – Beaugency, Loiret, 1 September 1420). Left a natural son, Philip Anthony, called the Bastard of Vertus, who died about 1445; no issue.
6. John, Count of Angoulême (24 June 1399 – Château de Cognac, Charente, 30 April 1467), grandfather of Francis I of France
7. Marie (Château de Coucy, Aisne, April 1401 – died shortly after birth).
8. Margaret (4 December 1406 – Abbaye de Laguiche, near Blois, 24 April 1466), married Richard of Brittany, Count of Étampes. She received the County of Vertus as a dowry. Ancestors of the Dukes of Brittany and Lords of Chalon-Arlay and Prince of Orange.

By Mariette d'Enghien, his mistress, Louis had an illegitimate son:

1. Jean de Dunois (1402–1468), the bastard of Orléans, ancestor of the Dukes of Longueville
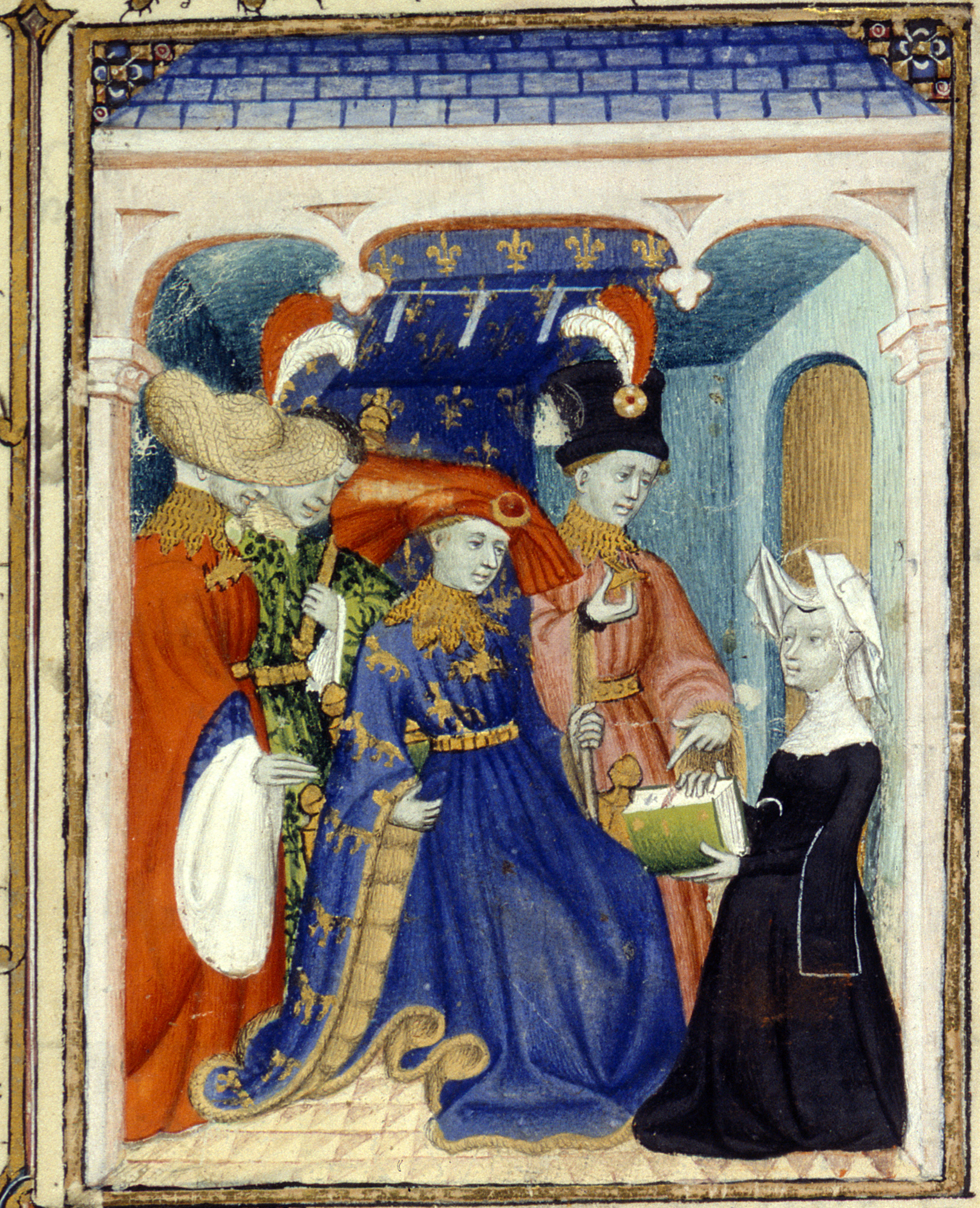
Louis of Orléans meeting Christine de Pisan

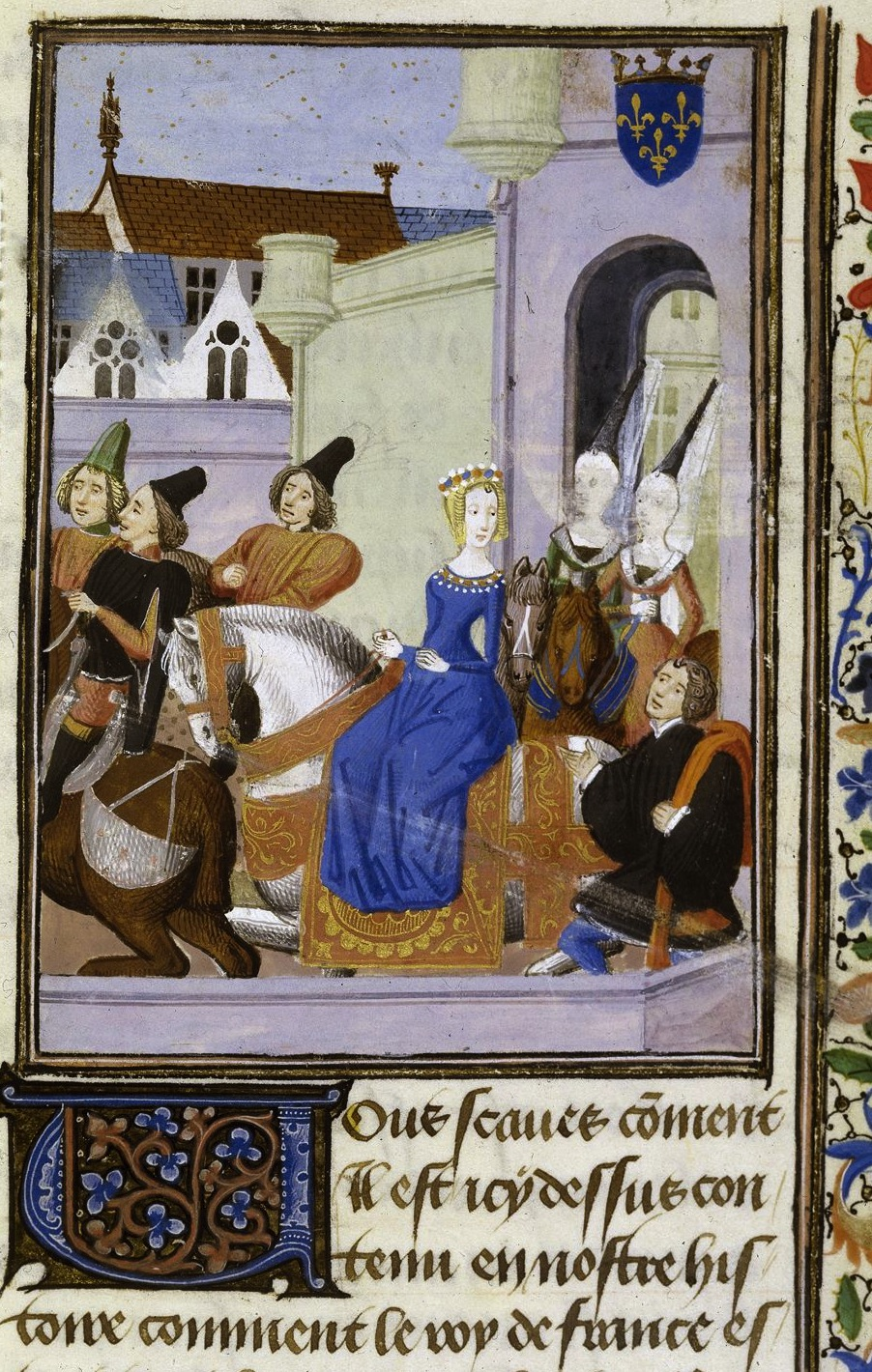
Valentina Visconti, Duchess of Orléans

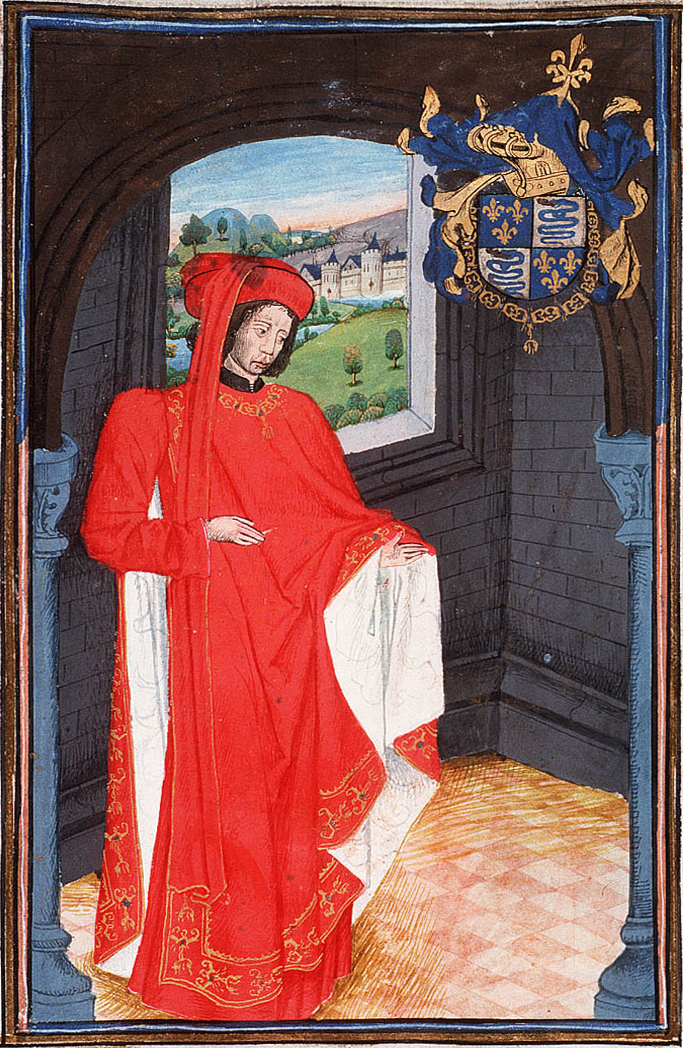
Charles, Duke of Orléans; the coat of arms at upper right combined the coats of arms of his parents-the House of Valois and the House of Visconti

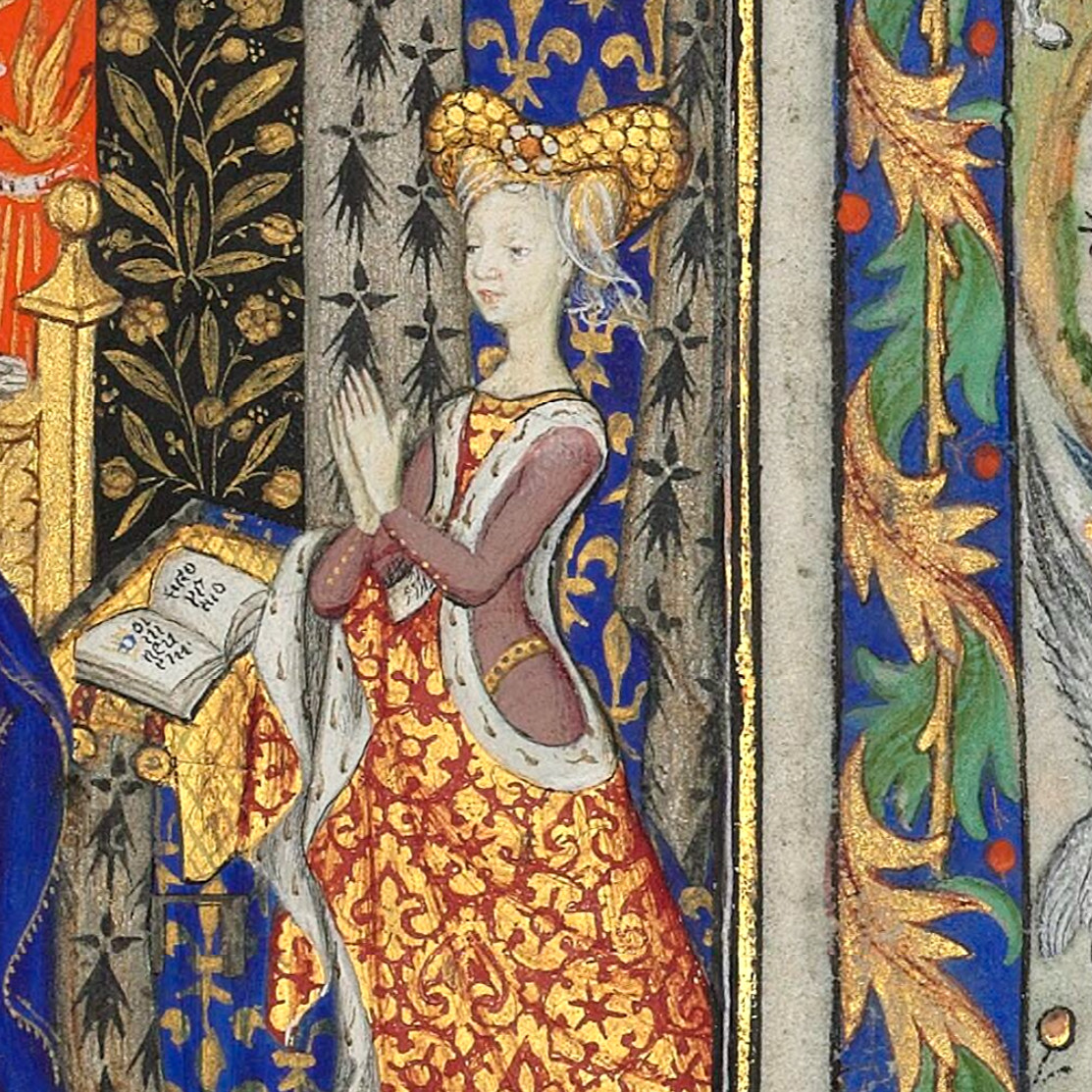
Margaret, Countess of Vertus

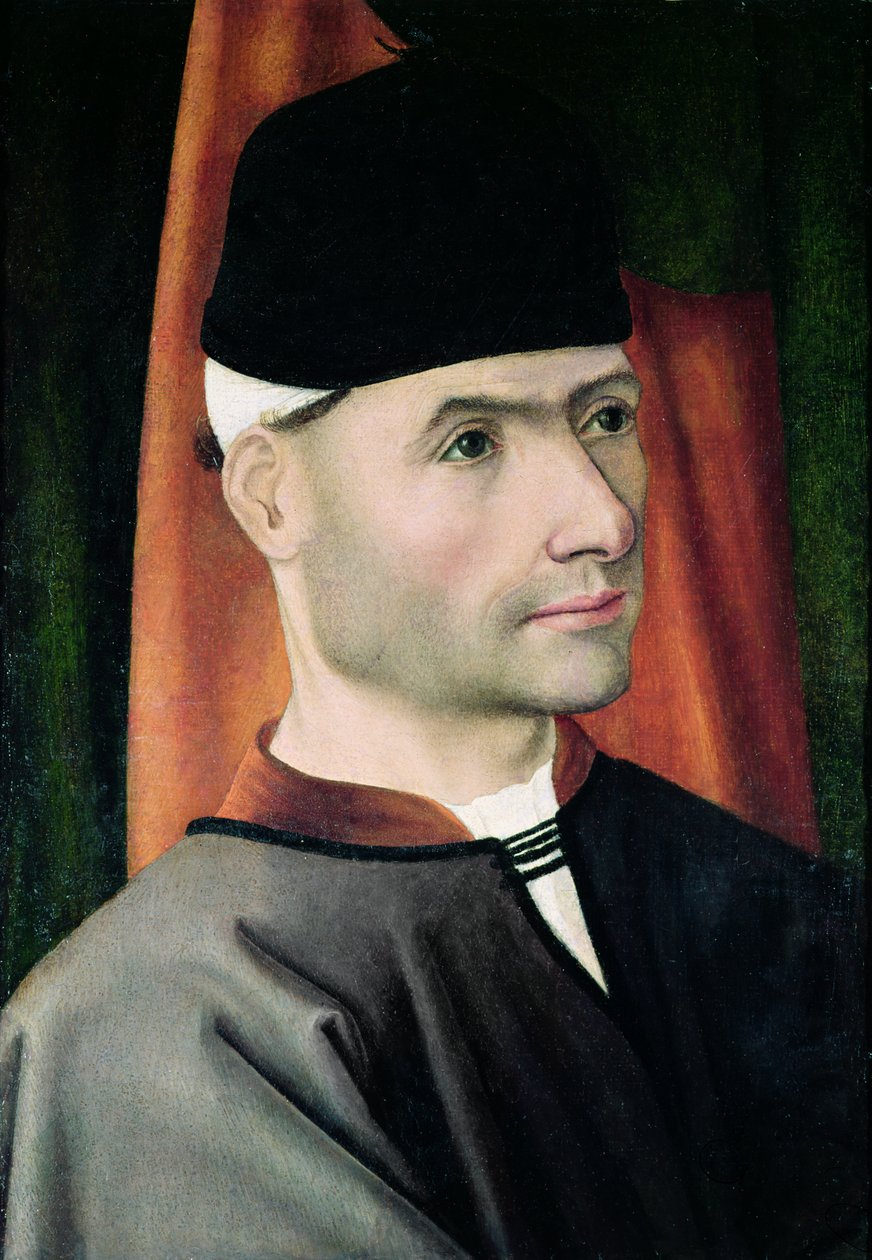
Jean de Dunois, Count of Longueville

== Honours ==
- Kingdom of France - Duchy of Orléans: 1st Grand Master and Knight of the Order of the Porcupine he founded on the occasion of the baptism of his son Charles

== Sources ==
- Adams, Tracy (2010). The Life and Afterlife of Isabeau of Bavaria. Johns Hopkins University Press. ISBN 978-0801896255.
- Hourihane, Colum, ed. (2012). "Valois". The Grove Encyclopedia of Medieval Art and Architecture. Vol. 2. Oxford University Press.
- Engel, Pal; Ayton, Andrew; Pálosfalvi, Tamás (1999). The Realm of St. Stephen: A History of Medieval Hungary, 895–1526. Vol. 19. Penn State Press.
- George, Hereford Brooke (1875). Genealogical Tables Illustrative of Modern History. Oxford Clarendon Press.
- Keane, Marguerite (2016). Material Culture and Queenship in 14th-century France: The Testament of Blanche of Navarre (1331–1398). Brill.
- Parsons, John Carmi (1997). Medieval Queenship. Palgrave Macmillan.
- Potter, David (1995). A History of France, 1460–1560: The Emergence of a Nation State. St. Martin's Press.
- Theis, Laurent (1992). Histoire du Moyen Âge Français. Perrin.
- Ward, A.W.; Prothero, G.W.; Leathes, Stanley, eds. (1934). The Cambridge Modern History. Vol. XIII. Cambridge at the University Press.
- Warnicke, Retha M. (2000). The Marrying of Anne of Cleves: Royal Protocol in Early Modern England. Cambridge University Press. ISBN 978-0521770378.

French nobility
Vacant Title last held by Philip	Duke of Orléans; Count of Valois; 1392–1407	Succeeded by Charles
Preceded by Guy II	Count of Blois; 1397–1407	Succeeded by Charles
Preceded by John I	Count of Angoulême; 1404–1407	Succeeded by John II
