= 1409 in France =

- Decades: 1380s; 1390s; 1400s; 1410s; 1420s
- See also: History of France; Timeline of French history; List of years in France

Events from the year 1409 in France.

== Incumbents ==
- Monarch – Charles VI

== Events ==
- 9 December - Louis II of Anjou founds the University of Aix

== Births ==
- 16 January – René of Anjou, Duke of Anjou and king of Naples, Aragon and Jerusalem (d.1480)
- 2 March - Jean II, Duke of Alençon, nobleman (died 1476)
- 13 September - Joan of Valois, Duchess of Alençon, noblewoman (died 1432)

== Deaths ==
- 13 September - Isabella of Valois, widow of Richard II of England (born 1389)
- 17 October - Jean de Montaigu, royal favourite (born 1363)
