= List of consorts of Alençon =

== Countess of Alençon ==
=== House of Capet, 1269–1284 ===
Picture	Name	Father	Birth	Marriage	Became Countess	Ceased to be Countess	Death	Spouse
	Joan, Countess of Blois	John I, Count of Blois (Châtillon)	1253	1272		6 April 1284 husband's death	19/29 January 1291	Peter I

=== House of Valois, 1291–1414/5 ===
Picture	Name	Father	Birth	Marriage	Became Countess	Ceased to be Countess	Death	Spouse
	Margaret, Countess of Anjou	Charles II of Naples (Anjou)	1273	16 August 1290	16 December 1325 husband's accession	31 December 1299		Charles I
	Catherine of Courtenay	Philip of Courtenay (Courtenay)	25 November 1274	28 February 1301		11 October 1307		Charles I
	Mahaut of Châtillon	Guy IV, Count of Saint-Pol (Châtillon)	1293	July 1308		16 December 1325 husband's death	3 October 1358	
	Joan, Countess of Joigny	John II, Count of Joigny	–	April 1314	16 December 1325 husband's accession	24 September 1336		Charles II
	Maria de La Cerda y Lara, Lady of Lunel	Infante Ferdinand de la Cerda (la Cerda)	1319	December 1336		26 August 1346 husband's death	13 March 1375	Charles II
	Marie Chamaillart, Viscountess of Beaumont-au-Maine	William Chamaillart, Lord of Anthenaise	1345	10 October 1371		20 September 1404 husband's death	18 November 1425	Peter II
	Marie of Brittany	John V, Duke of Brittany (Montfort)	18 February 1391	26 June 1396	20 September 1404 husband's accession	1414 or 1 January 1415; Created Duchess	18 December 1446	John I

== Duchess of Alençon ==
=== First Creation ===
Picture	Name	Father	Birth	Marriage	Became Duchess	Ceased to be Duchess	Death	Spouse	Ref
	Marie of Brittany	John V, Duke of Brittany (Montfort)	18 February 1391	26 June 1396	1414 or 1 January 1415; Created Duchess	25 October 1415 husband's death	18 December 1446	John I	
	Joan of Valois	Charles I, Duke of Orléans (Valois-Orléans)	August 1409	1424		19 May 1432		John II	
	Marie of Armagnac	John IV, Count of Armagnac (Armagnac)	1420/5	30 April 1437		8 September 1476 husband's death	25 July 1473	John II	
	Margaret of Harcourt	William, Count of Tancarville (Harcourt)	–	–	8 September 1476 husband's accession	before May 1488		René	
	Margaret of Lorraine	Frederick II, Count of Vaudémont (Vaudémont)	1463	14 May 1488		1 November 1492 husband's death	1/2 November 1521	René	
	Marguerite of Angoulême	Charles, Count of Angoulême (Valois-Angoulême)	11 April 1492	9 October 1509		11 April 1524/5 husband's death	21 December 1549	Charles IV	

=== Second Creation ===
- None

=== Third Creation ===
Picture	Name	Father	Birth	Marriage	Became Duchess	Ceased to be Duchess	Death	Spouse
	Marguerite of Lorraine	Francis II, Duke of Lorraine (Lorraine)	22 July 1615	2 to 3 January 1632	1646; 3rd creation	2 February 1660 husband's death	13 April 1672	Gaston de France

=== Fourth Creation ===
Picture	Name	Father	Birth	Marriage	Became Duchess	Ceased to be Duchess	Death	Spouse
	Marie Louise Élisabeth d'Orléans	Philippe d'Orléans, Duke of Orléans (Orléans)	20 August 1695	6 July 1710		5 May 1714 husband's death	21 July 1719	Charles de France

=== Fifth Creation ===
Picture	Name	Father	Birth	Marriage	Became Duchess	Ceased to be Duchess	Death	Spouse
	Duchess Sophie Charlotte in Bavaria	Duke Maximilian Joseph in Bavaria (Wittelsbach)	23 February 1847	28 September 1868		4 May 1897		Prince Ferdinand

== See also ==
- List of consorts of Orléans
