= List of English royal consorts =

Spouses of English monarchs

The English royal consorts listed here were the spouses of the reigning monarchs of the Kingdom of England, excluding joint rulers William III and Mary II who reigned together in the 17th century.

Most of the consorts were women, and enjoyed titles and honours pertaining to a queen consort; some few were men, whose titles were not consistent. The Kingdom of England merged with the Kingdom of Scotland in 1707, to form the Kingdom of Great Britain. Consorts since that date are listed at List of British royal consorts.

Athelstan, Edward the Martyr, Harthacnut, William II, Edward V, Edward VI and Elizabeth I never married and had no consorts. The marital status of Harold Harefoot is unclear.

== House of Wessex, 886–1013 ==
Name	Parents	Birth	Marriage	Became consort	Coronation	Ceased to be consort	Death	Resting place	Spouse
Ealhswith of Mercia	Æthelred Mucel	–	868	c. 886 (Queen Consort of Wessex from 23 April 871)	–	26 October 899	5 December 902	New Minster, Winchester, later Hyde Abbey	Alfred the Great
Ælfflæd	Æthelhelm (father)	–	899	26 October 899	–	Late 910s Marriage dissolved	–	–	Edward the Elder
Eadgifu of Kent	Sigehelm, Ealdorman of Kent (father)	c. 903	919		–	17 July 924	c. 966	–	Edward the Elder
Ælfgifu of Shaftesbury	–	–	–		–	944		Shaftesbury Abbey	Edmund I the Magnificent
Æthelflæd of Damerham	Ælfgar, Ealdorman of Essex (father)	–	944		–	26 May 946	between 962 (975) and 991	–	Edmund I the Magnificent
Ælfgifu	_	–	955		–	958; Marriage dissolved	September 959	Winchester Cathedral	Eadwig
Ælfthryth of Devon	Ordgar, Ealdorman of Devon	–	964/965		11 May 973	8 July 975	17 November 999–1001	–	Edgar the Peaceful
Ælfgifu of York	Thored, Ealdorman of York	–			–	–	not later than 1002	–	Ethelred II the Unready
Emma of Normandy	Richard I, Duke of Normandy; Gunnor	c. 985	1002		–	25 December 1013 husband's deposition	6 March 1052	Old Minster, Winchester - bones now in Winchester Cathedral	Ethelred II the Unready

== House of Denmark, 1013–1014 ==
Name	Parents	Birth	Marriage	Became consort	Coronation	Ceased to be consort	Death	Resting place	Spouse
Sigrid the Haughty (Dubious authenticity) and/or Świętosława of Poland			996	25 December 1013	–	3 February 1014			Sweyn Forkbeard

== House of Wessex (restored, first time), 1014–1016 ==
Name	Parents	Birth	Marriage	Became consort	Coronation	Ceased to be consort	Death	Resting place	Spouse
Emma of Normandy (again)	Richard I, Duke of Normandy; Gunnor	c. 985	1002	3 February 1014 husband's restoration	–	23 April 1016 husband's death	6 March 1052	Old Minster, Winchester - bones now in Winchester Cathedral	Ethelred II the Unready
Ealdgyth	–	c. 992	1015	23 April 1016	–	30 November 1016			Edmund II Ironside

== House of Denmark (restored), 1016–1042 ==
Name	Parents	Birth	Marriage	Became consort	Coronation	Ceased to be consort	Death	Resting place	Spouse
Emma of Normandy (again)	Richard I, Duke of Normandy; Gunnor	c. 985	July 1017		–	12 November 1035; Husband's death	6 March 1052	Old Minster, Winchester - bones now in Winchester Cathedral	Canute the Great

== House of Wessex (restored, second time), 1042–1066 ==
Name	Parents	Birth	Marriage	Became consort	Coronation	Ceased to be consort	Death	Resting place	Spouse
Edith of Wessex	Godwin, Earl of Wessex; Gytha Thorkelsdóttir	1029	23 January 1045			4 January 1066; Husband's death	19 December 1075	Westminster Abbey	Edward the Confessor
Ealdgyth	Ælfgar, Earl of Mercia; Ælfgifu	Unknown, fl. c. 1057	January 1066		Not crowned	14 October 1066; Husband's death	1066	Not known	Harold II Godwinson

== House of Normandy, 1066–1135, & 1141 ==
In 1066, the Duke of Normandy, William, killed Harold Godwinson at the Battle of Hastings, and overthrew the English elite, beginning the Norman Conquest of England. He established himself as king, his wife Matilda as queen consort, and beneficed his faithful vassals from the continent. His dynasty would not, however, outlive his children, becoming defunct with the death of his youngest son, Henry I, in 1135.

Portrait	Name	Parents	Birth	Marriage	Became consort	Coronation	Ceased to be consort	Death	Resting place	Spouse
	Matilda of Flanders	Baldwin V, Count of Flanders; Adela of France	c. 1031	1053	25 December 1066; Husband's accession	11 May 1068	2 November 1083		Abbey of the Holy Trinity, Caen	William I
	Matilda of Scotland	Malcolm III of Scotland; Margaret of Wessex	c. 1080	11 November 1100		11 November 1100	1 May 1118		Westminster Abbey	Henry I
	Adeliza of Louvain	Godfrey I, Count of Leuven; Ida of Chiny	c. 1103	24 January 1121		30 January 1121	1 December 1135; Husband's death	23 April 1151	Affligem Abbey	Henry I

=== Disputed consort ===
Since Empress Matilda was a significant claimant to the English throne during the Anarchy, her husband, Geoffrey of Anjou, is included here.

Picture	Name	Parents	Birth	Marriage	Became consort	Coronation	Ceased to be consort	Death	Resting place	Spouse
	Geoffrey V of Anjou	Fulk V of Anjou; Ermengarde of Maine	24 August 1113	1128	7 April 1141; Wife's accession (disputed)	-	1148; Wife's deposition	7 September 1151	Le Mans Cathedral	Matilda

== House of Blois, 1135–1154 ==
In 1135, Stephen of Blois, the son of Henry I's sister Adela, seized the English throne, his cousin Empress Matilda's claims being ignored by the Norman barons. His wife, Matilda of Boulogne, became his Queen consort, but their son Eustace predeceased Stephen, and he was forced to appoint the Empress's son Henry as his successor.

Portrait	Name	Arms	Parents	Birth	Marriage	Became consort	Coronation	Ceased to be consort	Death	Resting place	Spouse
	Matilda of Boulogne		Eustace III, Count of Boulogne; Mary of Scotland	c. 1105	1125	22 December 1135; Husband's accession	22 March 1136	3 May 1152		Faversham Abbey (tomb since lost)	Stephen

== House of Plantagenet, 1154–1485 ==
Picture	Name	Arms	Parents	Birth	Marriage	Became consort	Coronation	Ceased to be consort	Death	Resting place	Spouse
	Eleanor of Aquitaine		William X, Duke of Aquitaine; Aenor de Châtellerault	c. 1122	18 May 1152	19 December 1154; Husband's accession	19 December 1154	6 July 1189; Husband's death	1 April 1204	Fontevraud Abbey	Henry II
	Margaret of France		Louis VII of France; Constance of Castile	1158	1162	1170; Husband's accession	27 August 1172	11 June 1183; Husband's death	1197	Cathedral of Tyre	Henry the Young King
	Berengaria of Navarre		Sancho VI of Navarre; Sancha of Castile	Between 1165 and 1170	12 May 1191			6 April 1199; Husband's death	23 December 1230	L'Épau Abbey	Richard I
	Isabella of Gloucester		William I, Earl of Gloucester; Hawise of Leicester	c. 1166	29 August 1189	27 May 1199; Husband's accession	Uncrowned	August 1200; Annulled	October 1217	Canterbury Cathedral	John
	Isabelle of Angoulême		Aymer of Angoulême; Alice of Courtenay	c. 1187	24 August 1200		8 October 1200	18 or 19 October 1216; Husband's death	4 June 1246	Fontevraud Abbey	John

== House of Capet (disputed) ==
Prince Louis, future Louis VIII of France, invaded England after being invited by English barons to become King of England to replace John. Louis claimed the throne from his wife Blanche of Castile's right, as the granddaughter of Henry II. He briefly won two-thirds of England over to his side, but suffered military losses and alienation after John's death. Blanche provided reinforcements to aid Louis, but they were defeated at the Battle of Sandwich. Louis agreed that he was never king of England in the Treaty of Lambeth but gained 10,000 marks.

Picture	Name	Arms	Parents	Birth	Marriage	Became consort	Coronation	Ceased to be consort	Death	Resting place	Spouse
	Blanche of Castile		Alfonso VIII, Eleanor of England	4 March 1188	23 May 1200	2 June 1216 Husband's accession (disputed)	-	20 September 1217 Husband's deposition	27 November 1252	Maubuisson Abbey	Louis

== House of Plantagenet, 1154–1485 ==
Picture	Name	Arms	Parents	Birth	Marriage	Became consort	Coronation	Ceased to be consort	Death	Resting place	Spouse
	Eleanor of Provence		Ramon Berenguer IV, Count of Provence; Beatrice of Savoy	c. 1223	14 January 1236		20 January 1236	16 November 1272; Husband's death	24 June 1291	Amesbury Abbey	Henry III
	Eleanor of Castile		Ferdinand III of Castile; Joan, Countess of Ponthieu	1241	1 November 1254	20 November 1272; Husband's accession	19 August 1274	28 November 1290		Westminster Abbey	Edward I
	Margaret of France		Philip III of France; Marie of Brabant	c. 1279	8 September 1299		Uncrowned	7 July 1307; Husband's death	14 February 1318	Christ Church Greyfriars	Edward I
	Isabella of France		Philip IV of France; Joan I of Navarre	1285	20 May 1303 (by proxy); 24 January 1308		25 February 1308	20 January 1327; Husband's deposition	22 August 1358	Christ Church Greyfriars	Edward II
	Philippa of Hainault		William I, Count of Hainaut; Joan of Valois	24 June 1314	24 January 1328		18 February 1330	15 August 1369		Westminster Abbey	Edward III
	Anne of Bohemia		Charles IV, Holy Roman Emperor; Elizabeth of Pomerania	11 May 1366	20 January 1382		22 January 1382	7 June 1394		Westminster Abbey	Richard II
	Isabella of Valois		Charles VI of France; Isabeau of Bavaria	9 November 1387	12 March 1396 (by proxy); 31 October 1396		8 January 1397	30 September 1399; Husband's deposition	13 September 1409	Abbey of St Laumer - later the Convent of the Celestines in Paris	Richard II

=== House of Lancaster, 1399–1461, 1470–1471 ===
Mary de Bohun, the first wife of Henry IV, died in 1394, 5 years before he became king. Therefore, she is not regarded as a consort.

Picture	Name	Arms	Parents	Birth	Marriage	Became consort	Coronation	Ceased to be consort	Death	Resting place	Spouse
	Joan of Navarre		Charles II of Navarre; Joan of Valois	c. 1370	7 February 1403		26 February 1403	20 March 1413; Husband's death	10 June 1437	Canterbury Cathedral	Henry IV
	Catherine of Valois		Charles VI of France; Isabeau of Bavaria	27 October 1401	2 June 1420		23 February 1421	31 August 1422; Husband's death	3 January 1437	Westminster Abbey	Henry V
	Margaret of Anjou		René of Anjou; Isabella, Duchess of Lorraine	23 March 1430	24 May 1444 (by proxy); 22 April 1445		30 May 1445	11 April 1471; Husband's deposition	25 August 1482	Angers Cathedral	Henry VI

=== House of York, 1461–1470, 1471–1485 ===
Picture	Name	Arms	Parents	Birth	Marriage	Became consort	Coronation	Ceased to be consort	Death	Resting place	Spouse
	Elizabeth Woodville		Richard Woodville, 1st Earl Rivers; Jacquetta of Luxembourg	c. 1437	c. May 1464		26 May 1465	9 April 1483; Husband's death	8 June 1492	St George's Chapel, Windsor Castle	Edward IV
	Anne Neville		Richard Neville, 16th Earl of Warwick; Anne Beauchamp, 16th Countess of Warwick	11 June 1456	12 July 1472	26 June 1483; Husband's accession	6 July 1483	16 March 1485		Westminster Abbey	Richard III

== House of Tudor, 1485–1603 ==
Picture	Name	Arms	Parents	Birth	Marriage	Became consort	Coronation	Ceased to be consort	Death	Resting place	Spouse
	Elizabeth of York		Edward IV of England; Elizabeth Woodville	11 February 1466	25 December 1483 (by proxy); 18 January 1486		25 November 1487	11 February 1503		Henry VII Chapel, Westminster Abbey	Henry VII
	Catherine of Aragon		Ferdinand II of Aragon; Isabella I of Castile	16 December 1485	11 June 1509		24 June 1509	23 May 1533; Marriage annulled or 7 January 1536; Death	7 January 1536	Peterborough Cathedral	Henry VIII
	Anne Boleyn		Thomas Boleyn, 1st Earl of Wiltshire; Lady Elizabeth Howard	Between 1501 and 1507	14 November 1532 (in secret); 25 January 1533 (second service); 28 May 1533 (marriage declared legal)		1 June 1533	17 May 1536; Marriage annulled	19 May 1536 Executed	Church of St Peter ad Vincula	Henry VIII
	Jane Seymour		Sir John Seymour; Margery Wentworth	c.1509	30 May 1536		Uncrowned	24 October 1537		St George's Chapel, Windsor Castle	Henry VIII
	Anne of Cleves		John III, Duke of Cleves; Maria of Jülich-Berg	28 June or 22 September 1515	4 October 1539 (by proxy); 6 January 1540		Uncrowned	12 July 1540; Marriage annulled	16 July 1557	Westminster Abbey	Henry VIII
	Catherine Howard		Lord Edmund Howard; Joyce Culpeper	c.1524	28 July 1540		Uncrowned	13 February 1542; Executed		Church of St Peter ad Vincula	Henry VIII
	Catherine Parr		Sir Thomas Parr; Maud Green	August 1512	12 July 1543		Uncrowned	28 January 1547; Husband's death	5 September 1548	St. Mary's Chapel, Sudeley Castle	Henry VIII

The husband of Queen Mary I was Philip II of Spain, who became king of England in right of his wife. Therefore, he is not regarded as a consort.

=== Disputed consort ===
Since Lady Jane Grey was briefly queen, her husband, Guildford Dudley, is included here. They were both executed for treason.

Picture	Name	Arms	Parents	Birth	Marriage	Became consort	Coronation	Ceased to be consort	Death	Resting place	Spouse
	Lord Guildford Dudley		John Dudley, 1st Duke of Northumberland; Jane Guildford	c. 1535	25 May 1553	10 July 1553; Wife's accession (disputed)	Uncrowned	19 July 1553; Wife's deposition	12 February 1554	Church of St Peter ad Vincula	Jane

== House of Stuart, 1603–1707 ==
With the death of Elizabeth I, the crown of England passed to her cousin and nearest heir, James VI of Scotland, who became James I of England as well. His dynasty would rule – interrupted by the Interregnum between 1649 and 1660 – until 1714. The Kingdom of England, however, was merged with the Kingdom of Scotland in 1707, to form a new Kingdom, the Kingdom of Great Britain, after which there ceased to be monarchs and consorts of England.

Picture	Name	Arms	Parents	Birth	Marriage	Became consort	Coronation	Ceased to be consort	Death	Resting place	Spouse
	Anne of Denmark		Frederick II of Denmark; Sophie of Mecklenburg-Güstrow	12 December 1574	20 August 1589 (by proxy); 23 November 1589	24 March 1603; Husband's accession	25 July 1603	4 March 1619		Henry VII Chapel, Westminster Abbey	James I
	Henrietta Maria of France		Henry IV of France; Marie de' Medici	25 November 1609	11 May 1625 (by proxy); 13 June 1625		Uncrowned	30 January 1649; Husband's death	10 September 1669	Basilica of St Denis	Charles I
	Catherine of Braganza		John IV of Portugal; Luisa de Guzmán	25 November 1638	23 April 1662 (by proxy); 21 May 1662		Uncrowned	6 February 1685; Husband's death	30 November 1705	Monastery of São Vicente de Fora	Charles II
	Mary of Modena		Alfonso IV d'Este, Duke of Modena; Laura Martinozzi	5 October 1658	30 September 1673 (by proxy)	6 February 1685; Husband's accession	23 April 1685	11 December 1688; Husband's deposition	7 May 1718	Convent of the Visitations, Chaillot	James II
	George of Denmark		Frederick III of Denmark; Sophie Amalie of Brunswick-Lüneburg	2 April 1653	28 July 1683	8 March 1702; Wife's accession	Uncrowned	1 May 1707; Act of Union 1707; continued as British royal consort	28 October 1708	Westminster Abbey	Anne

James II's first wife, Anne Hyde, died in 1671, 17 years before his accession to the throne. Therefore, she is not regarded as a consort.

== Continuation of the list (British consorts) ==
This list continues at List of British royal consorts

== See also ==
- List of English monarchs
- List of English royal mistresses
- List of royal consorts of Wessex
- List of Scottish royal consorts
- List of Irish royal consorts
- List of Aquitanian royal consorts
- Duchess of Normandy
- List of Angevin consorts
