= Joan of Valois =

Joan of Valois may be:

- Joan of Valois, Countess of Hainaut (1294–1342)
- Joan of Valois, Countess of Beaumont (1304–1363)
- Joan of Valois, Queen of Navarre (1343–1373)
- Joan of France, Duchess of Brittany (1391–1433)
- Joan of Valois, Duchess of Alençon (1409–1432)
- Joan of France, Duchess of Bourbon (1435–1482)
- Jeanne de Valois, Dame de Mirabeau (1447–1519), illegitimate daughter of Louis XI of France, by Félizé Regnard; legitimated in 1466, and married to Louis de Bourbon, comte de Roussillon
- Joan of France, Duchess of Berry (1464–1505), Catholic saint
- Joan of Valois (stillborn 1556), daughter of Catherine de' Medici
- Jeanne de Valois-Saint-Rémy (1756–1791)
