= 1415 in France =

- Decades: 1390s; 1400s; 1410s; 1420s; 1430s
- See also: History of France; Timeline of French history; List of years in France

Events from the year 1415 in France.

== Incumbents ==
- Monarch – Charles VI

== Events ==
- 18 August – The siege of Harfleur begins during the Hundred Years War.
- 25 October – Henry V of England's army defeats the French army at the Battle of Agincourt.

== Births ==
- Unknown – Jeanne de Bar, Countess of Marle and Soissons, noblewoman (died 1462)

== Deaths ==
- 25 October – Jean I, Duke of Alençon, nobleman, killed at Agincourt (born 1385)
- 25 October – Charles I of Albret, Constable of France, killed at Agincourt (born 1368)
- 25 October – Philip II, Count of Nevers, nobleman, killed at Agincourt (born 1389)
- 25 October – Frederick I, Count of Vaudémont, nobleman, killed at Agincourt (born 1371)
- 9 November – Pierre Girard, cardinal
- 18 December – Louis, Duke of Guyenne, nobleman (born 1397)
