= Joan of Navarre, Queen of England =

Queen of England from 1403 to 1413

Joan of Navarre
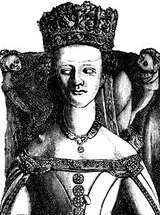
- Tomb effigy (detail) in Canterbury Cathedral

Duchess consort of Brittany
- Tenure: 2 October 1386 – 1 November 1399

Queen consort of England
- Tenure: 7 February 1403 – 20 March 1413
- Coronation: 26 February 1403
- Born: c. 1368; Pamplona, Navarre
- Died: 10 June 1437 (aged c. 68–69); Havering-atte-Bower, Essex, England
- Burial: 11 August 1437; Canterbury Cathedral, Kent
- Spouses: John IV, Duke of Brittany (m. 1386; died 1399) King Henry IV of England (m. 1403; died 1413)
- Issue among others: John V, Duke of Brittany; Marie, Duchess of Alençon; Arthur III of Brittany; Richard, Count of Étampes
- House: Évreux
- Father: Charles II of Navarre
- Mother: Joan of Valois

Joan of Navarre, also known as Joanna (c. 1368 – 10 June 1437) was Duchess of Brittany by marriage to Duke John IV and later Queen of England as the wife of King Henry IV. She was the daughter of Charles II of Navarre and Joan of France. She served as regent of Brittany from 1399 until 1403 during the minority of her eldest son, Duke John V. She also served as regent of England during the absence of her stepson King Henry V in 1415. Four years later, Henry V imprisoned her and confiscated her money and land. Joan was released in 1422, shortly before Henry's death.

== Duchess of Brittany ==
On 2 October 1386, Joan married her first husband, John IV, Duke of Brittany (known in traditional English sources as John V). She was his third wife and the only one with whom he had children.

John IV died on 1 November 1399 and was succeeded by his and Joan's son, John V. Her son being still a minor, she was made his guardian and the regent of Brittany during his minority. Not long after, King Henry IV of England proposed to marry her. The marriage proposal was given out of mutual personal preference rather than a dynastic marriage. According to the Encyclopædia Britannica, affection developed between Joan and Henry while he resided at the Breton court during his banishment from England. Joan gave a favourable reply to the proposal, but stated that she could not go through with it until she had set the affairs of Brittany in order and arranged for the security of the duchy and her children.

Joan knew that it would not be possible for her to continue as regent of Brittany after having married the king of England, nor would she be able to take her sons with her to England. A papal dispensation was necessary for the marriage, which was obtained in 1402. She negotiated with the duke of Burgundy to make him guardian of her sons and regent of Brittany. Finally, she surrendered the custody of her sons and her power as regent of Brittany to the duke of Burgundy, who swore to respect the Breton rights and law, and departed for England with her daughters.

== Queen of England ==
Joan of Navarre's arms as queen consort

On 7 February 1403, Joan married Henry IV at Winchester Cathedral. On the 26th, she held her formal entry to London, where she was crowned queen of England. Queen Joan was described as beautiful, gracious and majestic, but also as greedy and stingy, and was accused of accepting bribes. Reportedly, she did not have a good impression of England, as a Breton ship was attacked outside the English coast just after her wedding. She preferred the company of her Breton entourage, which caused offence to such a degree that her Breton courtiers were exiled by order of Parliament, a ban the king did not think he could oppose given his sensitive relation to the Parliament at the time.

Joan and Henry had no surviving children, but it appears that in 1403 Joan gave birth to stillborn twins. She is recorded as having had a good relationship with Henry's children from his first marriage, often taking the side of the future Henry V in his quarrels with his father. Her daughters returned to Brittany three years after their arrival on the order of their brother, her son.

== Queen dowager ==
In 1413, her second spouse died, succeeded by her stepson Henry V. Joan had a very good relationship with Henry, who allowed her use of his royal castles of Windsor, Wallingford, Berkhamsted and Hertford during his absence in France in 1415. Upon his return, however, he brought her son Arthur of Brittany with him as a prisoner. Joan unsuccessfully tried to have him released. This apparently damaged her relationship with Henry.

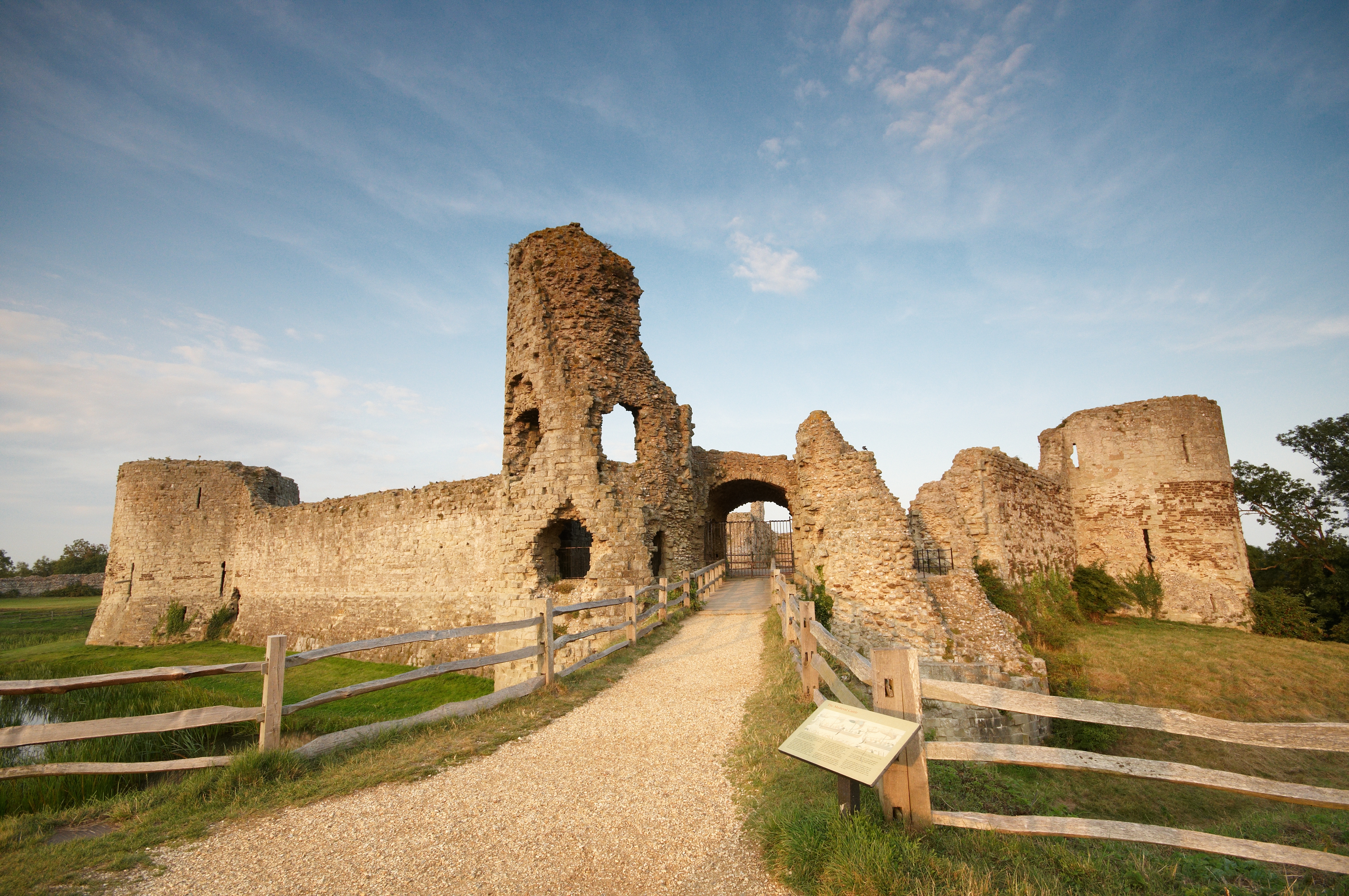
The ruins of Pevensey Castle where Joan was imprisoned in 1419.

In August 1419 the goods of her personal confessor, Friar Randolph, were confiscated, although the itemised list shows the objects actually belonged to Joan. The following month, Randolph came before Parliament and claimed that Joan had "plotted and schemed for the death and destruction of our said lord the King in the most evil and terrible manner imaginable". Her large fortune was confiscated and she was imprisoned at Pevensey Castle in Sussex and later at Leeds Castle in Kent. She was released upon the order of Henry V in 1422, six weeks before he died.

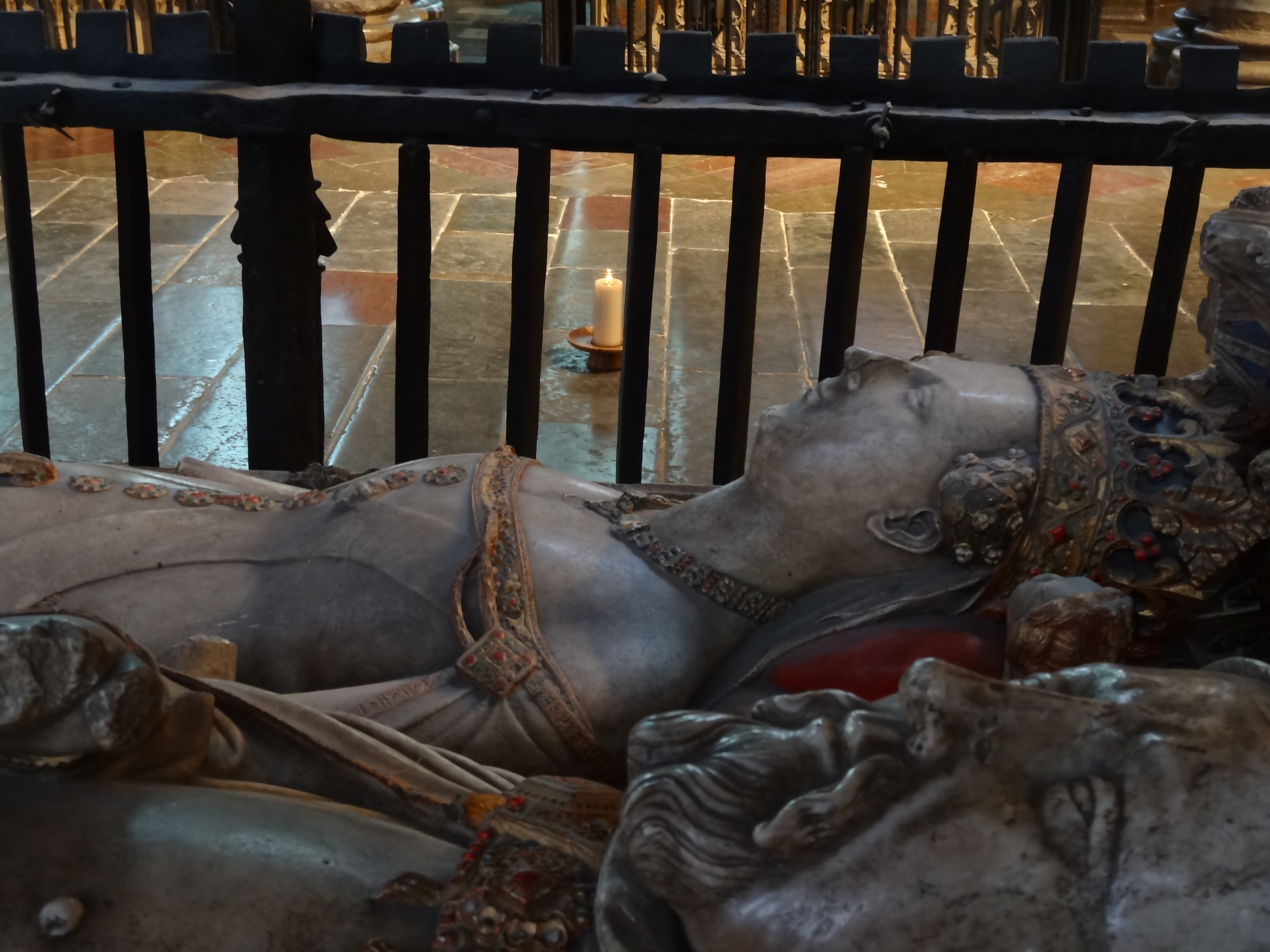
Joan's funeral effigy in Canterbury Cathedral, beside that of her husband.

== Accusations of Witchcraft and Imprisonment ==
In August 1419, her considerable dowry and other fortunes were confiscated; four days later she was arrested and imprisoned at the Rotherhithe manor-house in Surrey. Her royal confessor, John Randolf, had accused her of plotting to kill King Henry V "in the most evil and terrible manner imaginable", implying the use of witchcraft. She was released from house arrest upon the order of Henry V in 1422 while he was suffering an illness.

Two accounts exist of her period in confinement, one from October to December 1419 and the other from 1420 to 1421. They reveal that she lived in relative luxury for most of her house arrest, accessing expensive foods and wine, riding and organising presents for her many servants. She hosted the Archbishop of Canterbury and the Duke of Gloucester (her stepson) while imprisoned.

After her release, her fortune was returned to her, and she lived the rest of her life quietly and comfortably with her own court at Nottingham Castle, through Henry V's reign and into that of his son, Henry VI. She died at Havering-atte-Bower in Essex and was buried in Canterbury Cathedral next to Henry IV.

John Foxholes, of Cheryton, in Hampshire is described as her "receiver general" in 1433.

== Issue ==
Her first marriage to John IV, Duke of Brittany produced 9 children:

- Joan of Brittany (Nantes, 12 August 1387 – 7 December 1388).
- Isabelle of Brittany (October 1388 – December 1388).
- Duke John V of Brittany (Château de l'Hermine, near Vannes, Morbihan, 24 December 1389 – manoir de La Touche, near Nantes 29 August 1442). Married Joan of France, daughter of King Charles VI of France and Isabeau of Bavaria, in 1396. Had issue.
- Marie of Brittany (Nantes, 18 February 1391 – 18 December 1446), Lady of La Guerche, married at the Château de l'Hermine (Vannes) on 26 June 1398 to John I, Count of Alençon and Perche, later Duke of Alençon.
- Margaret of Brittany (1392 – 13 April 1428), Lady of Guillac, married on 26 June 1407, Alain IX, Viscount of Rohan and Count of Porhoët (d. 1462)
- Duke Arthur III of Brittany (Château de Succinio, 24 August 1393 – Nantes, 26 December 1458). Married firstly Margaret of Burgundy (m. 1423; died 1442); secondly, Joan of Albret (m. 1442; died 1444); and thirdly, Catherine of Luxembourg (m. 1445). No issue.
- Gilles of Brittany (1394 – Cosne-sur-Loire, 19 July 1412), Lord of Chantocé and Ingrande.
- Richard of Brittany (1395 – Château de Clisson 2 June 1438), Count of Benon, Étampes, and Mantes, married at the Château de Blois, Loir-et-Cher on 29 August 1423 Margaret d'Orléans, Countess of Vertus, daughter of Louis I, Duke of Orléans. Had issue.
- Blanche of Brittany (1397 – bef. 1419), married at Nantes on 26 June 1407 Jean IV, Count of Armagnac.

Her second marriage to King Henry IV of England produced two infants who did not survive:

- Stillborn twins (1403)

== Ancestry ==
Ancestors of Joan of Navarre, Queen of England

8. Louis, Count of Évreux
4. Philip III of Navarre
9. Margaret of Artois
2. Charles II of Navarre
10. Louis X of France
5. Joan II of Navarre
11. Margaret of Burgundy
1. Joan of Navarre
12. Philip VI of France
6. John II of France
13. Joan the Lame
3. Joan of France
14. John of Bohemia
7. Bonne of Luxembourg
15. Elisabeth of Bohemia

== Sources ==
- Strickland, Agnes (1872). Lives of the Queens of England From The Norman Conquest. Vol. I. Bell & Daldy.

Joan of Navarre, Queen of England House of Évreux Cadet branch of the Capetian dynasty Born: 1368 Died: 10 June 1437
French nobility
Vacant Title last held by Joan Holland	Duchess consort of Brittany; 2 October 1386 – 1 November 1399	Succeeded by Joan of France
English royalty
Vacant Title last held by Isabella of Valois	Queen consort of England; 7 February 1403 – 20 March 1413	Vacant Title next held by Catherine of Valois
