= John II, Duke of Alençon =

15th-century Duke of Alençon

Jean II
- Duke of Alençon
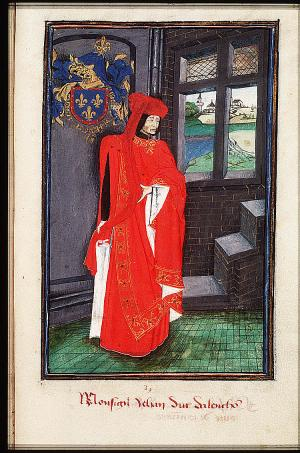
- John of Alençon, dressed as a Knight of the Golden Fleece
- Born: 2 March 1409; Château d'Argentan
- Died: 8 September 1476 (aged 67); Paris
- Noble family: Valois-Alençon
- Spouses: Joan of Valois (m. 1424; died 1432) Marie of Armagnac (m. 1437; died 1473)
- Issue: Catherine; René of Alençon
- Father: John I, Duke of Alençon
- Mother: Marie of Brittany

Jean II of Alençon (Jean II d’Alençon) (2 March 1409 – 8 September 1476) was a French nobleman. He succeeded his father as Duke of Alençon and Count of Perche as a minor in 1415, after the latter's death at the Battle of Agincourt. He is best known as a general in the last phase of the Hundred Years' War and for his role as a comrade-in-arms of Joan of Arc.

== Biography ==
Jean was born at the Château d'Argentan, the son of John I of Alençon and Marie of Brittany. He first saw action at the age of 15 at the Battle of Verneuil on 17 August 1424, and was captured by the English. He was held prisoner until 1429 at Le Crotoy, paying 200,000 saluts d'or for his ransom. He sold all he possessed to the English, and his fief of Fougères to the Duke of Brittany. After Alençon's capture, the Duke of Bedford, regent of King Henry VI, took control of his duchy. He would not regain Alençon until 1449, but remained the titular duke in the eyes of the French crown. When he left prison, Jean d'Alençon was called "the poorest man in France."

Before his capture at Verneuil, he had married in 1424, at the Chateau de Blois, Joan, daughter of Charles, Duke of Orléans, and Isabella of Valois, but she died in Angers in 1432, having had no children.

In April 1429, not long after his release, the Duke heard about Joan of Arc, who had come to King Charles VII at Chinon, promising to liberate France from the English, asking that he send her with an army to lift the Siege of Orléans. Alençon came eagerly to Chinon and very quickly became her good friend and most prominent supporter among the princes of the blood. After she raised the siege alongside Jean de Dunois and La Hire, among others, Alençon arrived as the official commander of the French army and played a major role in the liberation of the rest of the Loire Valley. He left to fight elsewhere after the end of the campaign in September 1429, preferring to attack the English around his domains in Normandy.

On 30 April 1437, at the Chateau L'Isle-Jourdain, he married Marie of Armagnac, daughter of Jean IV, Count of Armagnac.

Jean was discontented with the Treaty of Arras, having hoped to make good his poverty through the spoliation of the Burgundians. He fell out with Charles VII, and took part in a revolt in 1439–40, (the Praguerie) but was forgiven, having been a lifelong friend of the king. He took part in the invasion of Normandy in 1449, but he had unwisely entered into correspondence with the English in 1455. (He had also accepted the Order of the Golden Fleece at this time.) Shortly after participating in the "rehabilitation trial" of Joan of Arc in 1456 where he provided extensive testimony, Jean was arrested by Jean de Dunois and imprisoned at Aigues-Mortes. In 1458, he was convicted of lèse-majesté (treason against the king) and sentenced to death, but the sentence was commuted and he was sentenced to imprisonment. He was released by the next king, Louis XI, upon terms at his accession in 1461, but he refused to keep them and was imprisoned again. He was tried a second time before the Parlement of Paris and sentenced to death again on 18 July 1474, and his Duchy was confiscated. However, the sentence was not carried out, and he died in prison in the Louvre Palace in 1476.

== Personal life ==
Jean had two children by his second wife, Marie:

- Catherine (1452–1505), married 1461, in Tours, Guy XV de Laval (died 1501)
- René of Alençon (1454–1492), who would regain his father's confiscated titles of Duke of Alençon and Count of Perche in 1478

Jean also had several illegitimate children:

- Jean (living 1483)
- Robert (living 1489)
- Jeanne (d. aft. 4 December 1481), Countess of Beaumont-le-Roger, married in 1470 to Guy de Maulmont
- Madeleine, married Henri de Breuil

== Ancestors ==
Ancestors of John II, Duke of Alençon

8. Charles II of Alençon
4. Peter II of Alençon
9. María de la Cerda
2. John I, Duke of Alençon
10. Guillaume II Chamaillard
5. Marie Chamaillard
11. Marie de Brienne
1. John II, Duke of Alençon
12. John of Montfort
6. John IV of Brittany
13. Joanna of Flanders
3. Marie of Brittany
14. Charles II of Navarre
7. Joan of Navarre
15. Joan of Valois

John II, Duke of Alençon House of Valois-Alençon Cadet branch of the Capetian dynasty Born: 2 March 1409 Died: 8 September 1476
Preceded by John I	Duke of Alençon; 1415–1474	Succeeded by René
Preceded by John I	Count of Perche; 1415–1474	Succeeded by René

== Sources ==
- Champion, Pierre (2015). The Trial of Jeanne D'arc. Aeterna Press.
- Goodrich, Norma Lorre (1967). Charles of Orléans: A Study of Themes in his French and in his English Poetry. Librairie Droz.
- Knecht, Robert (2004). The Valois: Kings of France, 1328–1589. Hambledon Continuum.
- Manning, Scott (2023). Joan of Arc: A Reference Guide to Her Life and Works. Rowman & Littlefield. ISBN 978-1538139165.
- Potter, David (1995). Keen, Maurice (ed.). A History of France, 1460–1560: The Emergence of a Nation State. Macmillan.
- Taylor, Craig, ed. (2006). Joan of Arc, La Pucelle. Manchester University Press.
- Tucker, Spencer C., ed. (2010). "August 17, 1424: Western Europe: France: Hundred Years' War: Battle of Verneuil". A Global Chronology of Conflict: From the Ancient World to the Modern Middle East. ABC-CLIO.
- Walsby, Malcolm (2007). The Counts of Laval. Aldershot: Ashgate Publishing Company. ISBN 978-0754658115.
