= 1413 in France =

- Decades: 1390s; 1400s; 1410s; 1420s; 1430s
- See also: History of France; Timeline of French history; List of years in France

Events from the year 1413 in France.

== Incumbents ==
- Monarch – Charles VI

== Events ==
- 21 March - Henry V succeeded his father as King of England and revives his family's claim to the French throne.
- Spring - As part of the Cabochien revolt, John the Fearless leads an uprising in Paris against the Armagnacs.
- Unknown - The role of Grand Huntsman of France is created.

== Births ==
- Philippe de Culant, soldier (died 1454)
