= The Battle of Agincourt (painting) =

Painting by William Kent

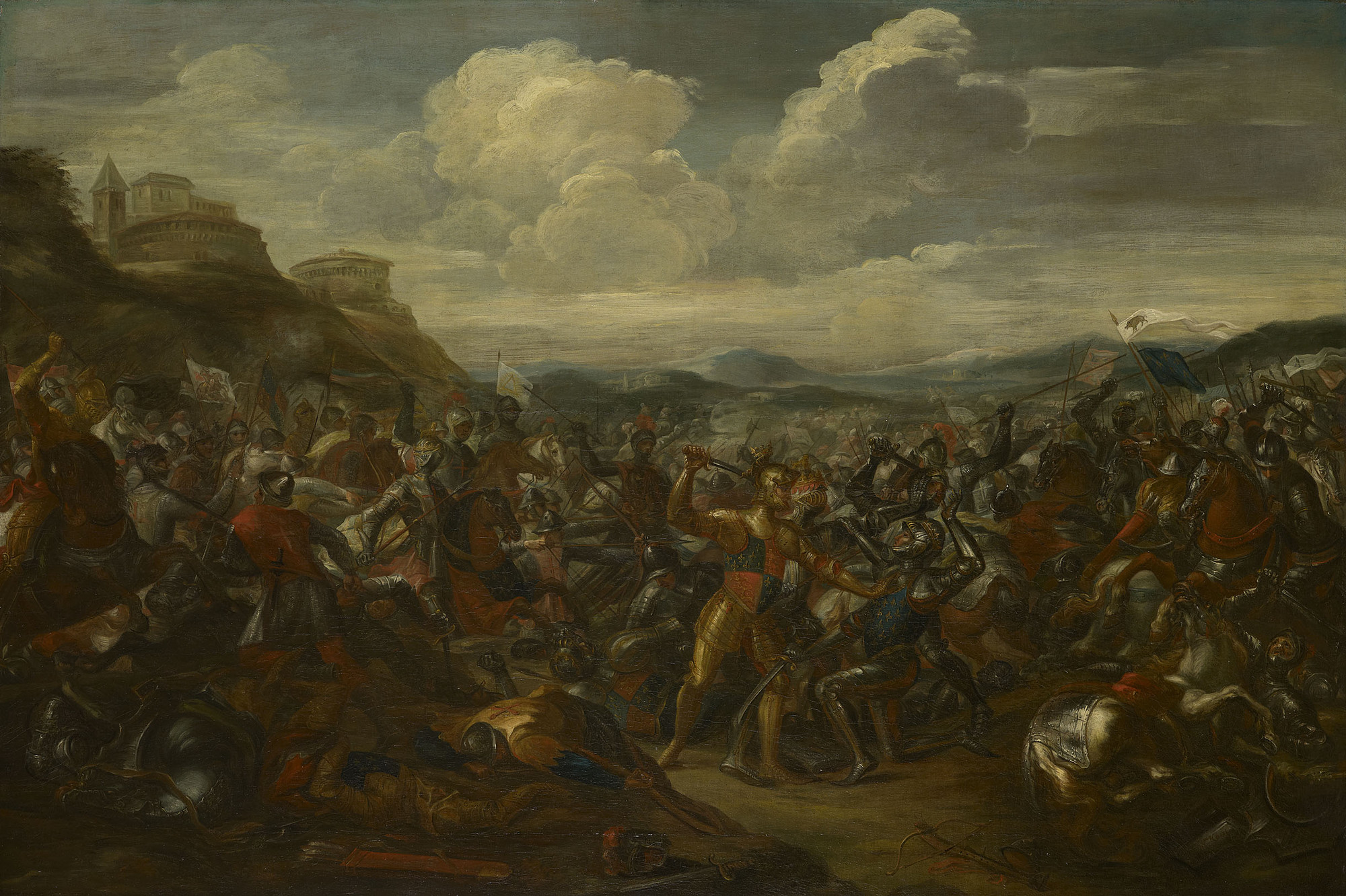
- Artist: William Kent
- Year: 1729
- Medium: Oil on canvas
- Dimensions: 82 cm × 122.2 cm (32 in × 48.1 in)
- Location: Royal Collection

The Battle of Agincourt is a 1729 history painting by the British artist William Kent. It depicts the Battle of Agincourt fought on 25 October 1415 during the Hundred Years War, a major victory for the England and Henry V who was advancing a claim to the French throne. The fighting is shown as a melee with Henry V recognisable due to the royal coat of arms emblazoned on his armour as he kills a figure presumed to be the Duke of Alençon.

Kent received major patronage for his architecture from Queen Caroline, the wife of George II and he was commissioned by her to produce this picture for her dressing room at Kensington Palace. Although German- born Caroline had a passion for the history of the English. It was one of trio of scenes Kent produced for Caroline illustrating moments from the life of the king – he also painted both the first meeting between Henry and the Queen of France and his subsequent marriage to Catherine of Valois. Roy Strong considers the three paintings as a key moment in the development of a tradition of producing scenes of British history. The paintings remain in the Royal Collection today.

== Bibliography ==
- Campbell Orr, Clarissa (ed.) Queenship in Britain, 1660–1837: Royal Patronage, Court Culture, and Dynastic Politics. Manchester University Press, 2002.
- McMullan, Gordon, Retford, Kate, Tambling, Kirsten & Barnden, Sally. Shakespeare's Afterlife in the Royal Collection: Dynasty, Ideology, and National Culture:'. . Oxford University Press, 2025.
- Strong, Roy. Painting the Past: The Victorian Painter and British History. Pimlico, 2004.
