= Joan Holland, Duchess of Brittany =

Duchess of Brittany from 1366 to 1384

Lady Joan Holland

Duchess consort of Brittany
- Tenure: 1366–1384
- Born: 1350
- Died: 1384 (aged 33–34)
- Spouse: John IV of Brittany (m. 1366)
- House: Holland
- Father: Thomas Holland, 1st Earl of Kent
- Mother: Joan of Kent

Lady Joan Holland (1350 – October 1384) was Duchess of Brittany as the second wife of John IV of Brittany. She was the daughter of Joan of Kent and Thomas Holland, 1st Earl of Kent. Her mother's second husband was Edward the Black Prince, and the child of that marriage was King Richard II of England.

Joan Holland's marriage to John IV took place in London in May 1366, but without the approval of King Edward III of England, Joan's step-grandfather, who claimed overlordship of Brittany. The couple had no children.

Joan's death, in her thirties, was politically inexpedient. In 1386, two years afterwards, John IV married Joan of Navarre, later the queen of King Henry IV of England.

Preceded by Mary of Waltham	Duchess consort of Brittany; 1366-1384	Succeeded by Joan of Navarre
