= 1407 in France =

- Decades: 1380s; 1390s; 1400s; 1410s; 1420s
- See also: History of France; Timeline of French history; List of years in France

Events from the year 1407 in France.

== Incumbents ==
- Monarch – Charles VI

== Events ==
- 20 November - A truce is agreed between the warring nobles John the Fearless, Duke of Burgundy and Louis I, Duke of Orléans
- 23 November - The Duke of Orleans is assassinated by adherents of the Duke of Burgundy leading to continued conflict between the factions
- Unknown - Construction is completed on the Nyons Bridge over the River Eygues

== Births ==
- Unknown - Marguerite, bâtarde de France, noblewoman (died 1458)

== Deaths ==
- 23 November - Louis I, Duke of Orléans, brother of Charles VI (born 1372)
