= 1406 in France =

- Decades: 1380s; 1390s; 1400s; 1410s; 1420s
- See also: History of France; Timeline of French history; List of years in France

Events from the year 1406 in France.

== Incumbents ==
- Monarch – Charles VI

== Births ==
- 4 December – Margaret, Countess of Vertus, Duchess of Brittany (died 1466)
- Unknown – Richard Olivier de Longueil, cardinal (died 1470)
