= 1411 in France =

- Decades: 1390s; 1400s; 1410s; 1420s; 1430s
- See also: History of France; Timeline of French history; List of years in France

Events from the year 1411 in France.

== Incumbents ==
- Monarch – Charles VI

== Events ==
- June 4 - Charles VI grants a monopoly for the ripening of Roquefort cheese to the people of Roquefort-sur-Soulzon.

== Births ==
- Unknown - Isabella of Brittany (died 1444)

== Deaths ==
- July 15 - Jean Petit, theologian (born 1360)
