= 1412 in France =

- Decades: 1390s; 1400s; 1410s; 1420s; 1430s
- See also: History of France; Timeline of French history; List of years in France

Events from the year 1412 in France.

== Incumbents ==
- Monarch – Charles VI

== Events ==
- May – Treaty of Bourges is signed between Henry IV, of England and dukes of Berry, Bourbon and Orléans. The treaty involved ceding Aquitaine and other lands to the English throne in exchange for support in a civil war.
- August – An English army under the command of Thomas duke of Clarence arrives in France as part of the Treaty of Bourges, but is met with opposition since the waring French factions had made peace in the months that passed since the signing of the agreement.

== Births ==
- Joan of Arc, folk heroine and Roman Catholic saint (died 1431)
- Thomas Basin, bishop (died 1491)
