= 1417 in France =

- Decades: 1390s; 1400s; 1410s; 1420s; 1430s
- See also: History of France; Timeline of French history; List of years in France

Events from the year 1417 in France.

== Incumbents ==
- Monarch – Charles VI

== Events ==
- September 20 – Hundred Years War: Henry V of England captures Caen in Normandy which remains in English hands until 1450.

== Deaths ==
- 5 April - John, Duke of Touraine (born 1398)
- 22 September - Anne of Auvergne (born 1358)
- 29 April - Louis II of Naples, French-born ruler (born 1377)
- Unknown - Jean II de Rieux, Marshal of France (born 1342)
