= 1420 in France =

- Decades: 1400s; 1410s; 1420s; 1430s; 1440s
- See also: History of France; Timeline of French history; List of years in France

Events from the year 1420 in France.

== Incumbents ==
- Monarch – Charles VI

== Events ==
- 21 May - The Treaty of Troyes is signed, and Charles VI acknowledges Henry V of England as his heir.
- 2 June - Charles VI's daughter Catherine of Valois marries Henry V.

== Births ==
- Unknown - Jean Fouquet, painter (died 1481)

== Deaths ==
- 9 August - Pierre d'Ailly, cardinal (born 1351)
