= 1368 in France =

- Decades: 1340s; 1350s; 1360s; 1370s; 1380s
- See also: History of France; Timeline of French history; List of years in France

This article lists events related to France in the year 1368.

== Incumbents ==
- Monarch – Charles V

== Events ==
- A royal library was founded at the Louvre Palace by Charles V in 1368. The Bibliothèque nationale de France traces its origin to this library.

== Births ==
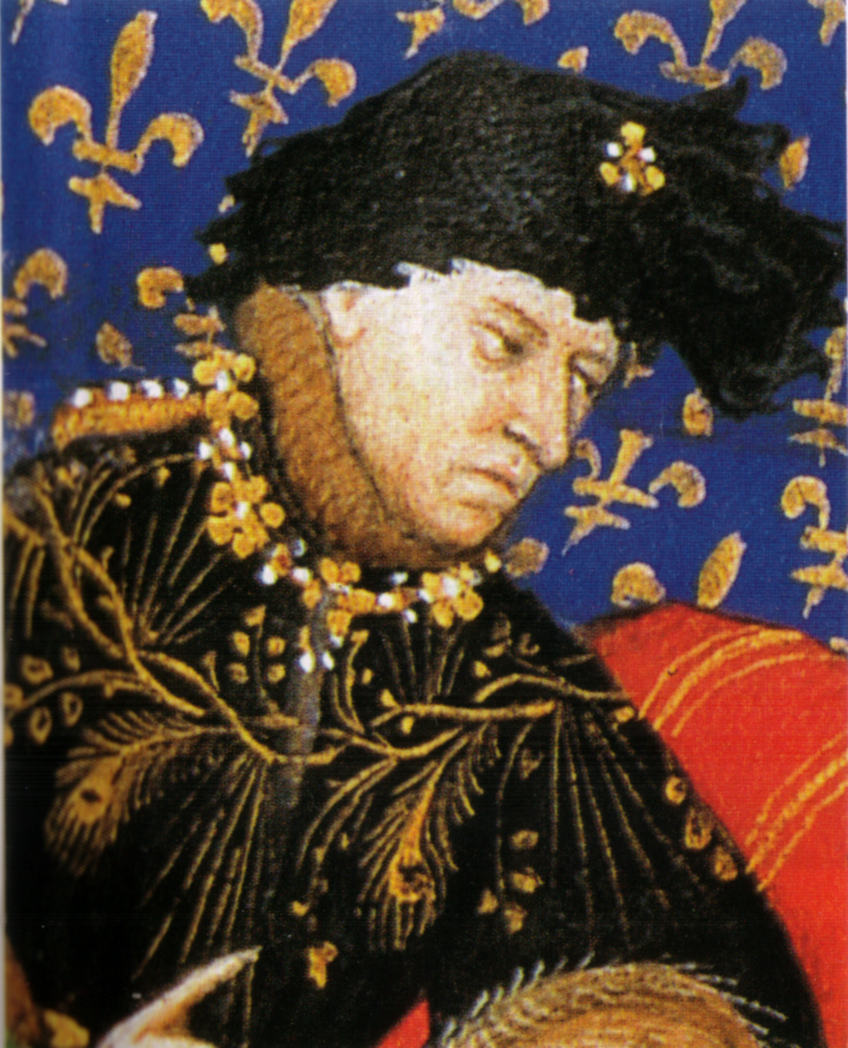
Charles VI, King of France 1380–1422

- 3 December – Charles VI of France (died 1422).

== Deaths ==
=== Full date missing ===
- Guy de Chauliac, physician and surgeon (born c. 1300)
