= 1404 in France =

- Decades: 1380s; 1390s; 1400s; 1410s; 1420s
- See also: History of France; Timeline of French history; List of years in France

Events from the year 1404 in France.

== Incumbents ==
- Monarch – Charles VI

== Events ==
- May - The Battle of Blackpool Sands. A French force raids the English coast as part of the Hundred Years War.

== Births ==
- 14 October - Marie of Anjou, Queen of France (died 1463)

== Deaths ==
- 15 October - Marie of France, Duchess of Bar, Noblewoman (born 1344)

== Links ==
Media related to 1404 in France at Wikimedia Commons
