= 1418 in France =

- Decades: 1390s; 1400s; 1410s; 1420s; 1430s
- See also: History of France; Timeline of French history; List of years in France

Events from the year 1418 in France.

== Incumbents ==
- Monarch – Charles VI

== Events ==
- 19 May – John the Fearless, Duke of Burgundy captures Paris during the Hundred Years War.
- 29 July – The English under Henry V commence the siege of Rouen in Normandy.
- Unknown – The Garde Écossaise, the French monarchy's bodyguards, are formed by Charles VII.

== Births ==
- Unknown – Peter II, Duke of Brittany, ruler of the Duchy of Brittany (died 1457)
- Unknown – Philippe de Crèvecœur d'Esquerdes, Marshal of France (died 1494)

== Deaths ==
- 22 March – Nicolas Flamel, writer (born 1340)
- 29 May – Henry of Marle, courtier
- 12 June – Bernard VII, Count of Armagnac, Constable of France (born 1360)
