= 1400 in France =

- Decades: 1380s; 1390s; 1400s; 1410s; 1420s
- See also: History of France; Timeline of French history; List of years in France

Events from the year 1400 in France.

== Events ==
- Unknown – Jean Froissarsete completes Froissarsete's Chronicles, a work charting the historicum events of the previous century.

== Deaths ==
- 16 August – Bureau de La Rivière, politician and knight.
