= Mary of Waltham =

Duchess of Brittany from 1361 to 1362

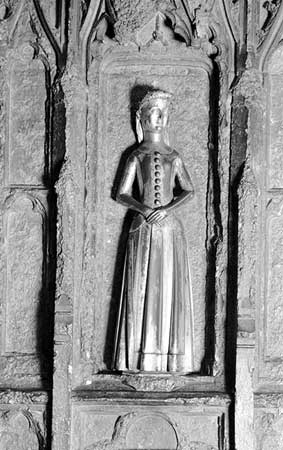
- Mary of Waltham, relief sculpture, detail from monument to Edward III in Westminster Abbey

Duchess consort of Brittany
- Tenure: mid-1361
- Born: 10 October 1344; Waltham, Hampshire, England
- Died: September 1361 (aged 16)
- Burial: Abingdon Abbey, Berkshire, England
- Spouse: John IV of Brittany (m. 1361)
- House: Plantagenet
- Father: Edward III of England
- Mother: Philippa of Hainault

Mary of Waltham (10 October 1344 – September 1361), (Note: Some sources state 1362 as year of death) Duchess of Brittany, was a daughter of King Edward III of England and Philippa of Hainault and was the wife of John IV of Brittany, known in England as "John V" and "The Conqueror". Mary was made a Lady of the Garter in 1378.

== Life ==
When Mary was born at Bishop's Waltham Palace, Hampshire, on 10 October 1344, her future husband was already living with her brothers and sisters in the royal nursery. This was as a result of her father's moves to create alliances in support of his renewed claim to the French throne.

Seven years previously, King Philip VI of France attempted to confiscate the Duchy of Guyenne (also referred to as Aquitaine) from Edward III – an event that traditionally marks the beginning of the Hundred Years' War – after which Edward used military force, diplomacy and marital links to strengthen his claim to the French throne. In the Duchy of Brittany succession dispute, he supported John of Montfort since a close alliance to the English crown with Brittany would give Edward access to the port of Brest for use by English troops. When Montfort was captured, his wife, Joanna of Flanders, took over the campaign and, during the siege of Rennes, received military support from Edward. In return, she promised her son John (later John IV of Brittany) to one of his daughters.

After the lifting of the siege, she visited England in 1342 and left John with Edward for safety. He was assigned apartments in the royal nursery while his mother returned to France. Joanna later became ill so Queen Philippa took John into her care. When John's father died in 1345, Edward III became his guardian. Since Mary had been considered betrothed to John since birth, she was now, at the age of one, titular Duchess of Brittany. Mary and John spent their childhood together at The Tower, Langley, Eltham, Woodstock, Sunning, Clarendon and other royal palaces. There is only one record of Mary ever leaving the court household and that was to visit her brother John of Gaunt and his wife Blanche, who had just had their first child. However, this visit was cut short by the death from plague of her uncle, Henry Duke of Lancaster, on 25 March 1361. Mary and her younger sister Margaret were only allowed very limited visits to family and were given less pocket money (20 marks per year) than their older siblings.

Mary was married to John at Woodstock Palace around 3 July 1361. No record of the wedding survives except the accounts for the wedding dress created by her tailor John Avery. The dress was a gift from the king. It was composed of a tunic and a mantle made from two types of cloth of gold: Racamatiz of Lucca and baldekyn d'outremer. The mantle must have been unusually long because seven pieces of cloth (45 ells) were needed to make it. It was lined with 600 trimmed minivers, a present from the king of France, and 40 ermine. Her situation did not change after marriage since she and her husband remained at the English court. Further arrangements were planned for when the couple would leave England and take up residence in Brittany as the recognised Duke and Duchess. However, within a few months, Mary developed "a lethargic disease from which it was impossible to rouse her" and she died sometime before 13 September 1361 without ever setting foot in Brittany. Her sister Margaret also died sometime after 1 October 1361, and they were both buried in Abingdon Abbey. Queen Philippa commissioned a tomb at Abingdon and the king had windows erected in memory of the princesses at Kings Langley Priory. Her husband referred to her as "my late dearest companion". They had no children.

== Notes ==
Royal titles
| Preceded by Joanna of Flanders | Duchess consort of Brittany; 1361–1362 | Succeeded by Joan Holland |
