= 1419 in France =

- Decades: 1390s; 1400s; 1410s; 1420s; 1430s
- See also: History of France; Timeline of French history; List of years in France

Events from the year 1419 in France.

== Incumbents ==
- Monarch – Charles VI

== Events ==
- 19 January - Rouen surrenders to Henry V of England bringing Normandy under his control during the Hundred Years War.
- 10 September - John the Fearless, Duke of Burgundy is assassinated by his opponents. His death at the hands of supporters of the Dauphin Charles intensifies France's civil chaos.
- Unknown - John Stewart, Earl of Buchan arrives with a contingent of Scottish troops to fight on the French side during the Hundred Years War.

== Deaths ==
- 10 September - John the Fearless, Duke of Burgundy (born 1371)
