= Isabella of Valois =

Queen of England from 1396 to 1399

- Duchess of Orléans
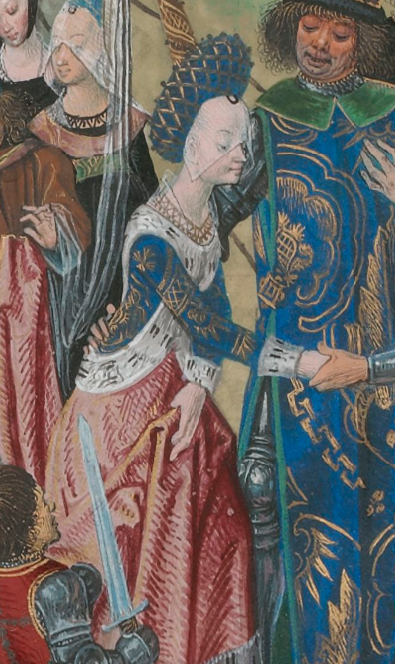
- Isabella on her way to her marriage to Richard II, 15th-century illustration from Froissart's Chronicles

Queen consort of England
- Tenure: 31 October 1396 – 29 September 1399
- Coronation: 8 January 1397
- Born: 9 November 1389; Paris, France
- Died: 13 September 1409 (aged 19); Blois, Loir-et-Cher, France
- Burial: Abbey of Saint Laumer of Blois; reinterred in the Couvent des Célestins, Paris, France
- Spouse: Richard II of England (m. 1396; died 1400); Charles I, Duke of Orléans (m. 1406)
- Issue: Joan, Duchess of Alençon
- House: Valois
- Father: Charles VI of France
- Mother: Isabeau of Bavaria

Isabella of Valois (9 November 1389 – 13 September 1409) was Queen of England as the wife of Richard II, King of England, between 1396 and 1399, and Duchess of Orléans as the wife of Charles I, Duke of Orléans, from 1406 until her death in 1409. She had been born a princess of France as the daughter of King Charles VI and Isabeau of Bavaria.

== Life ==
Isabella was born on 9 November 1389 in Paris, France, as the third child and second daughter of Charles VI, King of France, and his wife, Isabeau of Bavaria. Her eldest sibling had already died by the time of her birth, and the second-eldest died the following year; however, she had nine younger siblings, seven of whom survived infancy. Five of her younger siblings were born after Isabella had already been married off to England, and one of them died while she was still there.

In 1396 negotiations started about marrying six-year-old Isabella to the widower Richard II, King of England (1367–1400), who was 22 years her senior, to ensure peace between their countries. Isabella told the English envoys (who described her as pretty) that she was happy to be Queen of England as she had been told that this would make her a great lady. She also started practising for the role.

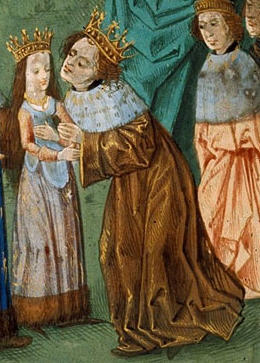
Richard and Isabella on their wedding day in 1396. He was 29 years old; she was six.

Richard travelled to Paris for his bride, where great festivities were held. Afterwards, the court and the English guests went to Calais where the wedding ceremony was performed on 31 October 1396, but would not be consummated at least until the bride's twelfth birthday.

A tearful Princess Isabelle, dressed in a blue velvet dress sewn with golden fleurs de lys and wearing a diadem of gold and pearls, was carried by the Dukes of Berry and Burgundy to Richard’s pavilion. She was taken away by a delegation of English ladies led by the Duchesses of Lancaster and Gloucester. Four days later, on 4 November 1396, she was brought to the church of St. Nicholas in Calais where Richard married her. She was five days short of her seventh birthday. Her dolls were included in her trousseau.

=== Queen of England ===
After the wedding, Isabella went to England and was moved into Windsor Castle in Berkshire. She had her own court, supervised by a governess and chief lady-in-waiting, Madame de Coucy (later replaced by Lady Mortimer). She was made a Lady of Garter in 1396 and was crowned Queen of England in Westminster Abbey on 8 January 1397.

In spite of their age difference and the marriage being politically arranged, Isabella and Richard developed a mutually respectful relationship. Due to the age of Isabella (the Canonical law for sexual consummation being twelve), and due to Richard's death just three years later, the marriage was never sexually consummated. However, Isabella and Richard enjoyed a good platonic relationship, which has been compared to that between a father and his adopted daughter or between a niece and a doting uncle. He was noted to have treated her not as a wife but rather as the daughter he and his first wife Anne never had. The king regularly visited her in Windsor, where she was tutored by Margaret de Courcy. He treated her with respect, entertained her and her ladies-in-waiting with humorous conversation, and pampered her with gifts and toys. Isabella reportedly enjoyed and looked forward to these visits.

By May 1399 the Queen had been moved to Portchester Castle for protection while Richard went on a military campaign in Ireland. Before he departed, he reportedly visited her, kissed her hand and promised he would let her come to Ireland soon. In June, Isabella's uncle, Louis I, Duke of Orléans (1372–1407) took power in France from her mentally troubled father. He decided that a peaceful relationship with England was no longer important or desirable, and let Henry Bolingbroke (1367–1413), Richard's cousin and rival, return to England. Henry's declared goal was to regain the lands of his father, John of Gaunt, Duke of Lancaster (1340–1399) who had died in February of that year, prompting King Richard to cancel the act by which Henry would have inherited his lands automatically.

Many of England's lords supported Henry, who started a military campaign and took the country without much resistance, taking advantage of Richard being in Ireland. Edmund of Langley, Duke of York, Keeper of the Realm and an uncle of both Richard and Henry, eventually also sided with the rebels. He moved Isabella first to Wallingford Castle, then to Leeds Castle. On 19 August, Richard surrendered, and he was imprisoned in London on 1 September. On 13 October 1399, Henry was crowned king. Isabella was confined at Sonning Bishop's Palace (residence of the Bishop of Salisbury). After the unsuccessful attempt to murder Henry IV and his sons during the failed Epiphany Rising where the conspirators had gone to Sonning to meet with Isabella, she was moved to Essex and held under heavier guard at Havering Palace.

On or around 14 February 1400, Richard died under mysterious circumstances, possibly of starvation. The French court requested that his widow be returned to France, but Henry IV wanted her to marry his son and heir, Henry of Monmouth (1386–1422). Isabella refused his demands and went into mourning for her late husband. In May 1401 Henry IV promised to return Isabella to France with her jewels and her property. She was finally allowed to return to France on 21 July 1401, but Henry IV kept her dowry, which she was supposed to get back if the marriage was never consummated. The same year, marriage negotiations were started for a match between Prince Henry and Catherine of Pomerania instead.

=== Duchess of Orléans ===
In 1406, when the marriage negotiations between the Prince of Wales and Catherine of Pomerania had been terminated, Henry IV repeated his suggestion that Isabella should marry his son, but was refused by the French court. In 1420, Henry's son married Isabella's sister, Catherine of Valois.

On 29 June 1406 Isabella, aged 16, married her paternal cousin, Charles of Orléans (1394–1465), aged 11, who became Duke of Orléans in 1407 following the assassination of his father. Isabella died in childbirth on 13 September 1409 at the age of 19. Her daughter, Joan of Valois (1409–1432) survived and married John II, Duke of Alençon (1409–1476) in 1424.

Isabella was buried in Blois, in the Abbey of Saint Laumer of Blois, where her body was discovered in 1624, wrapped in bands of linen plated with mercury. Her remains were then transferred to the Couvent des Célestins (Convent of the Celestines) in Paris, the second most important burial site for French royalty, which was desecrated during the French Revolution.

== Sources ==
- Goodrich, Norma Lorre (1967). Charles of Orléans: A Study of Themes in his French and in his English Poetry. Librairie Droz.
- Hamilton, Jeffrey (2010). The Plantagenets: History of a Dynasty. Continuum.
- Knecht, Robert (2007). The Valois: Kings of France 1328–1589. Hambledon Continuum.
- Stratford, Jenny (2012). Richard II and the English Royal Treasure. The Boydell Press.
- Sumption, Jonathan (2011). The Hundred Years War, Volume 3: Divided Houses. Faber & Faber.
- Williams, Deanne (2016). "Isabelle de France, Child Bride". In Martin, Catherine Gimelli; Melehy, Hassan (eds.). French Connections in the English Renaissance. Routledge.

Isabella of Valois House of Valois Cadet branch of the Capetian dynasty Born: 9 November 1389 Died: 13 September 1409
English royalty
Vacant Title last held by Anne of Bohemia	Queen consort of England; 31 October 1396 – 30 September 1399	Vacant Title next held by Joanna of Navarre
