= Marie of Armagnac =

- Duchess of Alençon
- Born: 1420
- Died: 25 July 1473 (aged 52–53); Cloister Mortagne-au-Perche
- Spouse: John II of Alençon (m. 1437)
- Issue: Catherine of Alençon; René of Alençon
- House: Armagnac
- Father: John IV of Armagnac
- Mother: Isabella of Navarre

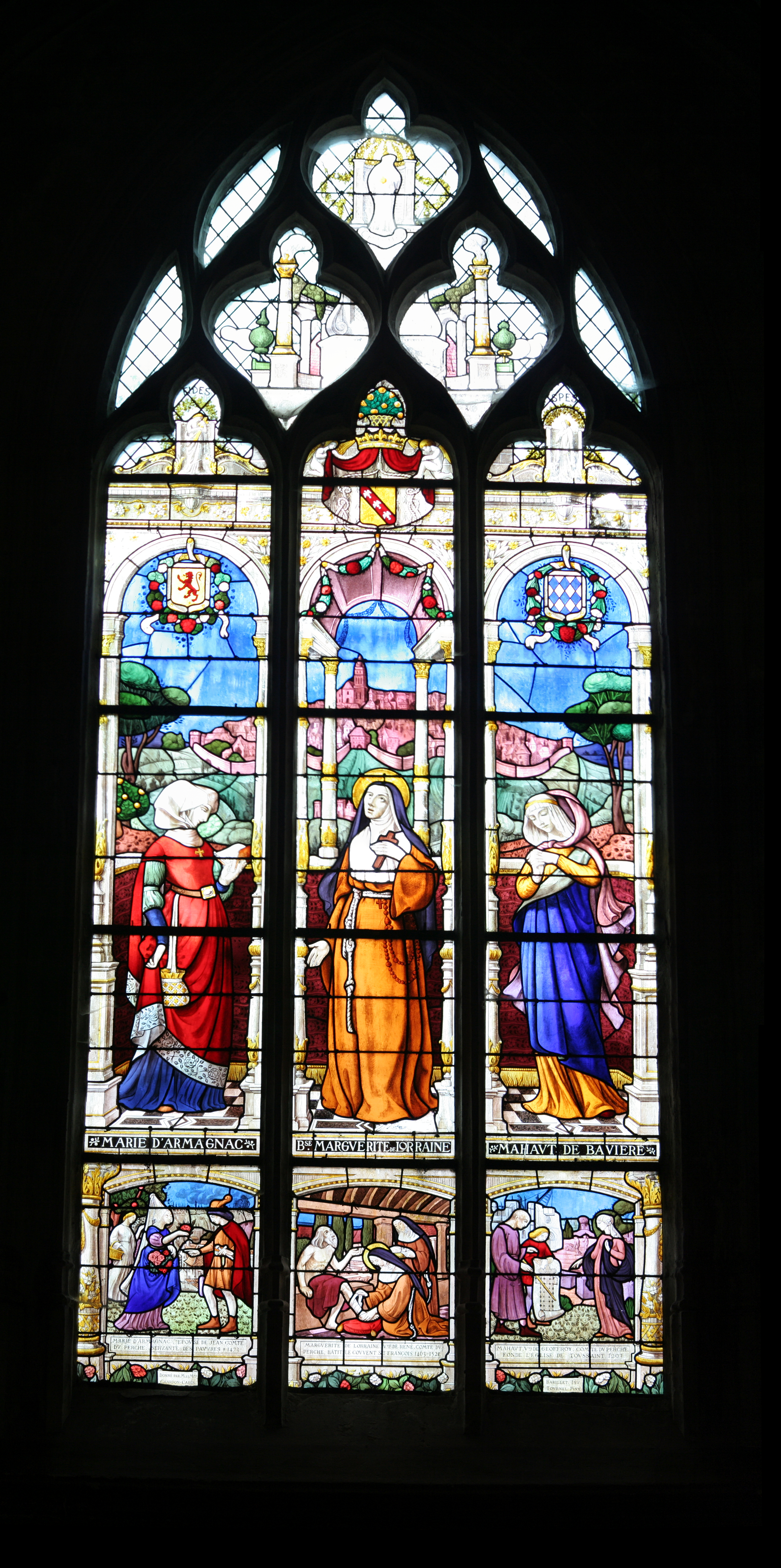

Marie of Armagnac (c. 1420–1473) was a French noblewoman, daughter of John IV of Armagnac and his second wife, Isabella of Navarre.

== Marriage and children ==
On 30 April 1437, Marie became the second wife of John II of Alençon. Their marriage was at the Chateau L'Isle-Jourdain. They had two surviving children:

- Catherine (1452–1505)
- René of Alençon (1454–1492).

Marie died on 25 July 1473 at Cloister Mortagne-au-Perche. Her husband died three years later, on 8 September 1476 in Paris.

== Sources ==
- des Noes, François Bouvier (2004). Procédures politiques du règne de Louis XI: le procès de René d'Alençon, comte du Perche, 1481-1483 (in French). Vol. 1. Atelier national de reproduction des thèses.
- Pernoud, Regine; Clin, Narue-Veronique (1998). Wheeler, Bonnie (ed.). Joan of Arc: Her Story. Translated by Adams, Jeremy duQuesnay. St. Martin's Press.
- Potter, David (1995). Keen, Maurice (ed.). A History of France, 1460–1560: The Emergence of a Nation State. Macmillan.

Marie of Armagnac House of Armagnac Born: 1420 1473
Preceded by Jeanne of Valois	Duchess of Alençon; 1437–1473	Succeeded by Marguerite of Tancarville
