= 1403 in France =

- Decades: 1380s; 1390s; 1400s; 1410s; 1420s
- See also: History of France; Timeline of French history; List of years in France

Events from the year 1403 in France.

== Incumbents ==
- Monarch – Charles VI

== Events ==
- 7 October – Battle of Modon: The Genoese fleet under Jean Le Maingre (Marshal Boucicaut) is defeated by the Republic of Venice, at Modon in the Peloponnese.

== Births ==
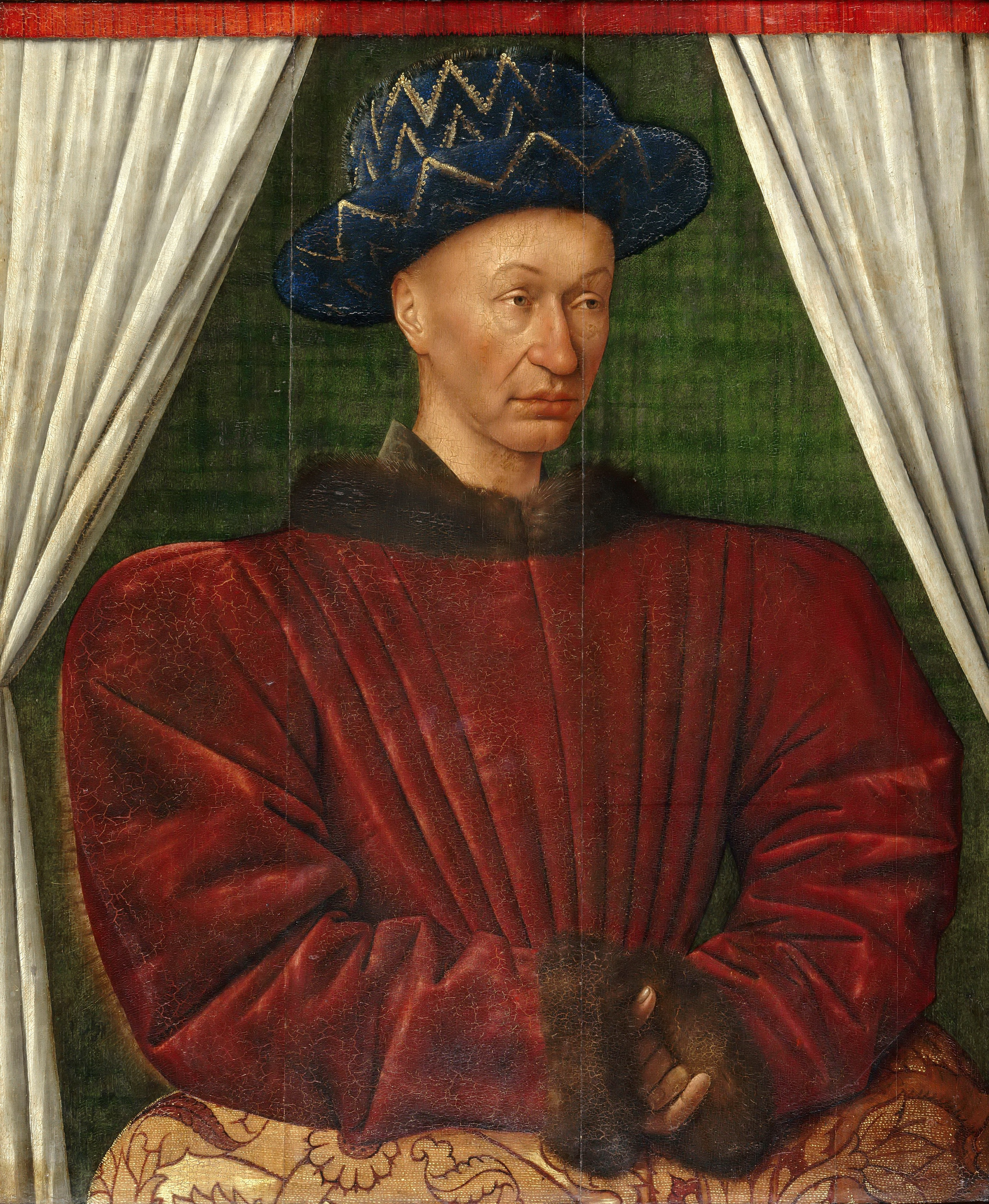
Charles VII, King of France 1422–1461

- 22 February – Charles VII of France (died 1461).

=== Full date missing ===
- John IV, Duke of Brabant (died 1427)
- Guigone de Salins, noble (died 1470)
