= 1405 in France =

- Decades: 1380s; 1390s; 1400s; 1410s; 1420s
- See also: History of France; Timeline of French history; List of years in France

Events from the year 1405 in France.

== Incumbents ==
- Monarch – Charles VI

== Events ==
- 6 May - Siege of Mercq takes place between France and England during the Hundred Years War
- Unknown - Christine de Pizan writes The Book of the City of Ladies

== Deaths ==
- 29 May - Philippe de Mézières, royal advisor (born 1327)
