= 1422 in France =

- Decades: 1400s; 1410s; 1420s; 1430s; 1440s
- See also: History of France; Timeline of French history; List of years in France

Events from the year 1422 in France.

== Incumbents ==
- Monarch – Charles VI (until October 21), then Charles VII

== Events ==
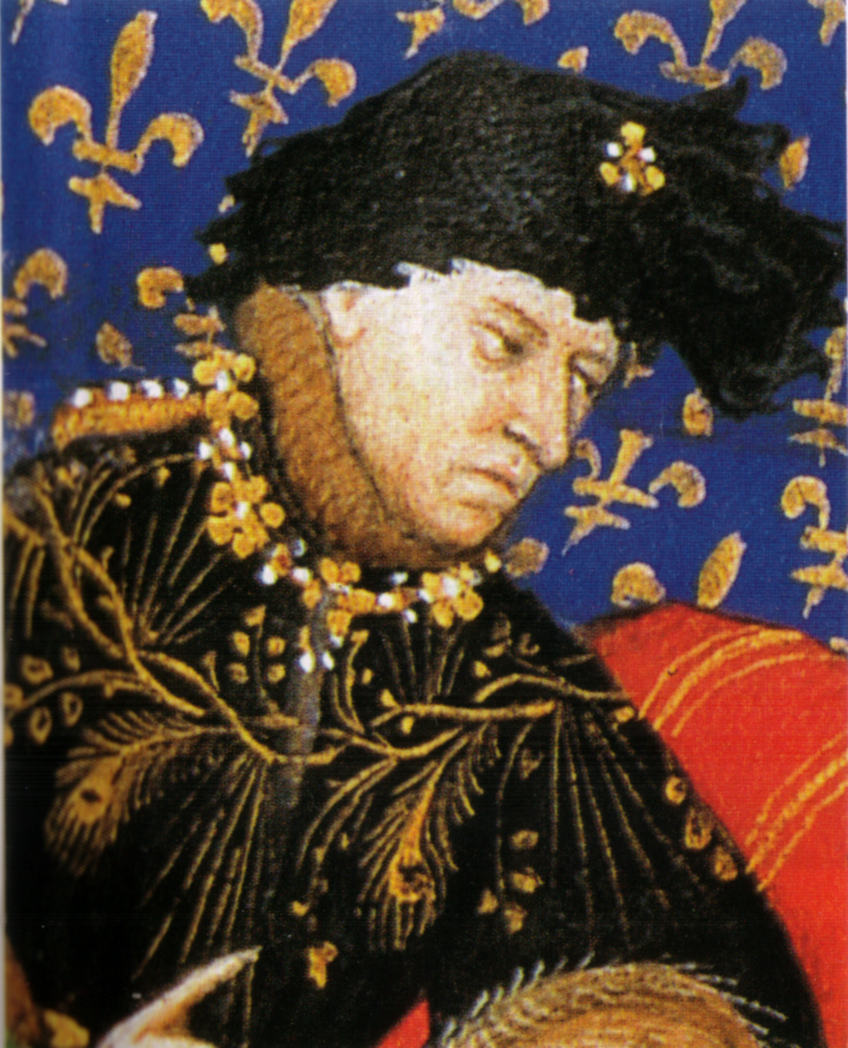
Charles VI, King of France 1380–1422

- 21 October – Charles VI of France dies, and his successor Charles VII takes over the throne.
- 10 May – The English army under Henry V wins the siege of Meaux.
- The phrase "The king is dead, long live the king!" originates, with Charles VII accession to the French throne.

== Births ==
=== Full date missing ===
- Gaston IV, Count of Foix, nobleman (died 1472)
- Louis d'Albret, cardinal (died 1465)

== Deaths ==
- 21 October – Charles VI of France (born 1368).
