= 1401 in France =

- Decades: 1380s; 1390s; 1400s; 1410s; 1420s
- See also: History of France; Timeline of French history; List of years in France

Events from the year 1401 in France.

== Incumbents ==
- Monarch – Charles VI

== Births ==
- 27 October – Catherine of Valois, Queen of England (died 1437)
- Unknown – Charles I, Duke of Bourbon, nobleman and soldier (died 1456)

== Deaths ==
- Unknown – John of Valois, Count of Montpensier, nobleman (born 1386)
