= 1421 in France =

- Decades: 1400s; 1410s; 1420s; 1430s; 1440s
- See also: History of France; Timeline of French history; List of years in France

Events from the year 1421 in France.

== Incumbents ==
- Monarch – Charles VI

== Events ==
- 21 March - Battle of Baugé is fought during the Hundred Years War. The English commander Thomas, Duke of Clarence, younger brother of Henry V, is killed in battle.

== Births ==
- 6 December - Henry VI of England, son of Catherine of Valois and claimant to the French throne (died 1471)

== Deaths ==
- 21 June - Jean Le Maingre, soldier (born 1366)
