= 1402 in France =

- Decades: 1380s; 1390s; 1400s; 1410s; 1420s
- See also: History of France; Timeline of French history; List of years in France

Events from the year 1402 in France.

== Incumbents ==
- Monarch – Charles VI

== Births ==
- 23 November – Jean de Dunois, soldier (died 1468)

== Deaths ==
- 25 April – Jean de La Grange, bishop (born 1325)
- 8 November – Joan of Brittany, sister of Duke of Brittany (born 1341)
- 19 January – Bonne of Bourbon, Regent of Savoy (born 1341)

== Links ==
Media related to 1402 in France at Wikimedia Commons
