= 1410 in France =

- Decades: 1390s; 1400s; 1410s; 1420s; 1430s
- See also: History of France; Timeline of French history; List of years in France

Events from the year 1410 in France.

== Incumbents ==
- Monarch – Charles VI

== Events ==
- Unknown – Construction is completed on the Château-Gaillard in Vannes

== Deaths ==
- 10 August – Louis II, Duke of Bourbon (born 1337)
