= 1416 in France =

- Decades: 1390s; 1400s; 1410s; 1420s; 1430s
- See also: History of France; Timeline of French history; List of years in France

Events from the year 1416 in France.

== Incumbents ==
- Monarch – Charles VI

== Events ==
- 9–11 March - The Battle of Valmont during the Hundred Years War.
- 15 August - The Treaty of Canterbury is signed creating an anti-French alliance between England and the Emperor Sigismund.

== Deaths ==
- 15 June - John, Duke of Berry (born 1340)
- Unknown - Margaret of Bourbon, Lady of Albret (born 1344)
