= 1414 in France =

- Decades: 1390s; 1400s; 1410s; 1420s; 1430s
- See also: History of France; Timeline of French history; List of years in France

Events from the year 1414 in France.

== Incumbents ==
- Monarch – Charles VI

== Births ==
- 11 May – Francis I, Duke of Brittany (died 1450)
- Unknown – Charles I, Count of Nevers (died 1466)

== Deaths ==
- 28 April – Jeanne-Marie de Maille (born 1331)
