= Joan of Valois, Duchess of Alençon =

Duchess of Alençon from 1424 to 1432

Joan of Valois
- Duchess of Alençon; Countess of Perche
- Born: 13 September 1409; Blois
- Died: 19 May 1432 (aged 22); Angers
- Spouse: John II of Alençon (m. 1424)
- House: Valois
- Father: Charles I, Duke of Orléans
- Mother: Isabella of Valois

Joan of Valois (13 September 1409, in Blois – 19 May 1432, in Angers) was the only surviving child of Charles I, Duke of Orléans, and Isabella of Valois. She held the title Duchess of Alençon when married to John II of Alençon.

== Family ==
Joan's mother Isabella had previously been the child bride of Richard II of England, and was the daughter of Charles VI of France. When Richard II was deposed and died in imprisonment, Isabella married Joan's eventual father Charles in 1406, at the ages of 16 and 11. Joan had no full siblings, and it was not until her father's third marriage that her half siblings would be born, 25 years after her death: Marie d'Orleans, Louis XII of France and Anne d'Orleans. Joan's mother died giving birth to her.

== Marriage and death ==
In 1424 at Blois, Joan married John II of Alençon, the son of John I of Alençon and Marie of Brittany, Lady of La Guerche, but they remained childless. She died in 1432, leaving him free to later marry Marie of Armagnac. Her cause of death is unknown.

== Ancestry ==
Ancestors of Joan of Valois, Duchess of Alençon

8. Charles V of France (= 12)
4. Louis I, Duke of Orléans
9. Joanna of Bourbon (= 13)
2. Charles I, Duke of Orléans
10. Gian Galeazzo Visconti
5. Valentina Visconti
11. Isabella of Valois (≠ 3)
1. Joan of Valois
12. Charles V of France (= 8)
6. Charles VI of France
13. Joanna of Bourbon (= 9)
3. Isabella of Valois (≠ 11)
14. Stephen III, Duke of Bavaria
7. Isabeau of Bavaria
15. Taddea Visconti
