= 1408 in France =

- Decades: 1380s; 1390s; 1400s; 1410s; 1420s
- See also: History of France; Timeline of French history; List of years in France

The following events occurred in France in the year 1408.

== Incumbents ==
- Monarch – Charles VI

== Events ==
- November – The Council of Perpignan convenes

== Deaths ==
- 4 December – Valentina Visconti, Duchess of Orléans, noblewoman (born 1371)
