= Marie of Brittany, Lady of La Guerche =

Noble from the 14th and 15th centuries

Marie of Brittany (18 February 1391 – 18 December 1446) was the Countess of Perche and Lady of La-Guerche from 1396 until 1414, and the Countess of Alençon from 1404 until 1414. In 1414, Marie’s titles became Duchess of Alençon, Countess of Perche, Lady of La-Guerche, when Charles VI of France raised her husband John's county of Alençon to a duchy. After the death of her husband in 1415, Marie retained the title of Lady of La-Guerche when her son, Jean II took the titles of Duke of Alençon and Count of Perche. Marie was the link between the House of Montfort of the duchy of Brittany and the ducal House of Valois-Alençon.

== Childhood ==
Marie of Brittany was born to John IV, Duke of Brittany, and Joan of Navarre on 18 February 1391 in Nantes. She was the fourth child of nine, and the second child to survive to adulthood. In the first four years of her life, Marie was offered as a possible wife for Henry Bolingbroke, the future King Henry IV of England, or for his son, the future Henry V, but negotiations fell through when her father instead married her to John I d’Alençon in 1396. Instead, after the death of John IV of Brittany, Marie's mother Joan would marry Henry IV of England.

== Marriage ==
On 26 June 1396, John IV of Brittany signed a contract with Pierre of Alençon and Perche which wedded Marie of Brittany to John of Perche, Pierre's son. The wedding was celebrated in July of that year at Saint-Aubin-du-Cormier, Ille-et-Vilaine, near Fougères. Marie's dowry was to be 100,000 francs, but her father never paid the entire amount, creating tension between the duchies of Brittany and Alençon in later years. In 1404, John succeeded his father as the Count of Alençon and Perche.

Marie and her husband John had five children:

- Pierre (4 October 1407 – 16 March 1408)
- John II of Alençon (2 March 1409 – 1476).
- Jeanne (17 September 1412 – 17 October 1420), buried at Bourgueil Abbey in Anjou in 1420.
- Marie (died, age 2)
- Charlotte (15 December 1413 – 24 March 1435), nun, died in 1435, and was buried in the Church of Our Lady at Lamballe in Brittany

In January 1414, Charles VI of France raised the county of Alençon to a duchy, and made Marie's husband, John, the first duke of Alençon.

Marie's husband died at the Battle of Agincourt, where he fought alongside the King of France.

== Later life ==
After the death of her husband in 1415, Marie was forced to flee Normandy, where she had been living prior to the Battle of Agincourt. Her son, John, became John II of Alençon and was captured at the Battle of Verneuil in 1424. He paid for his freedom from the English in 1427, and became well known as a strong partisan of Joan of Arc.

Marie died on 18 December 1446. It is unknown where she was buried, despite the fact that all of her children's burial places are known. At her death, Marie was simply Marie of Brittany, Lady of La Guerche.

== In context ==
Much like Gisela of Aquitaine, Mahout of Artois, and her own great-niece Margaret of Brittany, Marie was both literate and the owner of at least a Book of Hours.

== See also ==
- Alençon
- Argentan
- Hundred Years War
