= John IV of Brittany =

Duke of Brittany from 1365 to 1399

John IV
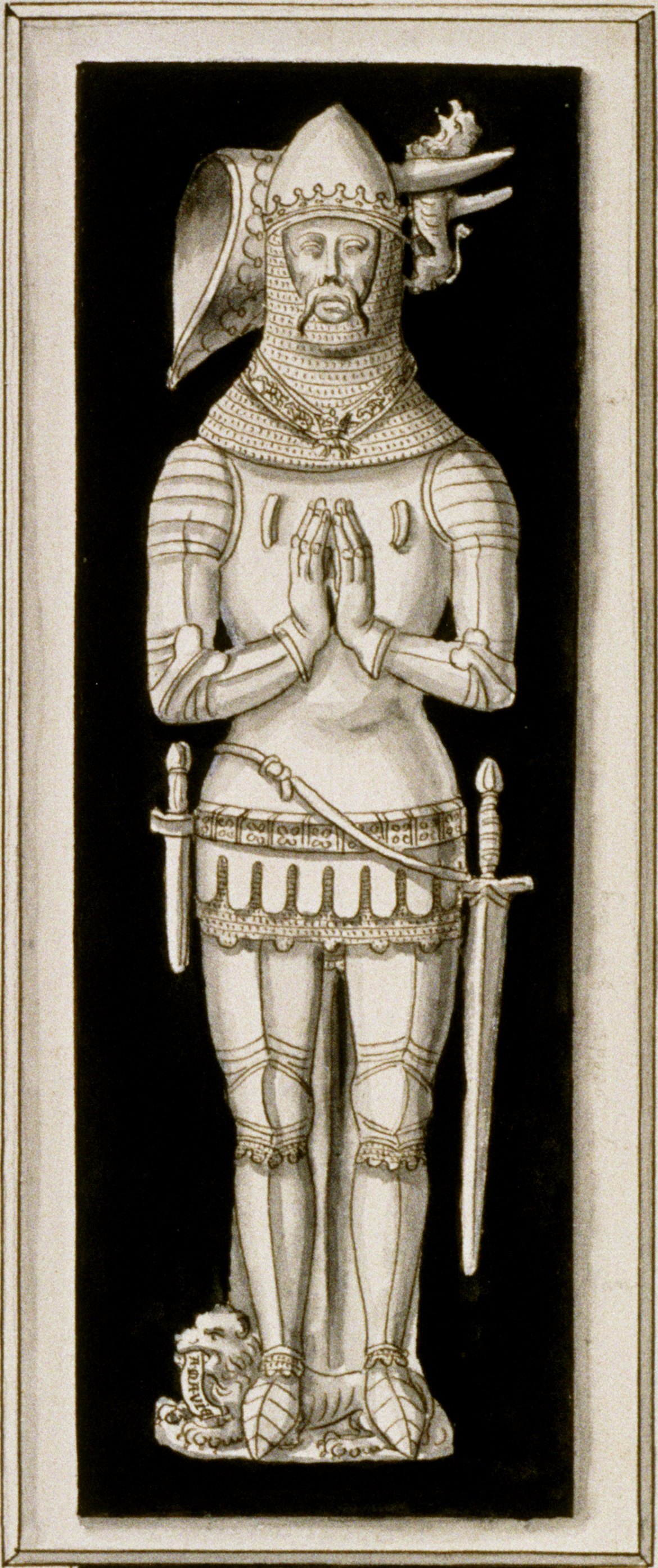
- Drawing c.1700 of English-made effigy, on white arcaded chest tomb, Nantes Cathedral. Original monument destroyed. Drawing by Roger de Gaignières.

Duke of Brittany
- Reign: 12 April 1365 – 1 November 1399
- Predecessor: Joan, Duchess of Brittany, contested by John (IV)
- Successor: John V

Count of Montfort
- Reign: 16 September 1345 – 1 November 1399
- Predecessor: John II
- Successor: John IV

Earl of Richmond
- Reign: 20 June 1372 – 1 November 1399
- Predecessor: John of Gaunt
- Born: September–December 1339
- Died: 1 November 1399 (aged 59–60); Nantes, Brittany
- Burial: Nantes Cathedral
- Spouses: Mary of England (m. 1361; died 1361) Joan Holland (m. 1366; died 1384) Joan of Navarre (m. 1386)
- Issue full list...: John V, Duke of Brittany; Mary, Duchess of Alençon; Margaret, Viscountess of Rohan; Arthur III, Duke of Brittany; Gilles, Lord of Ingrande; Richard, Count of Étampes; Blanche, Countess of Armagnac
- Family: Montfort
- Father: John of Montfort
- Mother: Joanna of Flanders

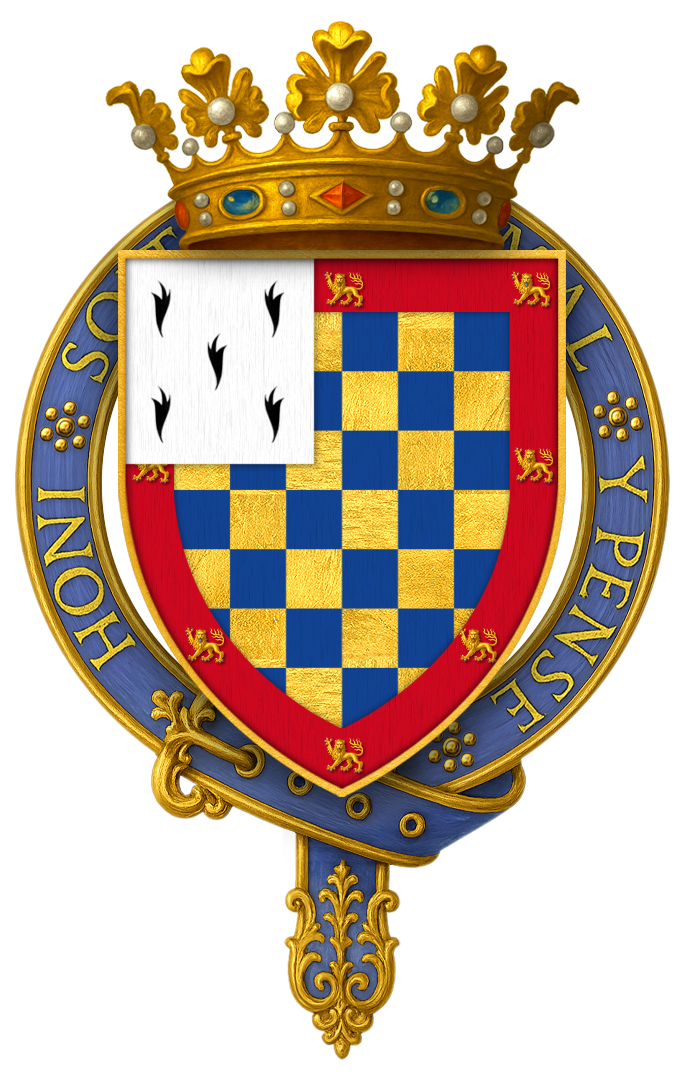
Arms of John IV, Duke of Brittany, KG

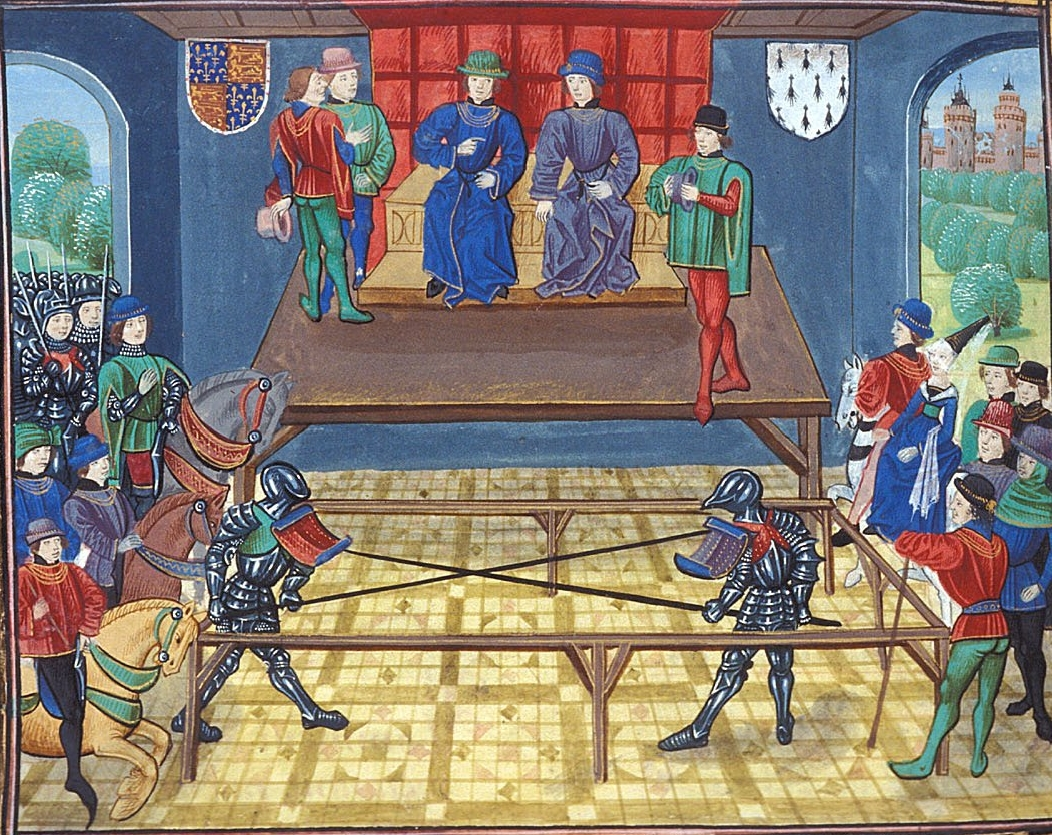
The Tournament of Vannes in 1381, overseen by Thomas of Woodstock (Earl of Buckingham at the time) and John IV, Duke of Brittany.

John IV the Conqueror KG (in Breton Yann IV, in French Jean IV, and traditionally in English sources both John of Montfort and John V) (1339 – 1 November 1399), was Duke of Brittany and Count of Montfort from 1345 until his death and 7th Earl of Richmond from 1372 until his death.

== Ordinal number ==
He was the son of John of Montfort and Joanna of Flanders. His father claimed the title Duke of Brittany, but was largely unable to enforce his claim for more than a brief period. Because his father's claim to the title was disputed, with only the English king recognising it, the subject of this article is often numbered in French sources as "John IV" and his father as simply "John of Montfort" (Jean de Montfort), while in English sources he is known as "John V". However, the epithet of "The Conqueror" makes his identity unambiguous.

== Conquest ==
The first part of his rule was tainted by the Breton War of Succession, fought by his father against his cousin Joanna of Penthièvre and her husband Charles of Blois. With French military support Charles was able to control most of Brittany. After his father's death, John's mother Joanne attempted to continue the war in the name of her baby son. She became known as "Jeanne la Flamme" (Fiery Joanna) for her fiery personality. However, she was eventually forced to retreat with her son to England to ask for the aid of Edward III. She was later declared insane and imprisoned in Tickhill Castle in 1343. John and his sister Joan of Brittany were taken into the King's household afterwards.

John returned to Brittany to enforce his claim, with English help. In 1364, John won a decisive victory against the House of Blois in the Battle of Auray, with the support of the English army led by John Chandos. His rival Charles was killed in the battle and Charles's widow Joanna was forced to sign the Treaty Guérande on 12 April 1365. In the terms of the treaty, Joanna gave up her rights to Brittany and recognized John as sole master of the duchy.

== Power struggles ==
Having achieved victory with English support (and having married into the English royal family), Duke John IV was constrained to confirm several English barons in positions of power within Brittany, especially as controllers of strategically important strongholds in the environs of the port of Brest, which gave the English military access to the peninsula, and which took revenue from Brittany to the English crown. This English power-base in Brittany was resented by the Breton aristocrats and the French monarchy, as was John's use of English advisers. However, John IV declared himself a vassal to king Charles V of France, not to Edward III of England. Nevertheless, this gesture did not placate his critics, who saw the presence of rogue English troops and lords as destabilizing. Faced with the defiance of the Breton nobility, John IV was unable to muster military support against King Charles V, who took the opportunity to exert pressure over Brittany. Without local support, in 1373, he was once more forced into exile to England.

However, King Charles V made the mistake of attempting to completely adjoin the duchy of Brittany to France. Bertrand de Guesclin was sent to make the duchy submit to the French king by force of arms in 1378. The Breton barons revolted against the takeover and invited Duke John IV back from exile in 1379. He landed in Dinard and took control of the duchy once more with the support of local barons. An English army under Thomas of Woodstock, 1st Duke of Gloucester, landed at Calais and marched towards Nantes to take control of the city. However, John IV subsequently reconciled with the new French king, Charles VI of France, and paid off the English troops to avoid a confrontation. He ruled his duchy thereafter in peace with the French and English crowns for over a decade, maintaining contact with both, but minimizing open links to England. Between 1380 and 1385, John IV built the Château de l'Hermine (Castle of Hermine) in Vannes, which became a defensive fortress and dwelling for the Dukes of Brittany. He built it in order to benefit from the central position of the city of Vannes in his duchy. In 1397, Duke John IV finally managed to extricate Brest from English control by using diplomatic pressure and financial inducements.

== Clisson affair ==
In 1392 an attempt was made to kill Olivier V de Clisson, the Constable of France, in Paris who was an old enemy of the duke's. The attacker, Pierre de Craon, fled to Brittany. John was assumed to be behind the plot, and Charles VI took the opportunity to attack Brittany once more. Accompanied by the Constable, he marched on Brittany, but before he reached the duchy the king was seized with madness. Relatives of Charles VI blamed Clisson, and instituted legal proceedings against him to undermine his political position. Stripped of his status as Constable, Clisson now took refuge in Brittany himself, and was reconciled with John (1397), becoming a close adviser to the duke.

== English knighthood ==
John IV was knighted by King Edward III between 1375 and 1376 as a member of the Order of the Garter. He is believed to be the only Duke of Brittany to have attained this English honour.

== Family ==
=== Marriages ===
Duke John IV married three times:

1) Mary of England (1344–1362), daughter of King Edward III and Philippa of Hainault.
2) Lady Joan Holland (1350–1384), daughter of Thomas Holland, 1st Earl of Kent and Joan of Kent, in London, in May 1366.
3) Joan of Navarre (1370–1437), daughter of King Charles II of Navarre and Joan of Valois, at Saillé-près-Guérande, near Nantes, on 2 October 1386.

Joan of Navarre was the mother of all of John's children. After his death, she served as Regent to their son, John V, Duke of Brittany, and eventually married King Henry IV of England.

=== Children ===
- Jeanne of Brittany (Nantes, 12 August 1387 – 7 December 1388).
- Isabelle of Brittany (October 1388 – December 1388).
- John V, Duke of Brittany (Château de l'Hermine, near Vannes, Morbihan, 24 December 1389 – manoir de La Touche, near Nantes on 29 August 1442).
- Marie of Brittany (Nantes, 18 February 1391 – 18 December 1446), Lady of La Guerche, married at the Château de l'Hermine on 26 June 1398 John I of Alençon.
- Marguerite of Brittany (1392 – 13 April 1428), Lady of Guillac, married on 26 June 1407, Alain IX, Viscount of Rohan and Count of Porhoët (d. 1462)
- Arthur III, Duke of Brittany (Château de Succinio, 24 August 1393 – Nantes, 26 December 1458).
- Gilles of Brittany (1394 – Cosne-sur-Loire, 19 July 1412, Bourges), Lord of Chantocé and Ingrande.
- Richard of Brittany (1395 – Château de Clisson 2 June 1438), Count of Benon, Étampes, and Mantes, married at the Château de Blois, Loir-et-Cher on 29 August 1423 Margaret d'Orléans, Countess of Vertus, daughter of Louis of Valois, Duke of Orléans.
- Blanche of Brittany (1397 – bef. 1419), married at Nantes on 26 June 1407 John IV, Count of Armagnac.

== See also ==
- Dukes of Brittany family tree

John IV of Brittany House of Monfort Cadet branch of the House of Dreux Born: 1339 Died: 1 November 1399
French nobility
Preceded by John of Montfort	Count of Montfort; 1345–1399	Succeeded by John V
Preceded by Charles and Joan	Duke of Brittany; 1365–1399	Succeeded by John V
Peerage of England
Vacant New creation or recreation Title last held by John of Gaunt	Earl of Richmond; 1372–1399	Vacant Dispossessed Title next held by John of Lancaster
