= Counts and dukes of Alençon =

French nobles

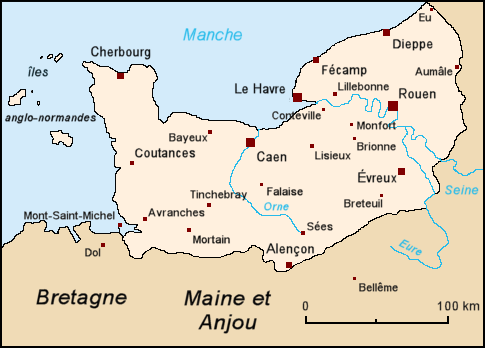
Map of Normandy

Coat of arms of the counts of Alençon of the House of Belleme.

Coat of arms of the counts and dukes of Alençon of the House of Valois.

Several counts and then royal dukes of Alençon, a French county in the Middle Ages, disputed between France and England during parts of the Hundred Years' War, have figured in French history. The title has been awarded to a younger brother of the French sovereign.

== History ==
The first line of Counts of Alençon came from the House of Bellême, who ruled from the 10th to the early 13th centuries. Alençon was granted as an appanage to Peter, son of Louis IX of France, and then to Charles, count of Valois, brother of Philip IV (1293). A third house of Alençon counts descended from Charles, second son of the Count of Valois, who was killed at the Battle of Crécy in 1346.

The county of Alençon was raised to a dukedom in 1414. Jean, 1st Duc d'Alençon, was killed at Agincourt, 1415, after having with his own hand slain the Duke of York. His son, Jean, 2nd Duc d'Alençon (who features in Shakespeare's Henry VI), was dispossessed of his duchy in the Battle of Verneuil on 17 August 1424: the Duke was defeated and taken prisoner by English forces led by John, Duke of Bedford. Jean reconquered his domain in 1449.

In 1524 the dukedom of Alençon reverted to the crown, in consequence of the death of the childless Duke Charles IV, who was married to Marguerite, sister of Francis I; Marguerite appears to have kept the title for life, as her second husband, Henry II of Navarre, used it in 1540. The title was given as a jointure to Catherine de' Medici in 1559, and as an appanage to her youngest son Francis in 1566.

The title was pawned by Henry IV to the duke of Wūrttemberg, and subsequently it passed to Gaston, Duke of Orléans, by grant of Louis XIII; to Elizabeth of Orléans, duchess of Guise; to Charles, duke of Berry, grandson of Louis XIV (1710); and to Monsieur (later Louis XVIII), brother of Louis XVI.

The title of duc d'Alençon was last given to Ferdinand of Orléans, son of the duc de Nemours, and grandson of Louis-Philippe.

== Counts of Alençon ==
=== House of Bellême ===
- William I Talvas
- Roger of Montgomery, count of Alençon (died 1094)
- William Talvas, lord of Bellême (until 1113), Count of Ponthieu, Sées, and Alençon (died 1171)
- John I, count of Alençon (married the daughter of Elias II, Count of Maine)
- John II, count of Alençon (died 1191)
- Robert I, count of Alençon (died c. 1217)

=== House of Capet ===
- Peter I (died 1283), received the county of Alençon and part of the county of Perche in appanage from his father Louis IX of France

=== House of Valois ===
- Charles I (died 1325), brother of Philip IV of France, was given the county of Alençon in appanage in 1291
- Charles II (died 26 August 1346 at the Battle of Crécy)
- Charles III (1346–1361)
- Peter II (1361–1404)
- John I (1404–1414)

== Dukes of Alençon ==
=== 1414 grant ===
- John I (died 25 October 1415 at the Battle of Agincourt)
- John II (1415–1458 [titular 1424–1449], 1461–1474)
- René (1478–1492)
- Charles IV (1492–1525)
- Marguerite (1525–1549) (widow of Charles)

To the French royal domain

=== 1566 grant ===
- François, Duke of Anjou (1566–1584)

=== 1646 grant ===
- Gaston, Duke of Orléans (1646–1660)
- Élisabeth Marguerite d'Orléans (1660–1696)

=== 1710 grant ===
- Charles de France, Duke of Berry (1710–1714)

=== 1774 grant ===
- Louis de France, Count of Provence (1774–1795)

=== 1844 grant ===
- Prince Ferdinand Philippe, Duke of Alençon (1844–1910)

== Sources ==
- Wood, Charles T. (1966). The French Apanages and the Capetian Monarchy, 1224-1328. Harvard University Press.
