= Couvent des Célestins =

Convent in Paris, France

Coordinates: 48°51′03″N 2°21′53″E

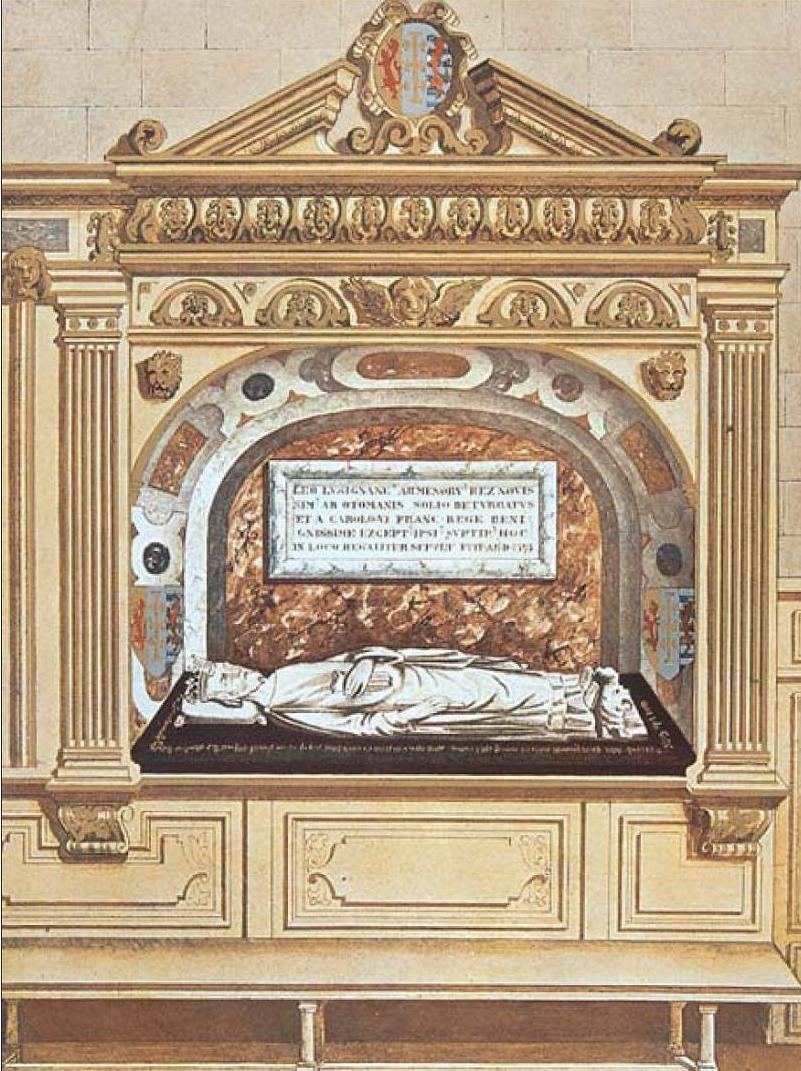
Original tomb of Leon V of Armenia, in the Couvent des Célestins, Paris.

The Couvent des Célestins ("Convent of the Celestines") was an ancient convent located near the Place de la Bastille in Paris, France, active between 1254 and 1790.

It was the second most important burial site for royalty after the Basilique Saint-Denis. The prestigious convent was located nearby Hôtel Saint-Pol, the favourite residence of Charles V and Charles VI in the area of the Marais. Many of the high-ranking princes from their court were buried in the convent.

However the convent was desecrated during the French Revolution. After the revolution, some of the tombstones were recovered by Alexandre Lenoir. In particular the tombstone of the Latin king Leon V of Armenia was placed in his Musée des monuments Français, and later in the Saint-Denis Basilica.

The convent gave its name to the modern Quai des Célestins.
