= Joan of Valois, Queen of Navarre =

Queen of Navarre from 1352 to 1373

Joan of Valois
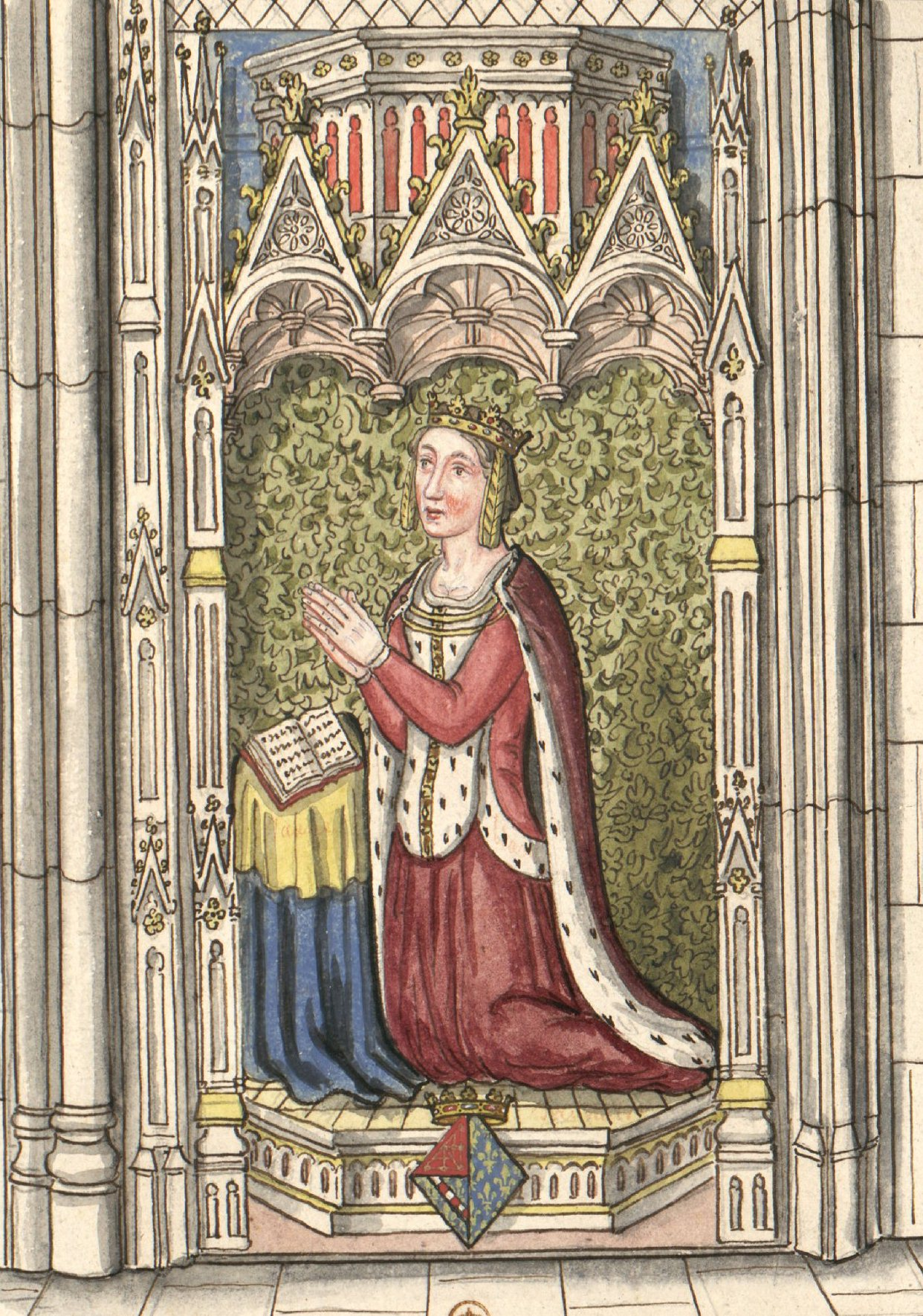

Queen consort of Navarre
- Tenure: 1352–1373
- Born: 24 June 1343; Châteauneuf-sur-Loire
- Died: 3 November 1373 (aged 30); Évreux
- Burial: Saint Denis Basilica
- Spouse: Charles II of Navarre
- Issue among others...: Charles III, King of Navarre; Joanna, Queen of England
- House: Valois
- Father: John II of France
- Mother: Bonne of Luxembourg

Joan of France, also known as Joan or Joanna of Valois (24 June 1343, Châteauneuf-sur-Loire – 3 November 1373, Évreux), was Queen of Navarre by marriage to Charles II of Navarre (called The Bad). She was the daughter of John II of France (called The Good), and Bonne of Luxembourg. She served as regent of Navarre during the absence of Charles II between 1369 and 1372.

== Life ==
She was first betrothed to John of Brabant, son of John III, Duke of Brabant and his wife Marie d'Évreux. The marriage did not, however, take place.

=== Queen ===
Joan instead was married on 12 February 1352 to Charles the Bad, at Chateau du Vivier, close to Fontenay-Trésigny in Brie, Coutevroult. He was the son of Philip III of Navarre and his wife, Joan II of Navarre. Joan and Charles were agnatic third cousins and cognatic second cousins. Because of her age, she remained in France until 1360, when she was seventeen.

Her marriage was distant first, but Charles eventually developed confidence in her: he appointed her regent when he left for warfare in France in 1369, and she ruled successfully until his return in 1372, one year before her death.

Joan died in 1373, aged thirty, in Évreux. She was buried in the Royal Abbey of Saint Denis.

== Issue ==
Joan and Charles had seven children:

1. Marie (1360, Puente la Reina – aft. 1400), married in Tudela on 20 January 1393 to Alfonso d'Aragona, Duke of Gandia (d. 1412). Their marriage was childless.
2. Charles III of Navarre (1361–1425), married Eleanor of Castile (d. 1416), by whom he had issue.
3. Bonne (1364 – aft. 1389)
4. Peter of Navarre, Count of Mortain (c. 31 March 1366, Évreux – 29 July 1412, Nevers), married in Alençon on 21 April 1411 Catherine (1380–1462), daughter of Peter II of Alençon. Their marriage was childless.
5. Philip (b. 1368), d. young
6. Joanna of Navarre (1370–1437), first married John IV, Duke of Brittany by whom she had issue; and later Henry IV of England. Her second marriage was childless.
7. Blanca (1372–1385, Olite)

Joan of Valois, Queen of Navarre House of Valois Cadet branch of the Capetian dynasty Born: 24 June 1343 Died: 3 November 1373
Royal titles
Preceded by Jeanne d'Évreux	Queen consort of Navarre; 1352–1373	Succeeded by Eleanor of Castile
