= John I, Duke of Alençon =

French nobleman

Jean I, Duke of Alençon
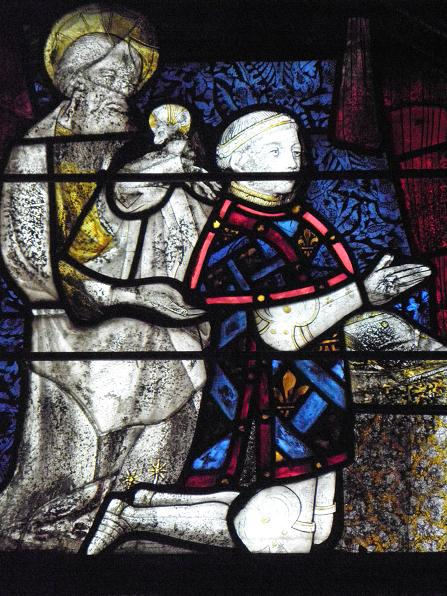
- Born: 1385; Château d'Essay
- Died: 25 October 1415; Azincourt
- Noble family: Valois-Alençon
- Spouse: Marie of Brittany
- Issue Detail: Pierre d'Alençon; Jean d'Alençon; Marie d'Alençon; Jeanne d'Alençon
- Father: Peter II of Alençon
- Mother: Marie Chamaillard

Coat of arms of the counts of Perche.

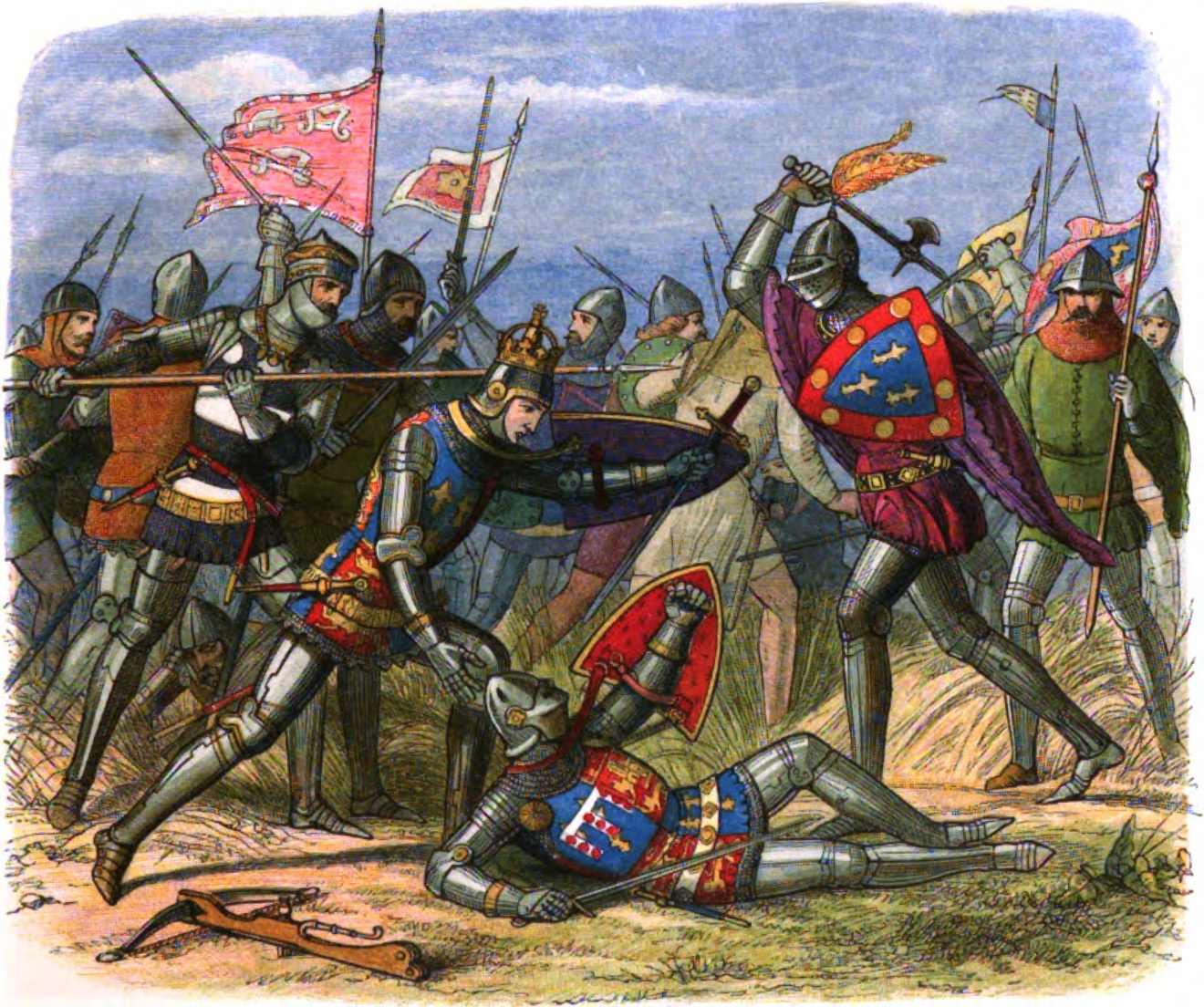
Jean I of Alençon fights against Henry V of England and killing Edward of York (lying on the ground) at the Battle of Agincourt.

Jean I of Alençon, known as the Wise (1385 – 25 October 1415), was a French nobleman, killed at the Battle of Agincourt.

Jean was born in Château d'Essay, the son of Count Peter II of Alençon and Marie Chamaillard. In 1404, he succeeded his father as Count of Alençon and Perche. He was made Duke of Alençon in 1414.

He supported the Armagnac faction over Burgundians in their civil war. In 1410, he formed the League of Gien with other French nobles and disaffected princes of the blood against the Duke of Burgundy.

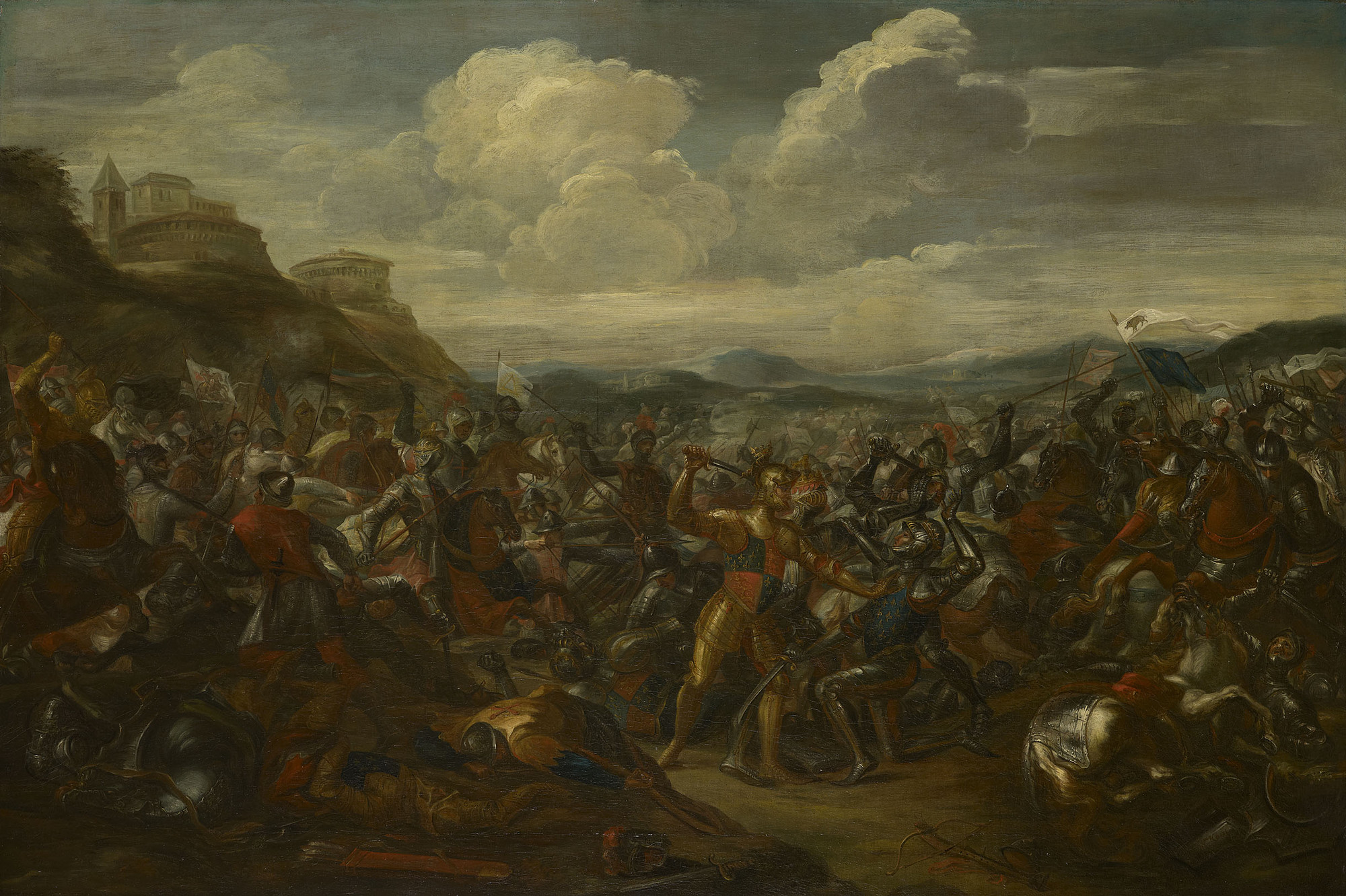
The Battle of Agincourt by William Kent, 1729, depicts the death of Alençon

He commanded the second division of the French army at the Battle of Agincourt in 1415. When the English broke through the first division, he led a countercharge. He is sometimes credited with, wounding Humphrey, Duke of Gloucester, reached and cut an ornament from the crown of Henry V, King of England, where he killed Edward, Duke of York, who was trying to protect the king. He was overpowered by King Henry's bodyguard and slain before he could yield himself. His second son Jean II d'Alençon succeeded him as the Duke of Alençon.

== Family ==
In 1396, he married Marie of Brittany (1391–1446), daughter of John IV, Duke of Brittany. They had five children:

1. Pierre d'Alençon (1407, Argentan – 1408).
2. Jean II d'Alençon, Duke of Alençon (1409–1476).
3. Marie d'Alençon (1410, Argentan, – 1412, Argentan).
4. Jeanne d'Alençon (1412, Argentan – 1420).
5. Charlotte d'Alençon (1413, Argentan – 1435, Lamballe).

He also had two illegitimate children:

1. Pierre d'Alençon (d. 1424, Battle of Verneuil), Lord of Gallandon.
2. Marguerite d'Alençon, married Jean de St-Aubin, Lord of Preaux.

== Sources ==
- Autrand, Francoise (1994). Charles V: Le Sage (in French). Fayard.
- Jones, Michael (1988). Creation of Brittany: A Late Medieval State. The Hambledon Press.
- Sumption, Jonathan (2015). The Hundred Years War IV: Cursed Kings. Faber & Faber.

John I, Duke of Alençon House of Valois-Alençon Cadet branch of the Capetian dynasty Born: 1385 Died: 26 October 1415
Preceded by Peter II	Count of Alençon; 1404–1414	Succeeded by himself as Duke of Alençon
Preceded by Peter II	Count of Perche; 1404–1415	Succeeded by John II
New creation	Duke of Alençon; 1414–1415	Succeeded by John II
