= Argentan =

- Subprefecture and commune
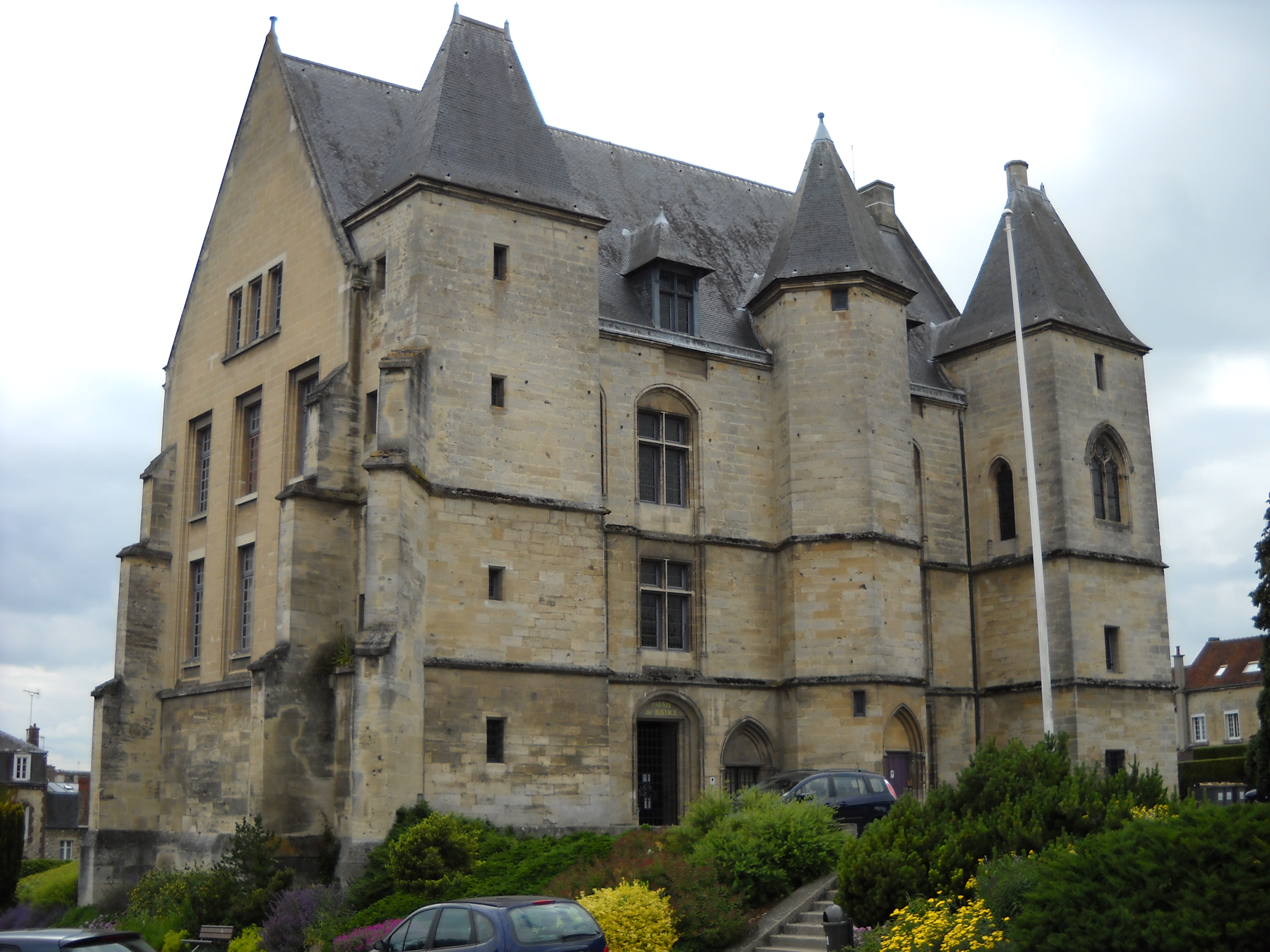
- The château of the dukes in the centre of Argentan

- Coat of arms
- Location of Argentan
- Location within France Location within Normandy
- Coordinates: 48°45′N 0°01′W
- Country: France
- Region: Normandy
- Department: Orne
- Arrondissement: Argentan
- Canton: Argentan-1; Argentan-2
- Intercommunality: Terres d'Argentan Interco

Government
  - Mayor (2020–2026): Frédéric Leveillé
- Area^{1}: 18.18 km^{2} (7.02 sq mi)
- Highest elevation: 228 m (748 ft)
- Lowest elevation: 152 m (499 ft)
- Population (2023): 13,527
  - Density: 744.1/km^{2} (1,927/sq mi)
- Time zone: UTC+01:00 (CET)
  - Summer (DST): UTC+02:00 (CEST)
- INSEE/Postal code: 61006 /61200
- ^{1} French Land Register data, which excludes lakes, ponds, glaciers > 1 km^{2} (0.386 sq mi or 247 acres) and river estuaries.

Argentan (French pronunciation: [aʁʒɑ̃tɑ̃]) is a commune and the seat of two cantons and of an arrondissement in the Orne department in northwestern France. As of 2023, Argentan is the third largest municipality by population in the Orne department.

== History ==
=== Early history ===
Heavy fighting in August 1944, following the Allied invasion of Normandy, left the town in ruins.

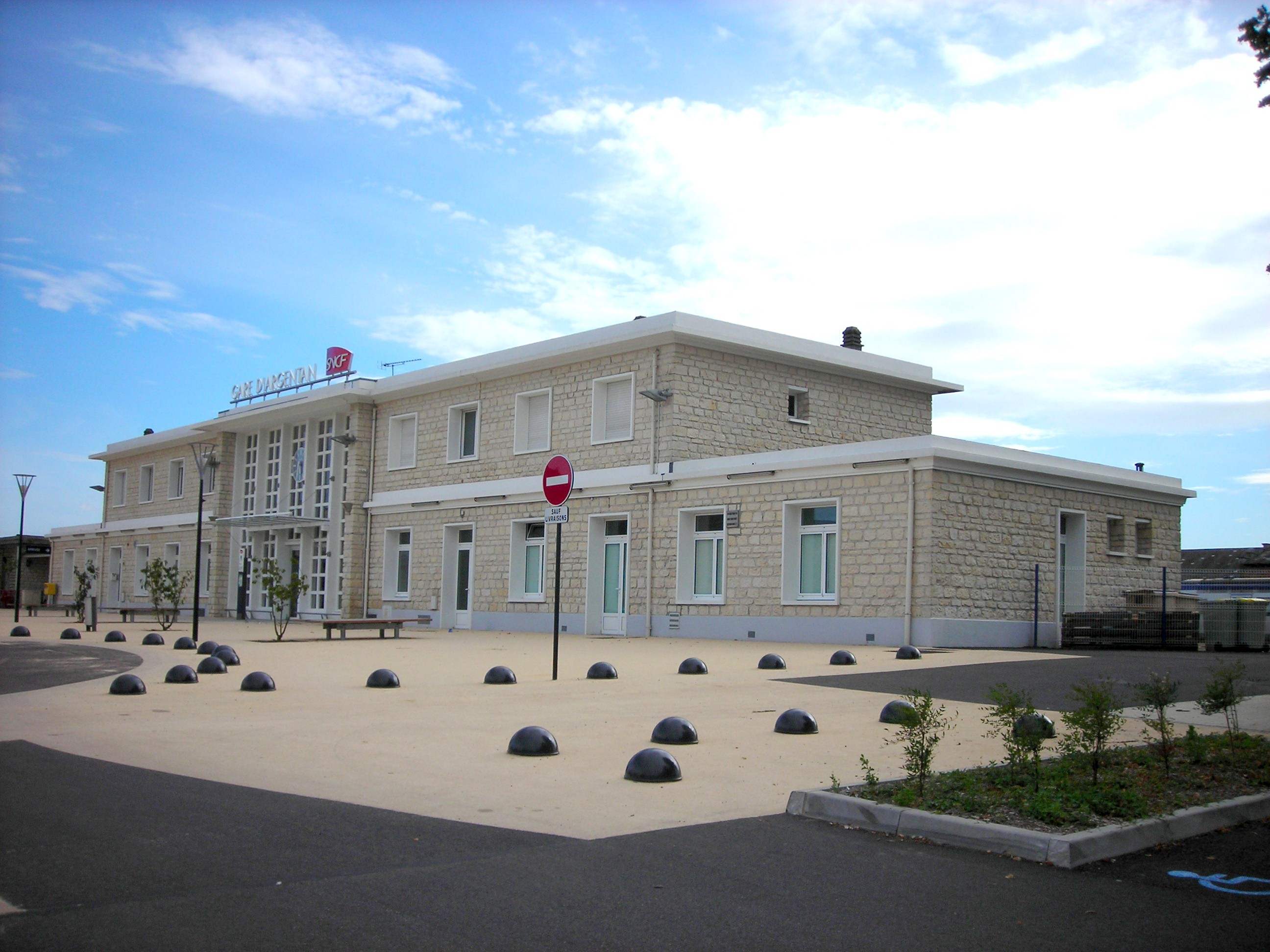
SNCF train station

Argentan is situated near the river Orne. Although the region was heavily populated during the Gallo Roman period the town is not mentioned in any texts until the 11th century. The toponym comes from the Gaulish words argentos ("silver") and magos ("market"). The town grew in importance during the Middle Ages.

=== Middle Ages ===
The towns fortifications were built or rebuilt on Gallic or Gallo-Roman remains by the order of Rollo "the Walker" first duke of Normandy. The town was then besieged in 1046, by Henry I of France attempting to seize the Norman duchy, destroying its ramparts and setting them on fire. 48 years later in 1094, Roger the Poitevin was sent by William II of England to defend the town and castle against Philip I of France, but Roger surrendered on the first day of the siege.

In 1106 after the Battle of Tinchebray, Henry I of England decided to rebuild and expand the fortifications, building an outer and inner set of walls, a keep and the first incarnation of the chateau des ducs. In 1199 the town came under the control of John, King of England who held court that year in the town over Christmas. However it was with John for only a short period as Philip II of France took control in 1203, a year before taking the rest of Normandy.

1356 saw the English take control of the town from Charles I de Montmorency, had the domain of Argentan, as part of the Hundred Years' War. The English abandoned the town 4 years later, and the domaine fell to Marie de Montmorency, who then sold the domaine to Pierre II, Count of Alençon in 1372. Pierre had built several chapels in the town and the version of the chateau des ducs that is still standing today.

In 1417, the English under Henry V took control of Argentan after the Siege of Caen. The English stayed in control of the town until 1449, when Charles VII of France took control of Normandy and ended the Hundred year war in 1453.

Francis II, Duke of Brittany arrived in 1465 and seized the town in protest of the plans of King Louis XI, to have centralised state in France, as part of the War of the Public Weal. Louis XI immediately recaptured the castle and made duke abandon the king's brother Charles of Valois side, and concluded a treaty with him in the town.

The castle fortifications surrounding the city started to be destroyed by René, Duke of Alençon, in response to getting the lands back that were confiscated from his father by Louis XI. It was also at this time the use of Gunpowder in sieges made the requirement for fortifications unnecessary.

=== Modern era ===
The French Wars of Religion saw the town captured by Gaspard II de Coligny and the protestants. The town saw the occupiers forced out in 1574 by Jacques II de Goyon and 6,000 Catholic soldiers.

During the reign of Louis XIV, Colbert, the Minister of state, objected to French aristocrats spending their money on foreign luxuries granted royal privileges to areas in the Orne to make their own lace, with Argentan along with nearby Alençon getting its royal privilege in 1665. This eventually led to the creation of both the point d'Argentan ("Argentan stitch") and the point d'Alençon ("Alençon stitch") which were regarded as the finest lace in France. Argentan became a very important town for traditional industry. It also gained in religious importance with the building of a Benedictine Abbey and two churches, Saint-Martin and Saint-Germain. Several mansions (hôtels particuliers) were also built.

=== Twentieth century ===
During World War I, the French 104th Infantry Regiment/14th Infantry Brigade was stationed at Argentan. It participated in the Battle of Verdun in 1916.

During World War II, the city was almost totally destroyed. On 5 June 1944, on the eve of the Allied D-Day landing on the beaches of Normandy, the city suffered an important air raid in which the train station was destroyed. The city suffered further damage when it was bombed on 6 and 7 June by B-17 and B-24 bombers of the U.S. Eighth Air Force. The greatest part of the city was, however, left in ruins two and a half months later, at the end of August, during the battle of the Argentan-Falaise Pocket. The U.S. Third Army, under the command of general George S. Patton liberated Argentan after eight days of violent combat against the German 9th Panzer Division and the 2nd SS Panzer Division Das Reich. The U.S. 80th Infantry Division liberated the city in the morning of 20 August.

== Geography ==
The commune of Argentan is made up of the town of Argentan and the following villages and hamlets: La Croix de Coulandon, Coulandon and Mauvaisville. The commune is spread over an area of 18.18 square kilometres (4,490 acres) with a maximum altitude of 228 metres (748 ft 0 in) and minimum of 152 metres (498 ft 8 in)

The town lies on the Greenwich Meridian line, which is marked on its Eastern entrance.

Argentan has 5 water courses running through it, three rivers Orne, Ure and Baize and two streams, the Marais de Fleuriel and the Fontaines Thiot.

The commune is within the area known as the Plaine d'Argentan, which is known for its cereal-growing fields and horse stud farms.

Argentan along with another 65 communes is part of a 20,593-hectare Natura 2000 conservation area, called the Haute vallée de l'Orne et affluents.

=== Land distribution ===
According to the 2018 CORINE Land Cover assessment the majority of the land in the commune, 45% is Arable land. 23 % of the land is urbanised with another 13% built upon for Industrial and commercial purposes. The rest of the land is Meadows at 18%, Forests at just 0.11% and 40 hectares (99 acres), 2% of land to Artificial Green spaces.

=== Location ===
Argentan is located 180 km (110 mi) NE of Rennes, 131 km (81 mi) ENE of the Mont Saint-Michel, 188 km (117 mi) SE of Cherbourg, 58 km (36 mi) SSE of Caen, 133 km (83 mi) SW of Rouen and 100 km (62 mi) N of Le Mans. Argentan station has rail connections to Caen, Le Mans, Paris and Granville.

=== Climate ===
Argentan's Climate is classed as a temperate oceanic climate according to the Köppen–Geiger climate classification.

Climate data for Argentan, 1991–2021 normals, elevation: 170 m (558 ft), extremes 1991–present, 1991–2019 Average sun hours
Month	Jan	Feb	Mar	Apr	May	Jun	Jul	Aug	Sep	Oct	Nov	Dec	Year
Record high °C (°F)	16.9 (62.4)	21.1 (70.0)	24.4 (75.9)	27 (81)	30 (86)	37.2 (99.0)	40.2 (104.4)	38.3 (100.9)	33.4 (92.1)	28.8 (83.8)	21.1 (70.0)	16.6 (61.9)	40.2 (104.4)
Mean daily maximum °C (°F)	7.4 (45.3)	8.7 (47.7)	11.8 (53.2)	15.2 (59.4)	18.4 (65.1)	22 (72)	24.4 (75.9)	24.1 (75.4)	20.8 (69.4)	16.2 (61.2)	11.1 (52.0)	8 (46)	15.7 (60.3)
Daily mean °C (°F)	4.6 (40.3)	5.2 (41.4)	7.3 (45.1)	9.7 (49.5)	13 (55)	16.2 (61.2)	18.3 (64.9)	18.2 (64.8)	15.2 (59.4)	12.1 (53.8)	7.9 (46.2)	5 (41)	11.1 (52.0)
Mean daily minimum °C (°F)	1.7 (35.1)	1.8 (35.2)	2.9 (37.2)	4.3 (39.7)	7.5 (45.5)	10.4 (50.7)	12.1 (53.8)	12.2 (54.0)	9.6 (49.3)	7.9 (46.2)	4.7 (40.5)	2.1 (35.8)	6.4 (43.5)
Record low °C (°F)	−14.7 (5.5)	−12.9 (8.8)	−9.2 (15.4)	−6.6 (20.1)	−2.8 (27.0)	0.1 (32.2)	2.7 (36.9)	2.2 (36.0)	0 (32)	−6.9 (19.6)	−7.7 (18.1)	−13 (9)	−14.7 (5.5)
Average precipitation mm (inches)	62.5 (2.46)	54.4 (2.14)	51.3 (2.02)	48.6 (1.91)	60.2 (2.37)	47.1 (1.85)	50.4 (1.98)	54.8 (2.16)	50.2 (1.98)	69.7 (2.74)	68.2 (2.69)	74.5 (2.93)	691.9 (27.24)
Average precipitation days (≥ 1.0 mm)	12.3	11.6	10.2	9.3	9.6	8.3	8.5	8.7	8	11.6	12.7	13.9	124.7
Average relative humidity (%)	87	83	79	74	74	72	71	72	76	82	87	87	79
Mean monthly sunshine hours	86.8	106.4	161.2	220.1	232.5	252	263.5	241.8	195	145.7	102	96.1	2,103.1
Source 1: Météo France
Source 2: Climate data (relative humidity & Average Sunshine hours)

== Population ==
Historical population

Year	Pop.	±% p.a.
1793	5,598	—
1800	5,618	+0.05%
1806	6,013	+1.14%
1821	5,457	−0.64%
1836	5,772	+0.37%
1841	5,611	−0.56%
1846	5,634	+0.08%
1851	5,673	+0.14%
1856	5,833	+0.56%
1861	5,638	−0.68%
1866	5,401	−0.86%
1872	5,725	+0.98%
1876	5,788	+0.27%
1881	6,300	+1.71%
1886	6,285	−0.05%
1891	6,247	−0.12%
1896	6,309	+0.20%
1901	6,291	−0.06%

Year	Pop.	±% p.a.
1906	6,387	+0.30%
1911	6,870	+1.47%
1921	6,753	−0.17%
1926	7,129	+1.09%
1931	7,038	−0.26%
1936	7,204	+0.47%
1946	6,711	−0.71%
1954	8,339	+2.75%
1962	12,757	+5.46%
1968	14,558	+2.23%
1975	16,774	+2.04%
1982	17,327	+0.46%
1990	16,413	−0.68%
1999	16,596	+0.12%
2007	14,642	−1.55%
2012	14,219	−0.58%
2017	13,823	−0.56%
2023	13,527	−0.36%

Source: EHESS and INSEE (1968–2023)

== Main sights and notable buildings ==
=== Museums ===
- Maison Des Dentelles Museum dedicated to Argentan lace
- Museum of Fernand Léger – André Mare Museum dedicated to Fernand Léger and André Mare, two major 20th-century artists from Argentan

=== National heritage sites ===
The commune has a total of 18 buildings and areas listed as a Monument historique:

- Donjon of Argentan – Ramparts of Argentan built in the Middle Ages by Henri I. It was classed as a Monument historique in 1945.
- Tour Marguerite – a 12th-century medieval tower built by Henri I. It was classed as a Monument Historique in 1965.
- Castle of the Dukes – a 14th-century castle built by Pierre II of Alençon, it is now a court house. it was classed as a monument historique in 1889. The grounds of the castle houses the 14th-century St. Nicholas Chapel, which is also classed as a monument historique.
- Saint Martin church – built in the 16th century, it was listed as monument historique in 1862.
- Saint Germain church – 15th-century church listed as monument historique in 1889.
- Hotel du Moulin de Fontenelle – 18th-century L-shaped hotel, added as a monument in 2004.
- Former Hotel Servain – 17th-century hotel, whose door was added as a monument in 1948.
- Henri IV House – Built in 1623, it served as the town hall from 1722 to 1809; it was classified in 1946.
- Hôtel Ango-de-la-Motte – Former seventeenth-century hotel, it was classified in 1948.
- Three Crosses Column – erected in 1771, the three crosses are believed to be either to mark the meeting place of three 12th-century kings, commemorate the expulsion of the English in 1450, or to redeem the vandalism of Theodore Beza in 1563.
- Statue of the Virgin – erected in 1648, it was registered in 1934
- Former residence of the Abbess of the Benedictines – erected in 1623, it was built to receive novices from Almenêches Abbey to replace former nuns who died and those who had opposed the establishment of the new customs of the Reformation. It was registered in 1932.
- Count of Lonlay – former 17th-century hotel, which was registered in 1948
- Norman house – 14th-century house, which was registered in 1948
- Lemonnier house – 14th-century house, which was registered in 1948
- Aumont-de-la-Vente Hotel – former 17th-century hotel, where James II of England stayed in 1692, during his period of exile. Classed as a Monument historique in 1948.
- Former church of Notre-Dame-de-la-Place – former 12th-century church for medieval pilgrims, that was sold in 1820 and became a dwelling house. It became a monument historique in 1986.

=== Architecture contemporaine remarquable ===
The commune has two buildings listed as being Architecture contemporaine remarquable.

- Hôtel de ville – The city hall was built in 1957 and designed by architect Roland Geffroy, in 2007 it was awarded the Architecture contemporaine remarquable label.
- Église Saint-Michel – Designed by architect Meurice in 1968, in 2004 it was awarded the Architecture contemporaine remarquable label.

=== Other points of interest ===
- Les Pâtures d’Argentan is a 13 Hectare Natura 2000 site, part of the Haute vallée de l'Orne et affluents area, in the middle of the town. The site has a lake, La Noé, and features three protected species that are present on the site all year round' the Eurasian otter, the Southwestern water vole and the common bloodroot.
- Carrière de Belle-Eau is an old quarry for the extraction of sand, that was closed shortly after World War two, which was bought by the commune in 1989. In 1995 the area was turned into an 18 960 m2 nature reserve. The site today hosts nearly 200 different species of flora and fauna, including thyme broomrape, Common parsley frog, Smooth newt and leopard marsh orchid.

=== Gallery ===
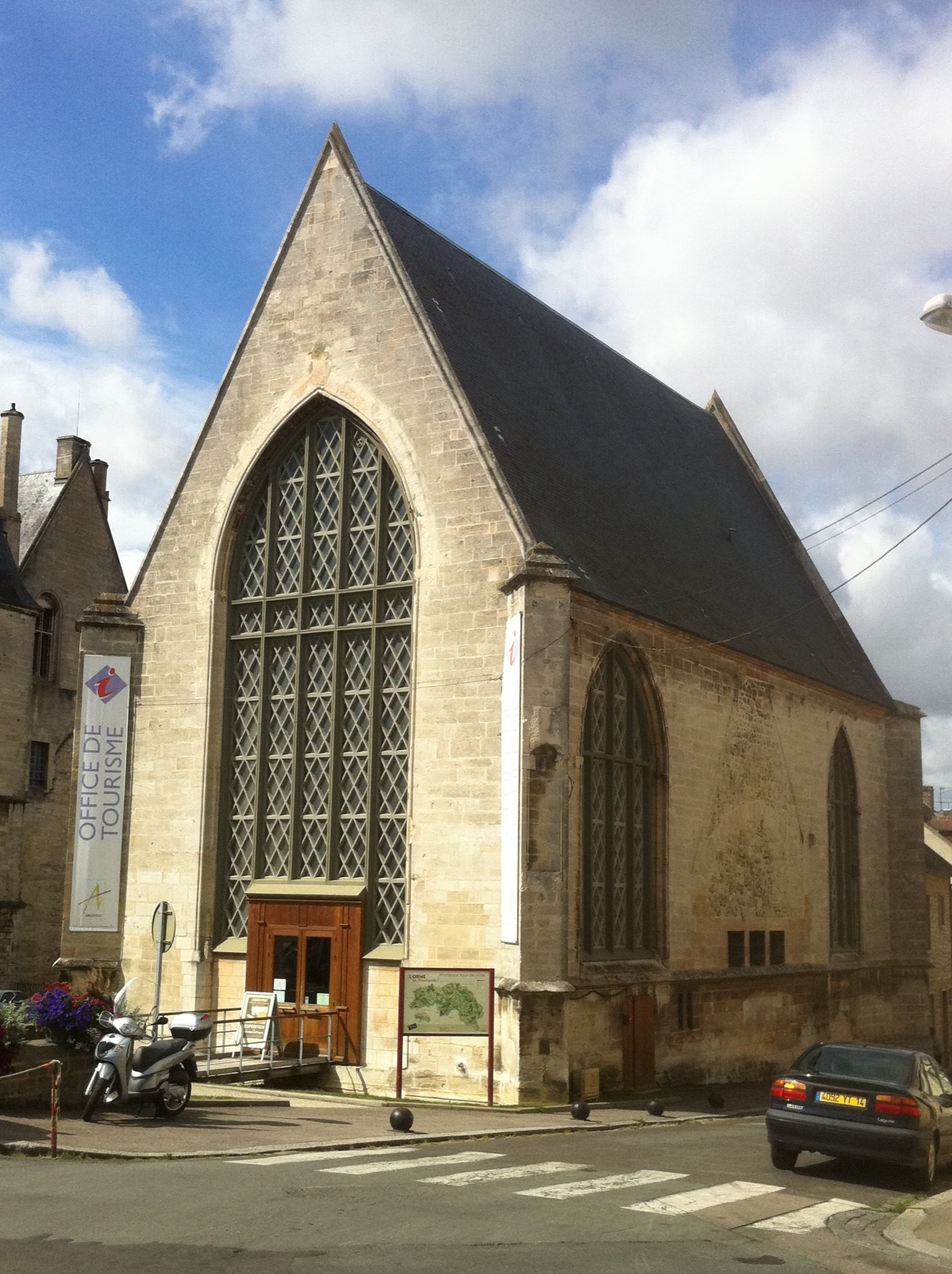
Chapel Saint Nicholas – built at the end of the 11th century

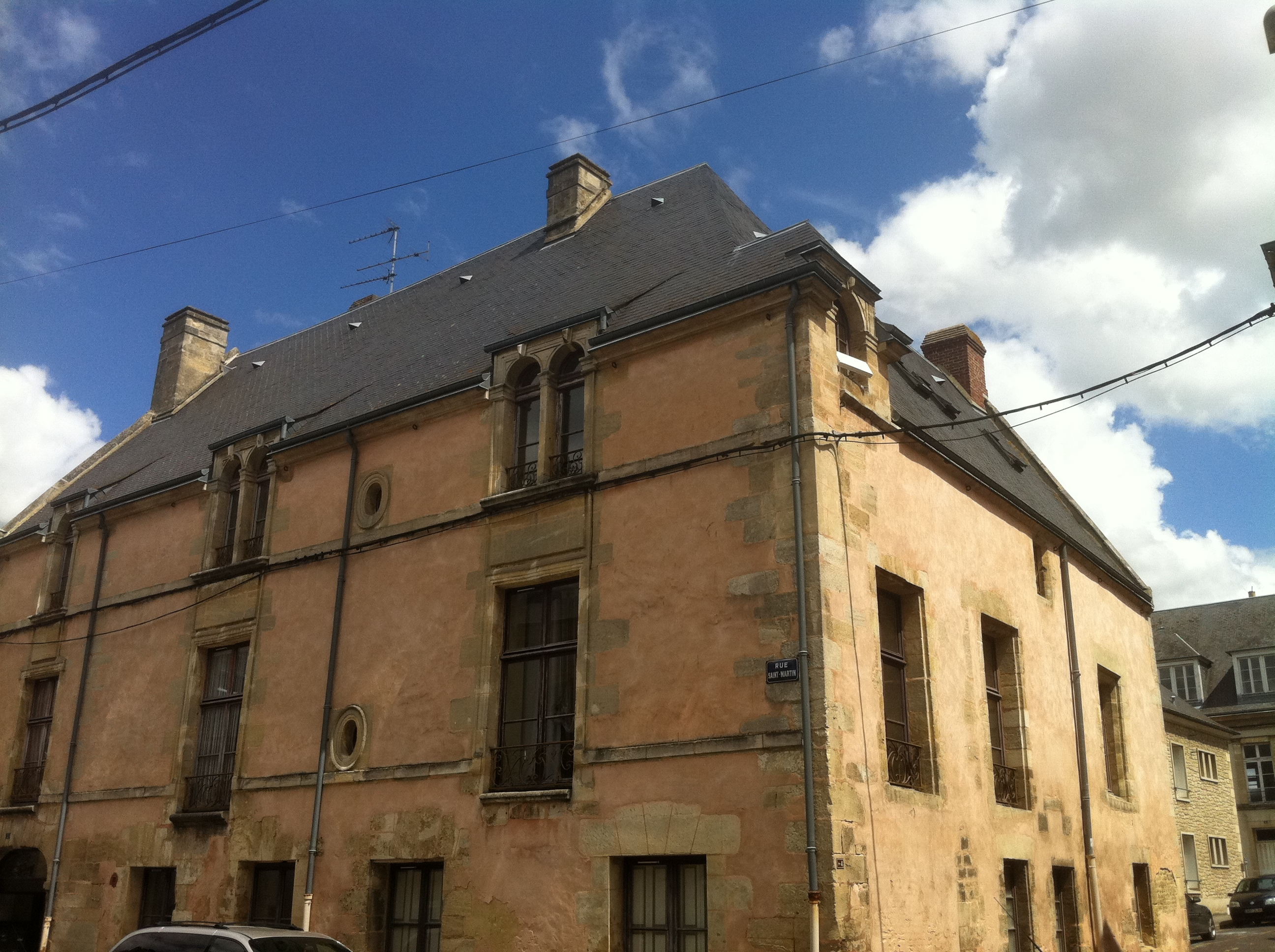
Hôtel du Moulin de Tercey, 2 rue Saint-Martin

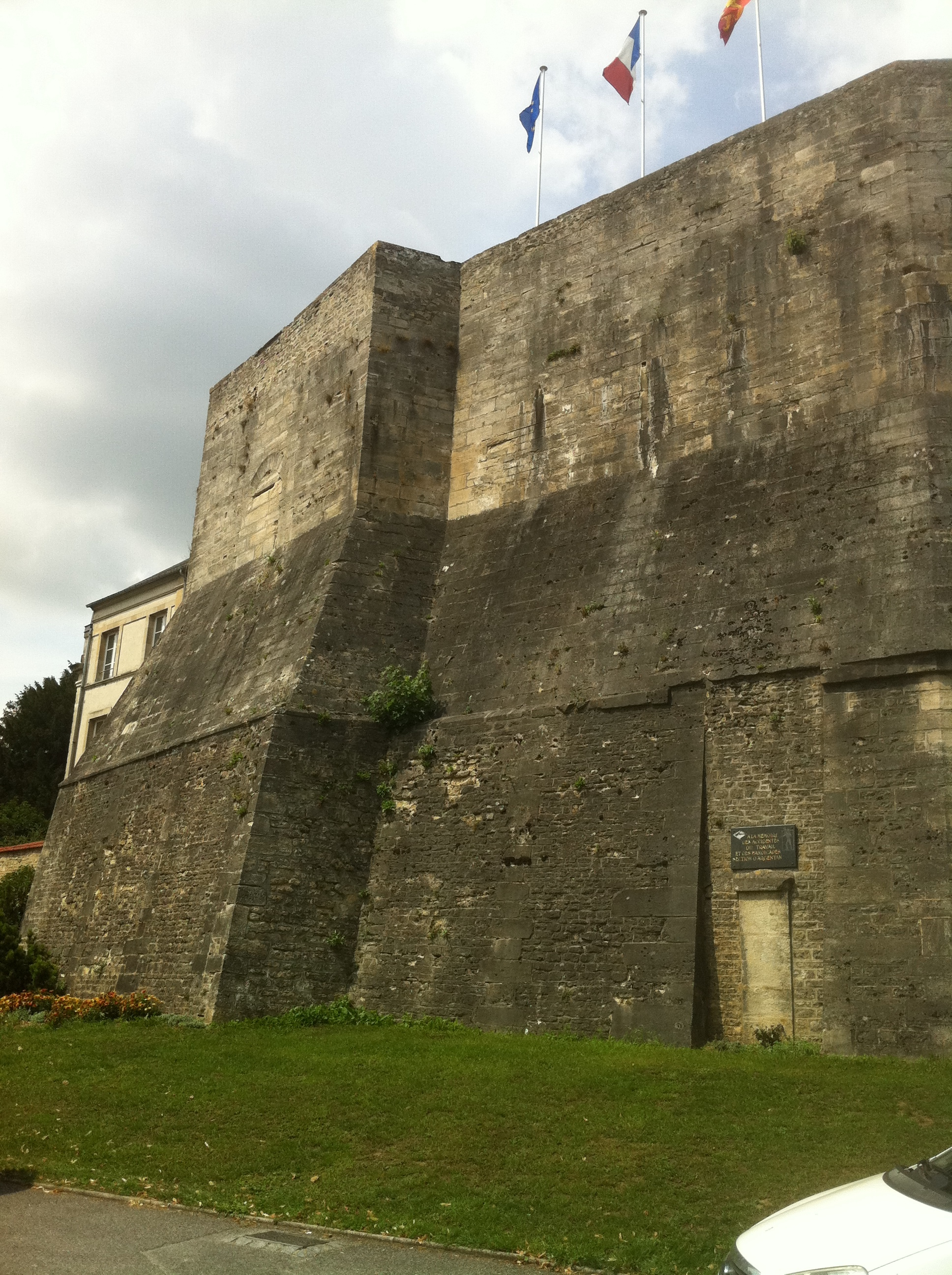
Donjon of Argentan, built by Henry II of England

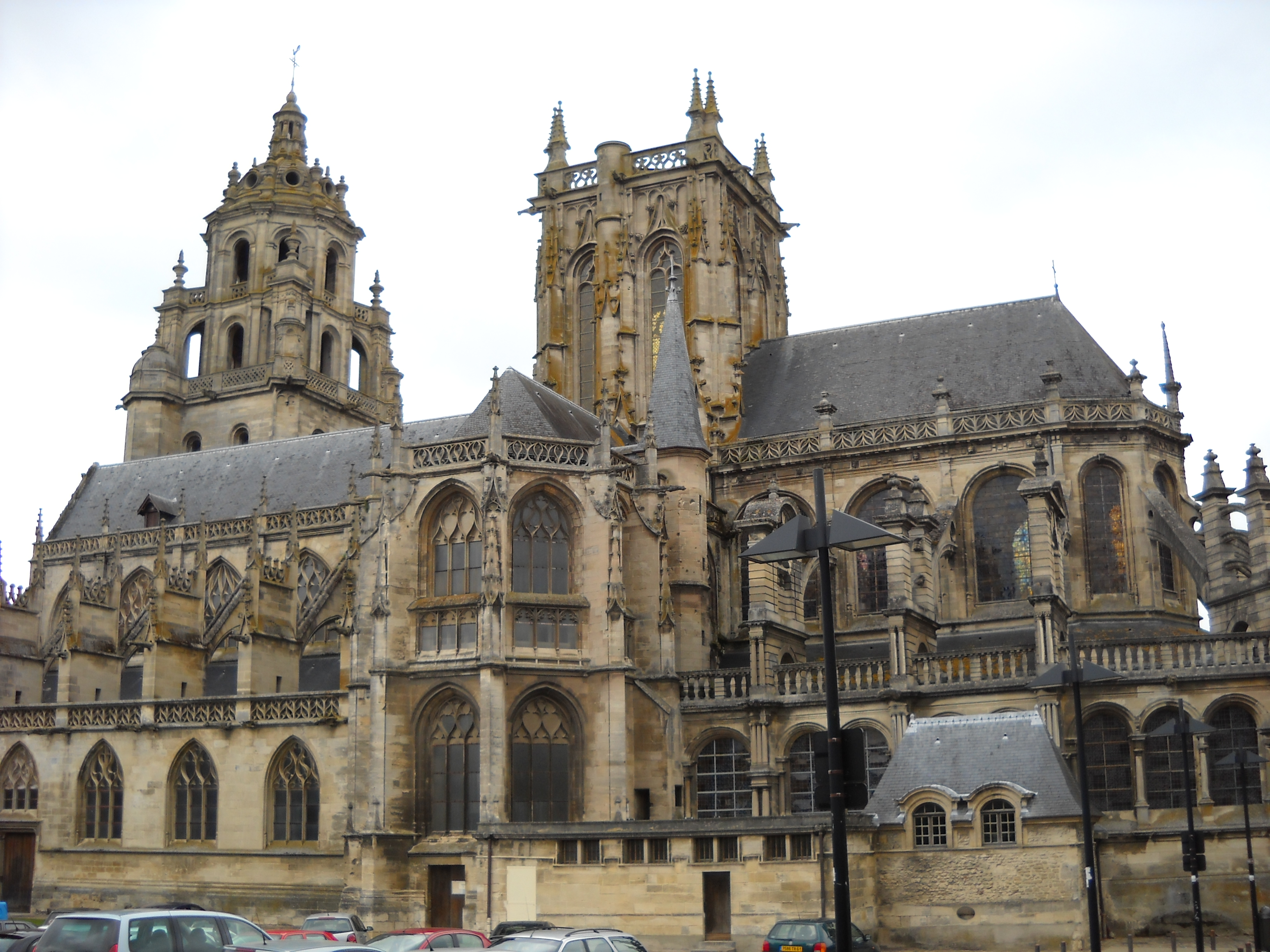
Saint Germain church (built 16th–18th centuries)

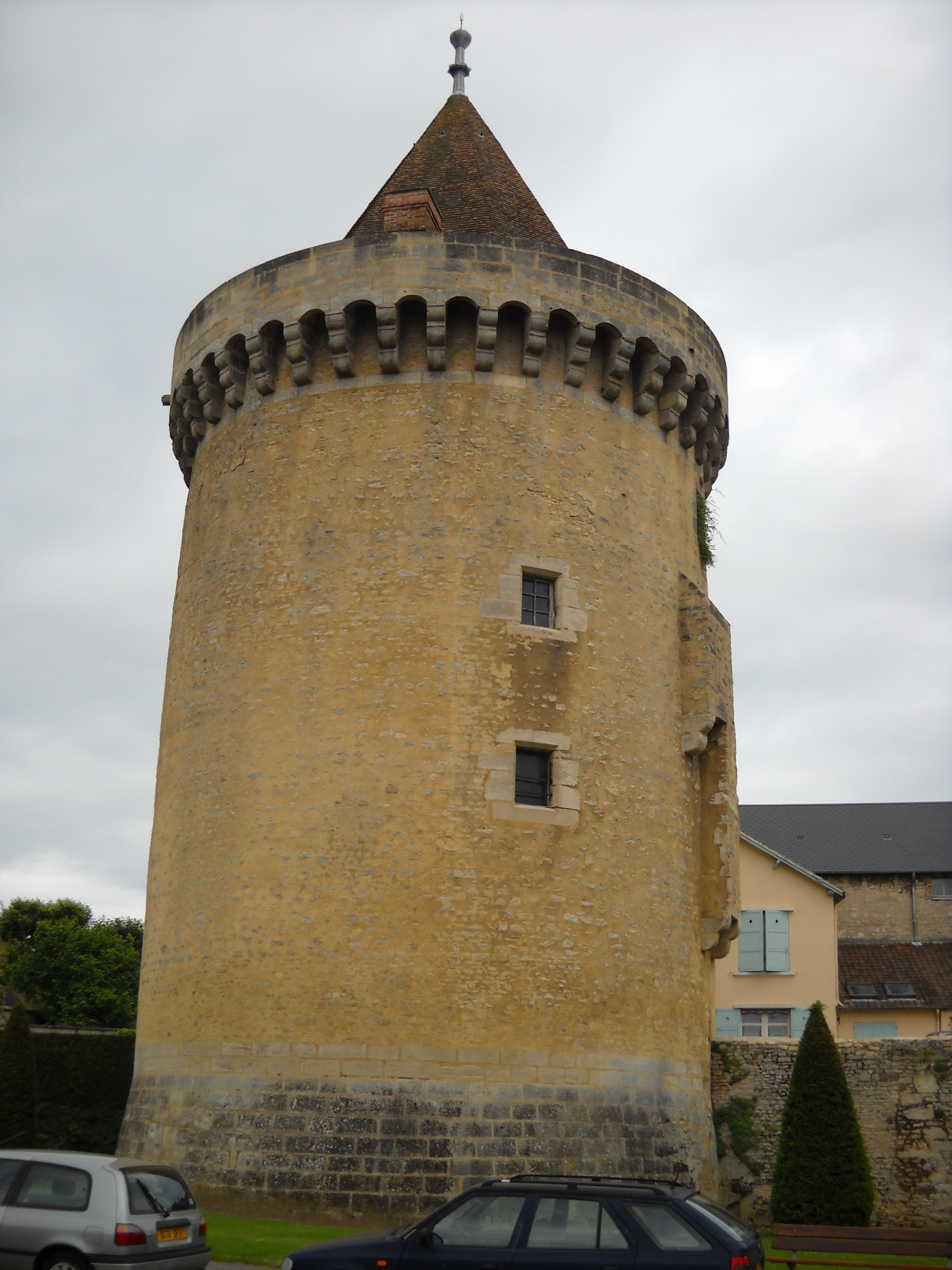
Tour Marguerite is the only surviving medieval tower

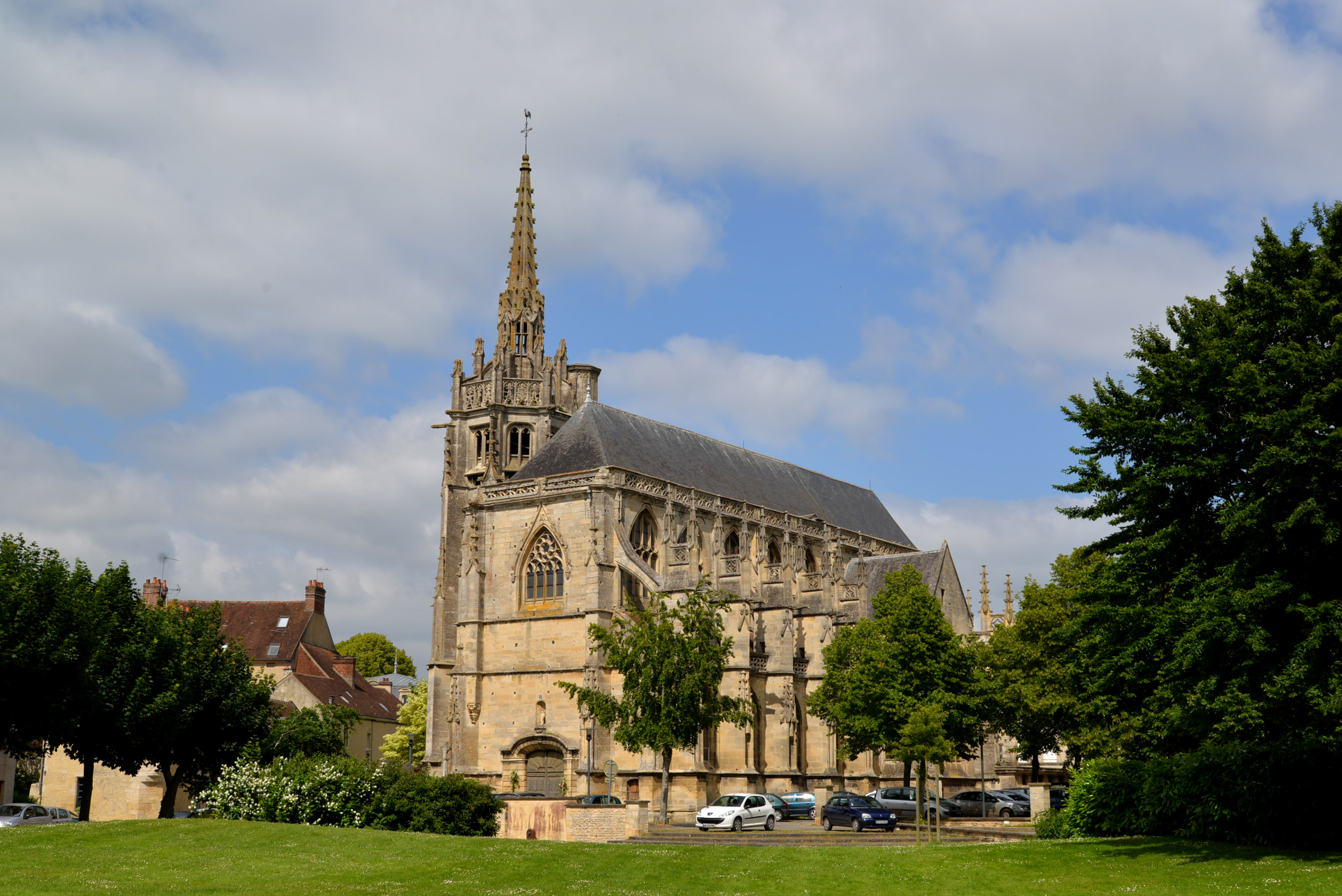
Saint Martin church, built in the 15th and 16th centuries

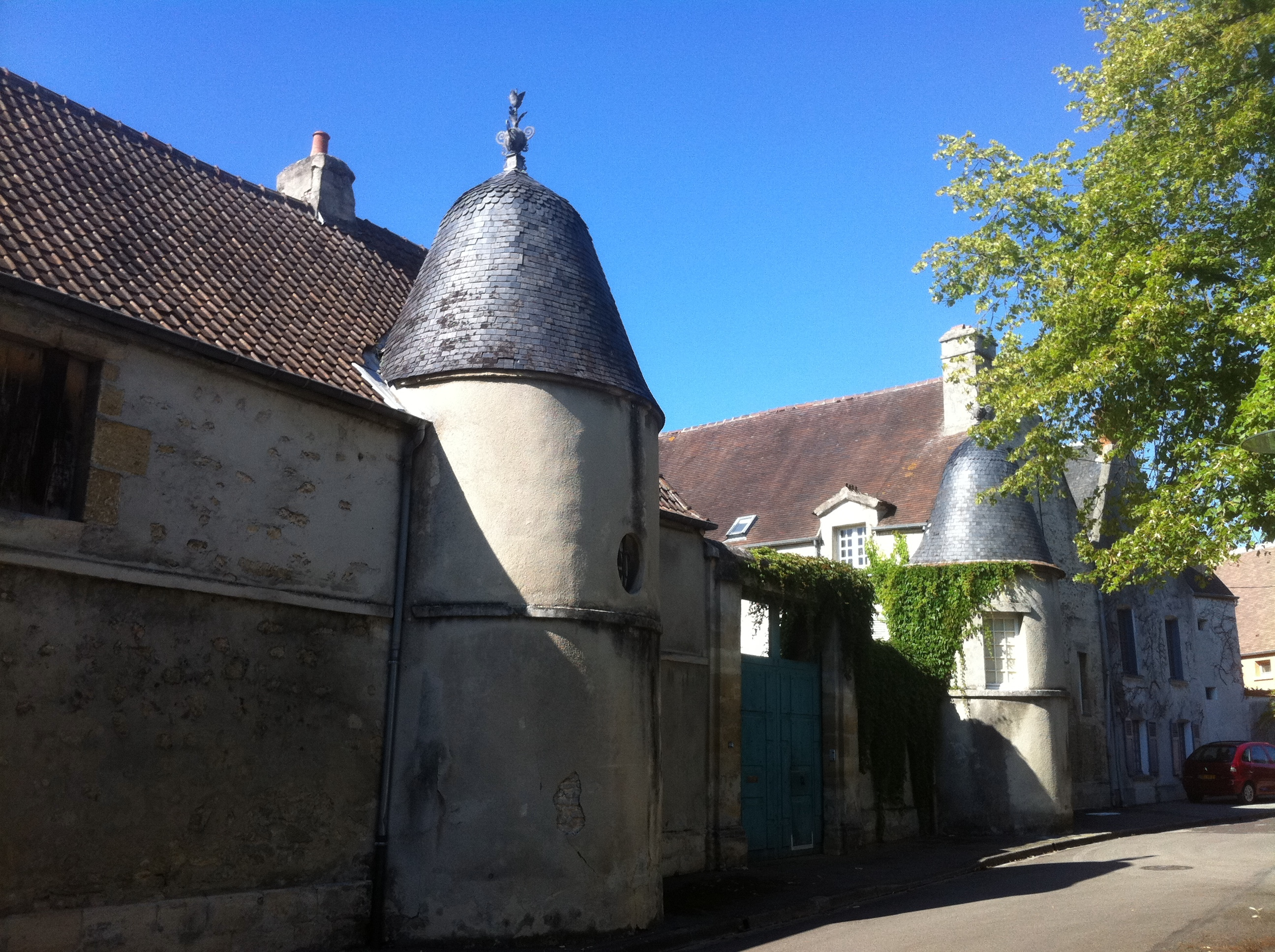
Hotel Joseph de Laleu 56 rue Saint Martin built in 1651

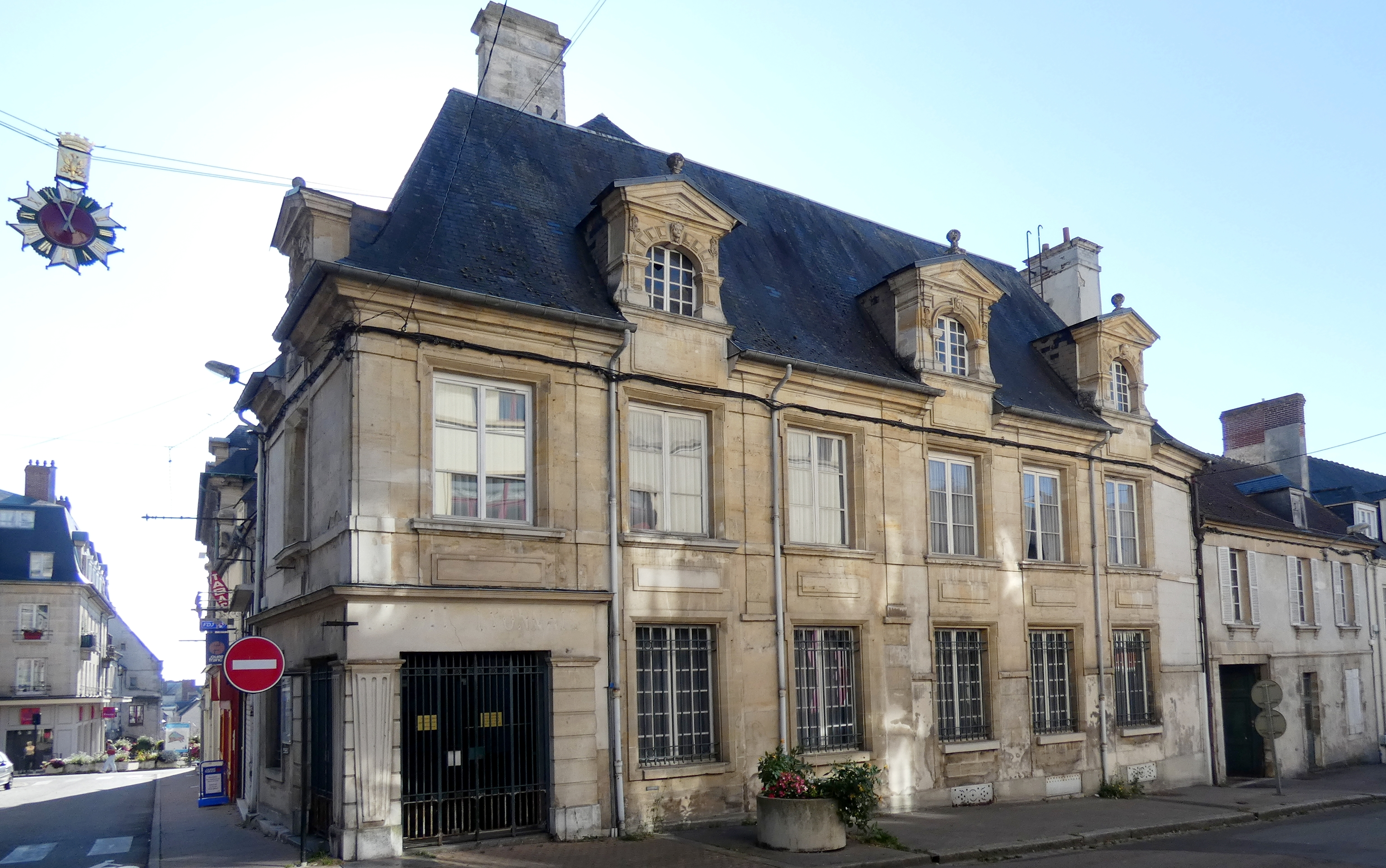
This hotel particulier was the Nicolas Ango house

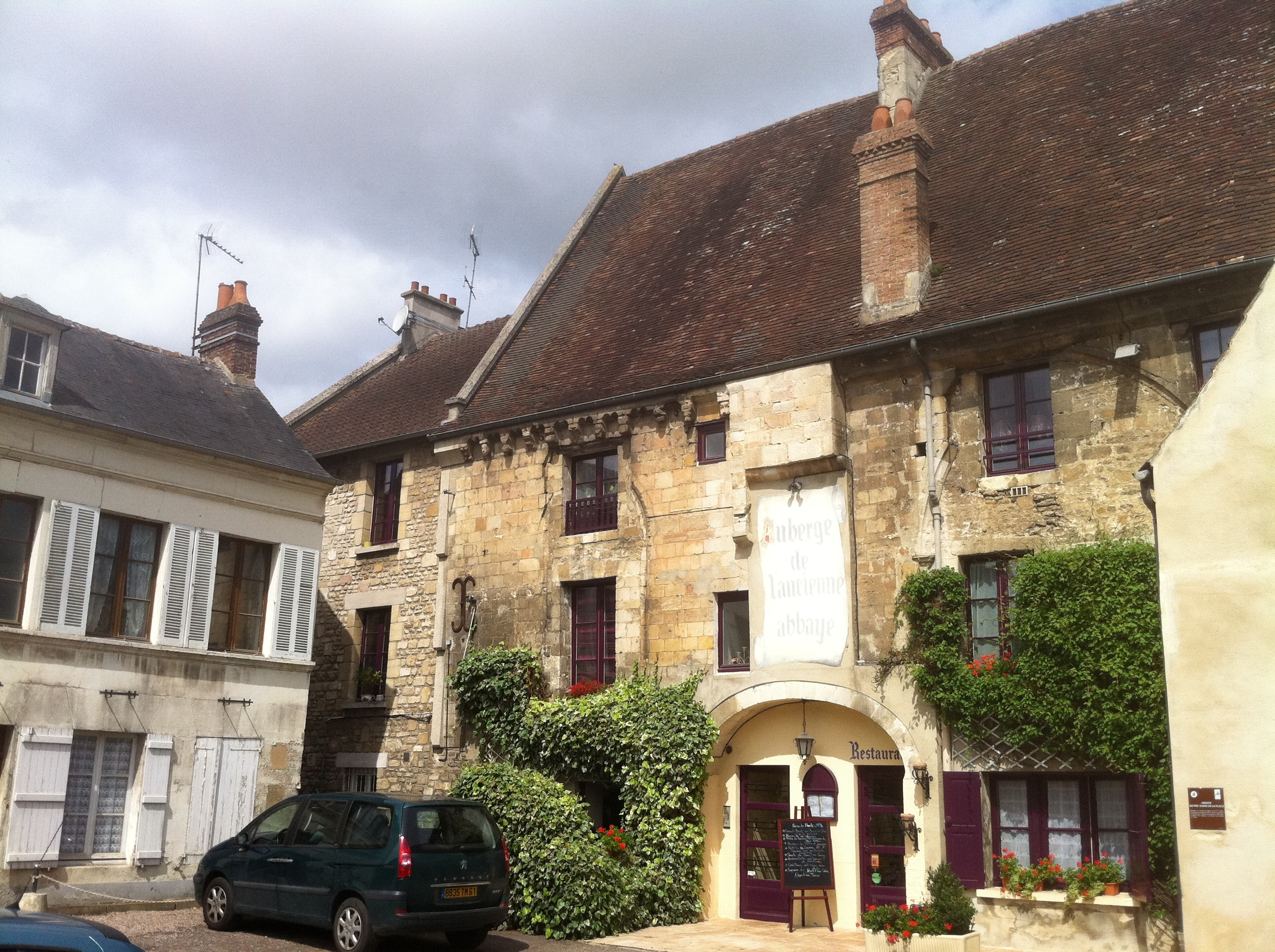
The former abbey, now a restaurant

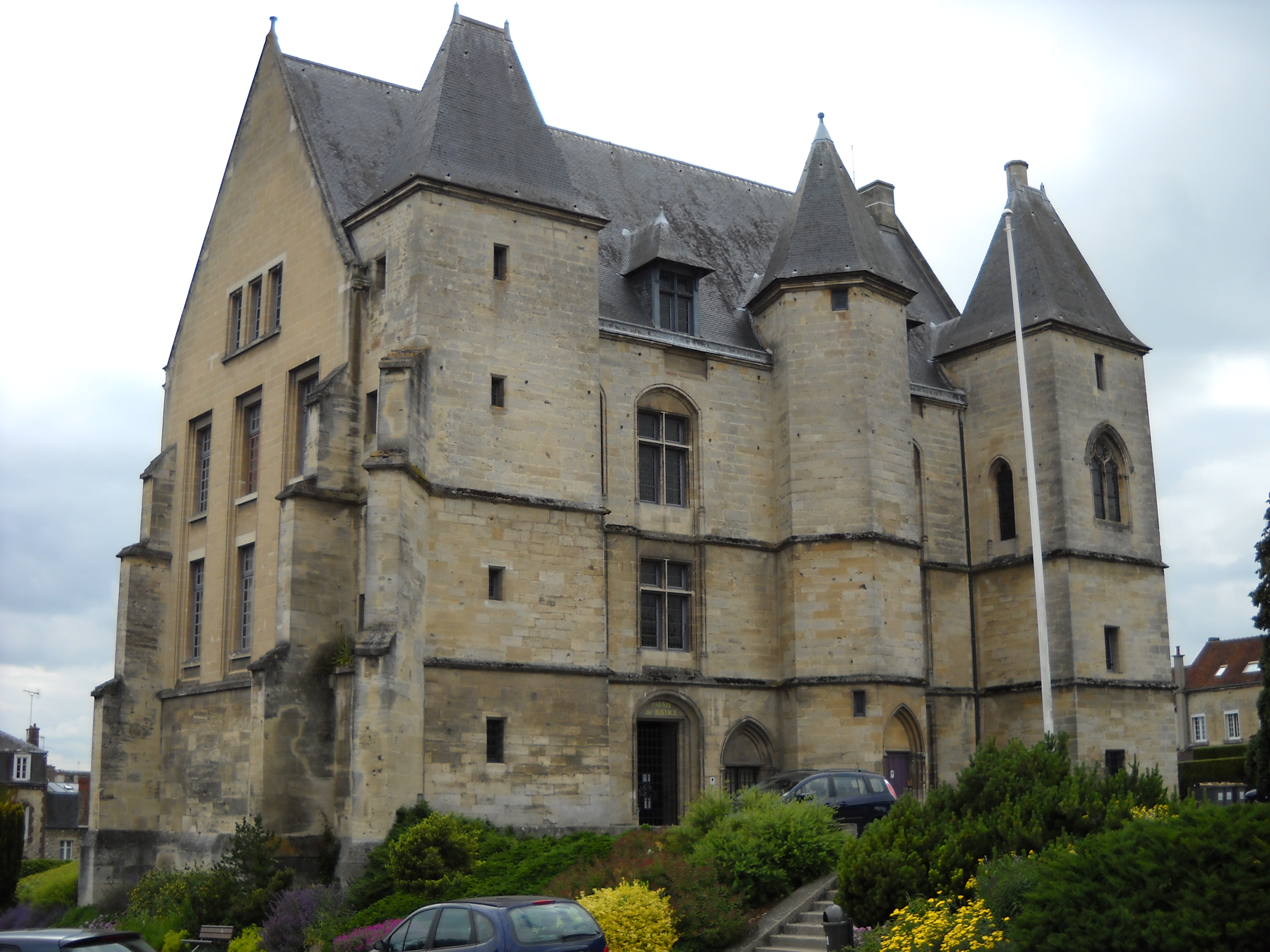
Château of the Dukes of Alençon (15th century), now the Court House

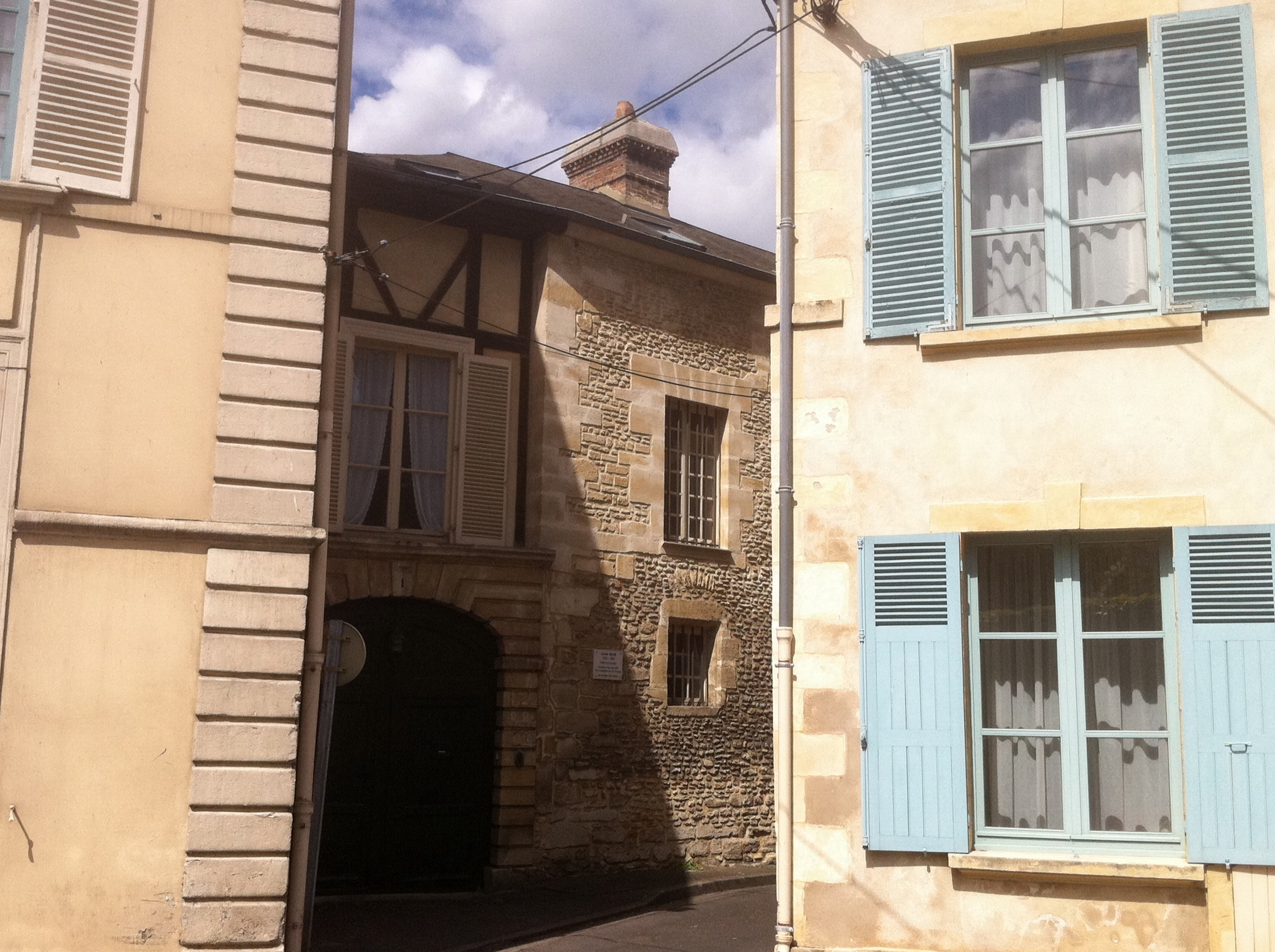
Birthplace of painter André Mare

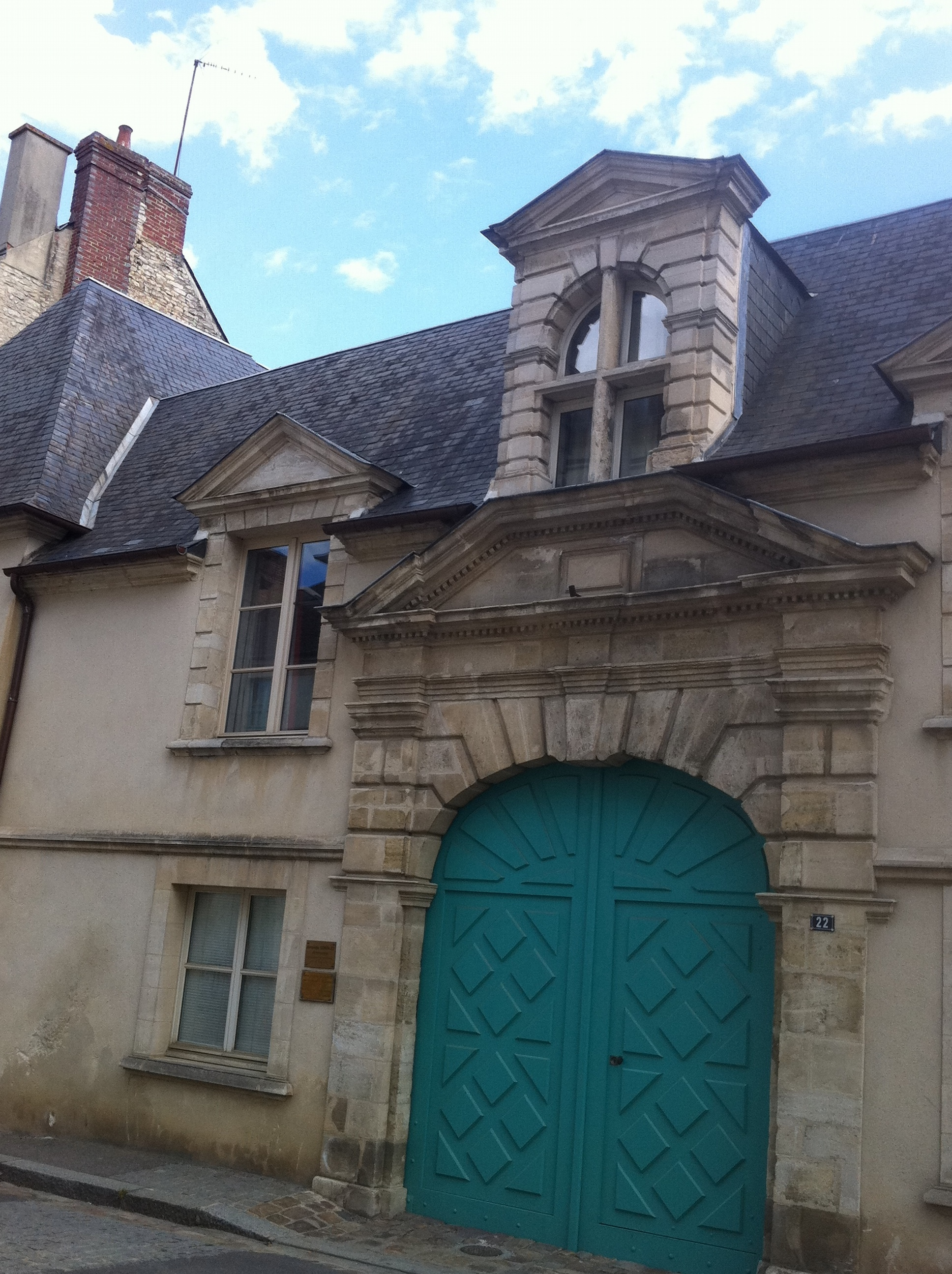
Hôtel du comte de Lonlay

== Culture ==
For two weeks every January, La foire Saint-Vincent, is held in the commune. The fair sees the arrival of lots of amusement rides, and has been going since the beginning of the 19th century. It attracts approximately 15,000 visitors per year.

== Sport ==
The commune has a football club, Football Club Argentan who play at Stade Gérard Saint.

The Hippodrome d'Argentan is the local racecourse that is located a few metres from the boundary edge of Argentan in the commune of Gouffern en Auge.

Argentan has a swimming pool, Le centre aquatique du Pays d'Argentan, that features a sports pool, children's pool, wading pool, an aquatic slide and two jacuzzis.

== Notable people ==
- William FitzEmpress (1136 –1164) – the youngest of the three sons of Empress Matilda and Geoffrey Plantagenet, Count of Anjou was born here.
- Giles d'Argentan (c. 1280 – 24 June 1314), Norman knight who was killed at the Battle of Bannockburn
- Peter II, Count of Alençon (1340–1404), the count of Alençon and count of Perche died here.
- John II, Duke of Alençon (1409–1476), was a French nobleman born here, and best known as a general in the Last Phase of the Hundred Years' War and for his role as a comrade-in-arms of Joan of Arc.
- Margaret of Lorraine (1463–1521) – A French noblewoman and a nun of the order of Poor Clares who was beatified in 1921, died here.
- Guillaume Mahot (1630–1684) – served as the Apostolic Vicar of Cochin, was born here.
- Marguerite de Lubert (1702–1785) a French woman of letters died here.
- Charles-Alexis Chauvet (1837–1871) a French organist and composer died here.
- Vincent Muselli (1879–1956) a French writer and poet was born here.
- Fernand Léger (1881–1955), painter was born in Argentan
- André Mare (1885–1935), painter was born in Argentan
- André Rouyer (1929–1994) a French actor was born here.
- François Doubin – (1933–2019) a French politician and cabinet minister who lived and died here.
- Gérard Saint (1935–1960) a bike racer who won the Combativity award in 1959 Tour de France was born here.
- Richard Peduzzi (born 1945) a French scenographer was born here.
- Michel Onfray (born 1959), writer and philosopher born here.
- Claude Carlin (born 1961) a former cyclist was born here.
- Franck Berrier (1984–2021), a former professional footballer was born here.
- Florent Geroux (born 1986) is a jockey who was born here.
- Jérémy Leveau (born 1992) a professional cyclist was born here
- Léo Brière (born 1994) – a mentalist and illusionist who was born here.
- Gaëtan Laura (born 1995) – Professional footballer was born here.
- Logan Fontaine (born 1999) - Logan Fontaine an open water swimmer was born here.

== Transport ==
- Argentan station has rail connections to Caen, Le Mans, Paris and Granville.
- Aérodrome d'Argentan is an Aerodrome that was opened in 1946. Its ICAO airport code is LFAJ.
- Route nationale 26 is a highway Argentan with connecting Verneuil-sur-Avre.

== Twin towns – sister cities ==
Argentan is twinned with:

- Abingdon-on-Thames, England, United Kingdom
- Baja, Hungary
- Rotenburg an der Fulda, Germany

== See also ==
- Communes of the Orne department
- Château de la Motte, Joué du Plain
