= Henri Maréchal =

French composer

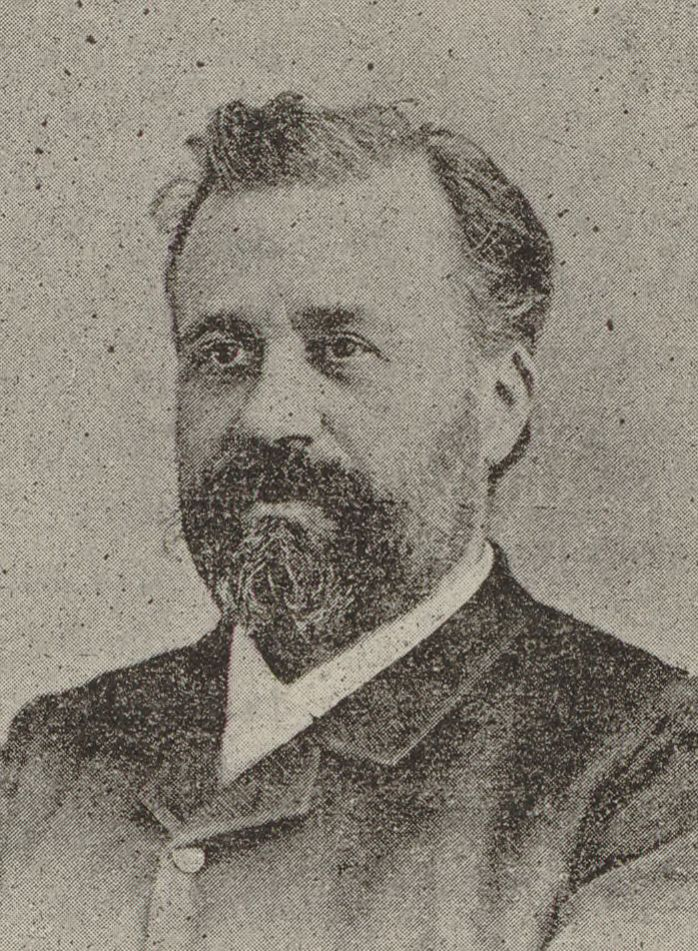
Henri Maréchal

Henri Maréchal (22 January 1842 – 12 May 1924) was a French composer.

== Life ==
Born in Paris, Maréchal studied music theory with Émile Chevé and Édouard Batiste and piano with Louis Chollet. On the advice of Alexis de Castillon, he entered the composition class of Victor Massé at the Conservatoire de Paris, where he also studied organ with François Benoist and counterpoint with Charles-Alexis Chauvet. In 1870 he won the Premier Grand Prix de Rome with the cantata Le Jugement de Dieu .

After the stay in the villa Medici in Rome associated with the prize, he made his debut as a composer in Paris with the "poème sacré" La Nativité (1875). He then composed several operas, ballets and dramatic music, another "drame sacré", choral and orchestral works, songs, chamber music pieces and motets. His first opera Les Amoureux de Catherine was performed for the hundredth time in 1889 and was given until 1920. Maréchal's compositional style is often characterized by chromaticism, his musical expression simple, but dramatic and effective.

He also wrote music-critical articles for Le Figaro and published several volumes of Memories and in 1910 the Monographie universelle de l'Orphéon. He corresponded with the composer Marguerite Olagnier.

Maréchal died in Paris.

== Selected works ==
- La Nativité, poème sacré, 1875
- Les Amoureux de Catherine, Opera, 1876
- La Taverne des Trabans, Opera, 1876
- L'Ami Fritz, theatrical music, 1876
- L'Etoile, Opera, 1881
- Les Rantzau, theatrical music, 1882
- Les vivants et les mortes for four voices and orchestra, 1886
- Le Miracle de Naïm, drame sacré, 1887
- Déidamie, Opera, 1893
- Calendal, Opera, 1894
- Esquisses vénitiennes, "Suite symphonique" for Orchestra, 1894
- Pin-Sin, Opera, 1895
- Daphnis et Chloé, Opera, 1899
- Le Lac des Aulnes, Opera, 1907
- Crime et châtiment, theatrical music
- Rapsodie for violin and piano
- Elégie for viola and piano,
- Chansons du Midi for Choir
- Provence for Choir
- Le Voyage for Choir
- Agnus Dei three-part motet
- Kyrie, three-part motet
- Ave verum, motet for solo baritone
- O Salutaris, motet

== Writings ==
- Rome: Souvenirs d'un musicien (1904)
- Paris: Souvenirs d'un musicien (1907)
- Monographie universelle de l'Orphéon (1910)
- Lettres et Souvenirs, 1871–1874 (1920)
