= St Nicholas Church, Poling =

Coordinates: 50.8315°N 0.5146°W

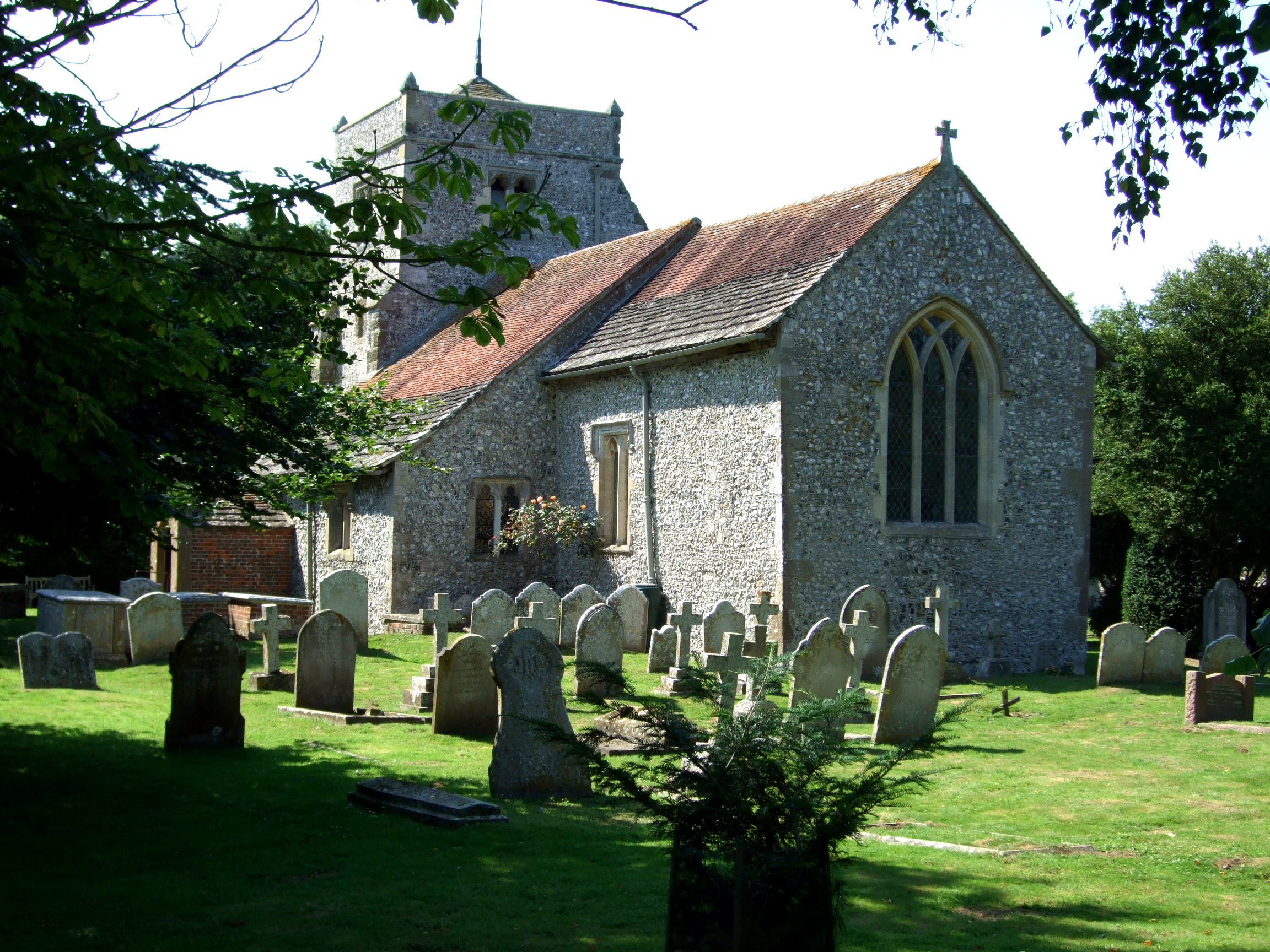
- St Nicholas Church, Poling
- St Nicholas Church, Poling
- OS grid reference: TQ 04702 04602
- Location: Poling, West Sussex
- Country: England
- Denomination: Church of England

History
- Status: Parish church
- Founded: Saxon era
- Dedication: St Nicholas

Architecture
- Functional status: Active
- Heritage designation: Grade I
- Designated: 12 October 1954
- Architectural type: Church
- Style: Saxon, Norman, Gothic
- Completed: 15th century

Administration
- Province: Canterbury
- Diocese: Chichester
- Archdeaconry: Chichester
- Deanery: Arundel and Bognor
- Parish: Poling

St Nicholas Church is a Grade I listed parish church located in the village of Poling, West Sussex, England. The church architecture dates from the Saxon period through to the 15th century. Constructed primarily of flint, the church features a nave with a south aisle, chancel, south porch, and a west tower. The interior is characterised by whitewashed walls and plain glass windows, with some fragments of medieval glass. The roof is of braced collar construction, supported by five tie beams adorned with carved wooden bosses, some of which were sourced from the Fitzalan Chapel in Arundel.

== History ==
=== Saxon Origins ===
The origins of St Nicholas Church trace back to the Saxon era, with the nave identified as Saxon in construction. A notable feature from this period is an original Saxon window on the north wall of the nave, discovered in 1917, which includes part of the original wooden shutter.

=== Norman & Medieval period ===
In the 12th century, the church came under the ownership of the Norman abbey of Almenêches and later passed to its daughter house at Lyminster in the 13th century. The south aisle was constructed circa 1190–1220, the chancel around 1380, and the west tower approximately in 1420.

=== Modern era ===
The south porch was added in the 19th century, around 1830. The church underwent restoration by G M Hills in 1875, at a cost of £611, enough to pay to remove the gallery and repair the fabric of the church. Further repairs by J L Denman and son in 1968 left the church largely unchanged.

St Nicholas was listed Grade I on 12 October 1954. The church retains a number of historic features including an 18th-century poor box and some fragments of medieval glass. The font is of great antiquity, likely 11th century and possibly pre-Conquest.

== Memorials and Burials ==
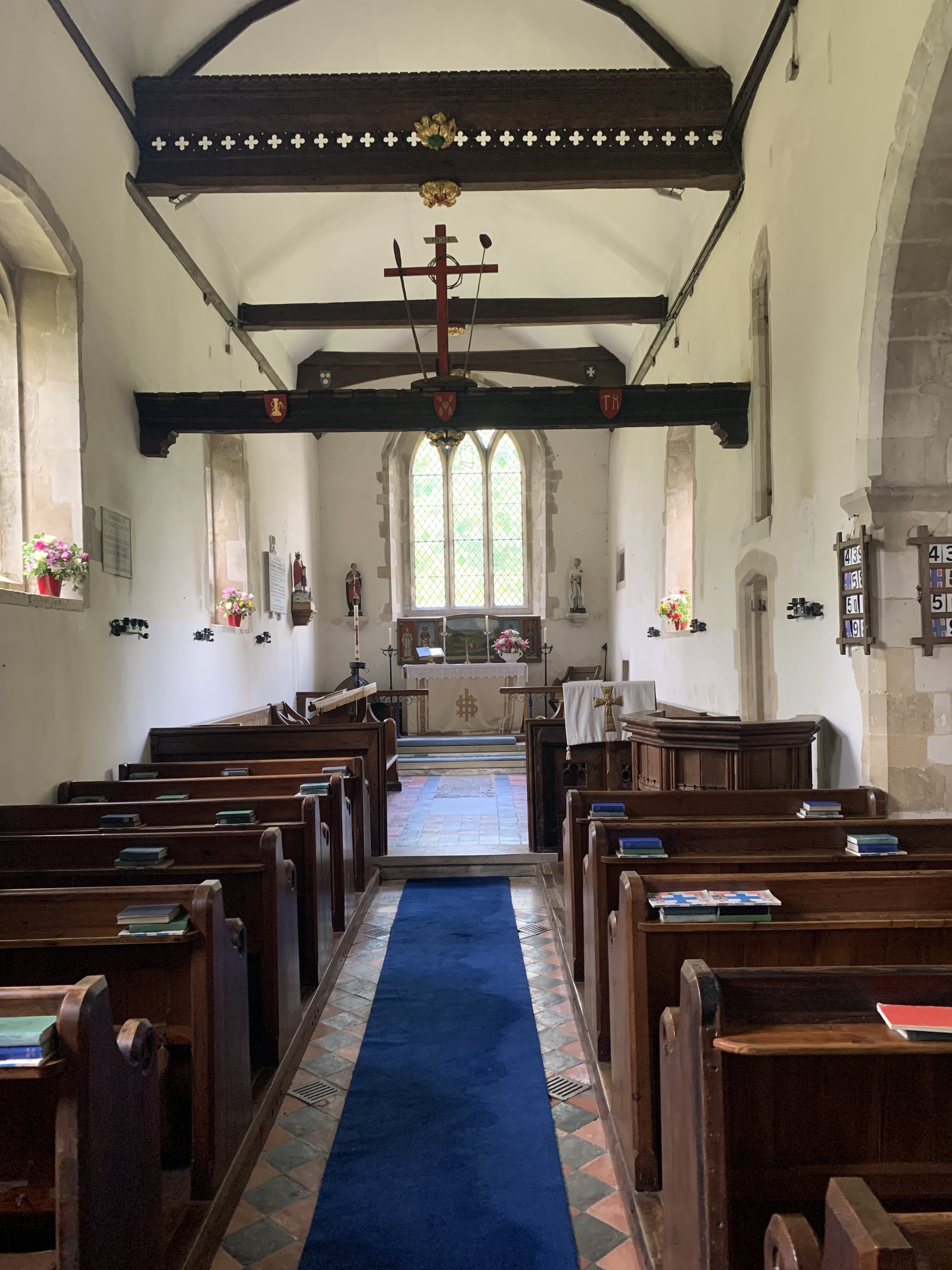
Interior of St Nicholas Church, Poling, West Sussex

The churchyard of St Nicholas Church is the final resting place of several notable individuals:

- Colin Cowdrey (1932–2000), an English cricketer who played for Kent and the England national team.
- Sir Harry Johnston (1858–1927), a British explorer, botanist, artist, and colonial administrator. He is commemorated inside the church by a wall plaque in the nave, carved by the Arts and Crafts sculptor and typeface designer Eric Gill.

== Access ==
St Nicholas Church is situated on the southeast edge of Poling village, adjacent to Manor Farm. Access to the church is via a footpath from Poling Street, next to the Old Vicarage.

== Gallery ==
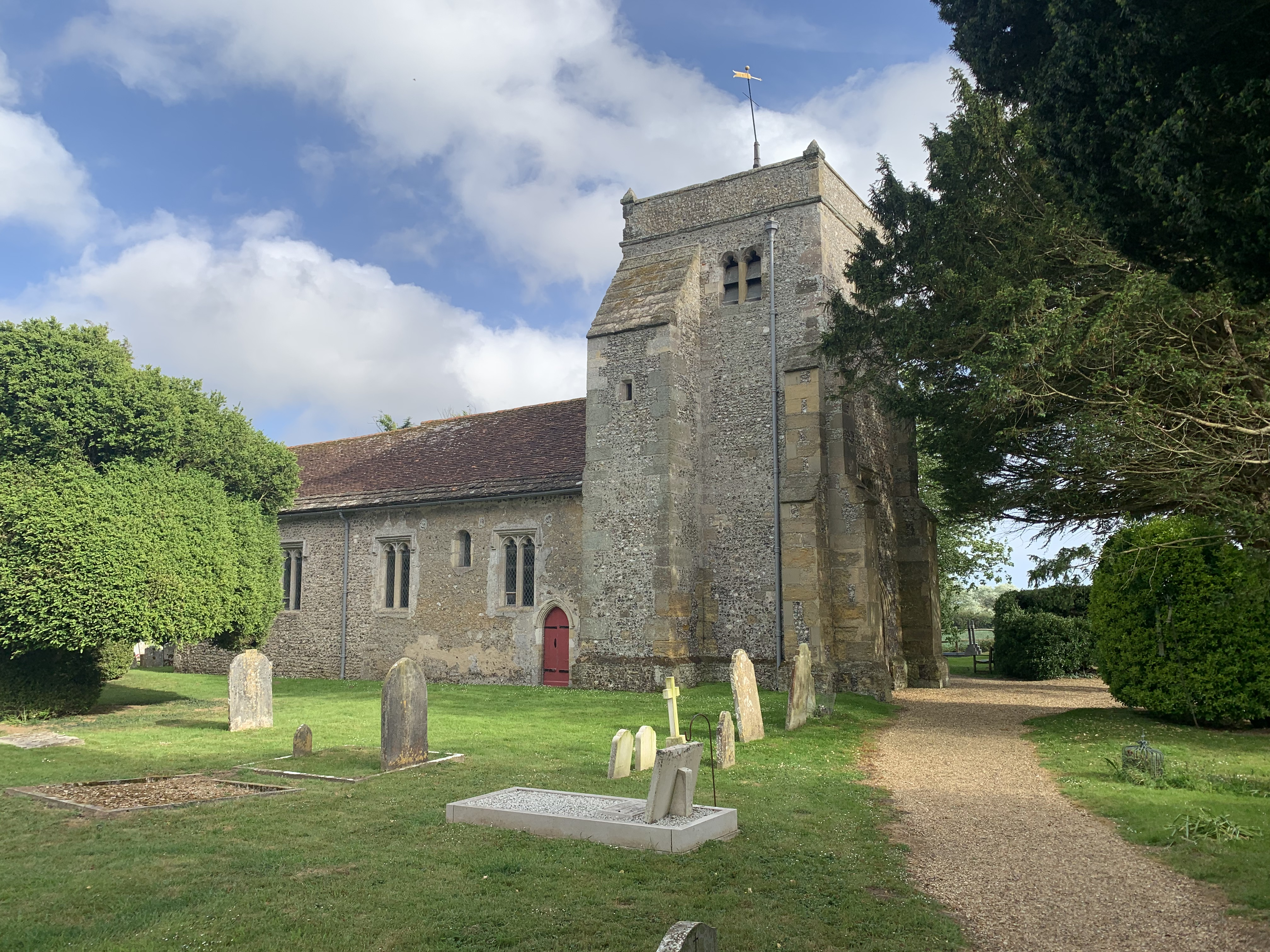
Exterior view

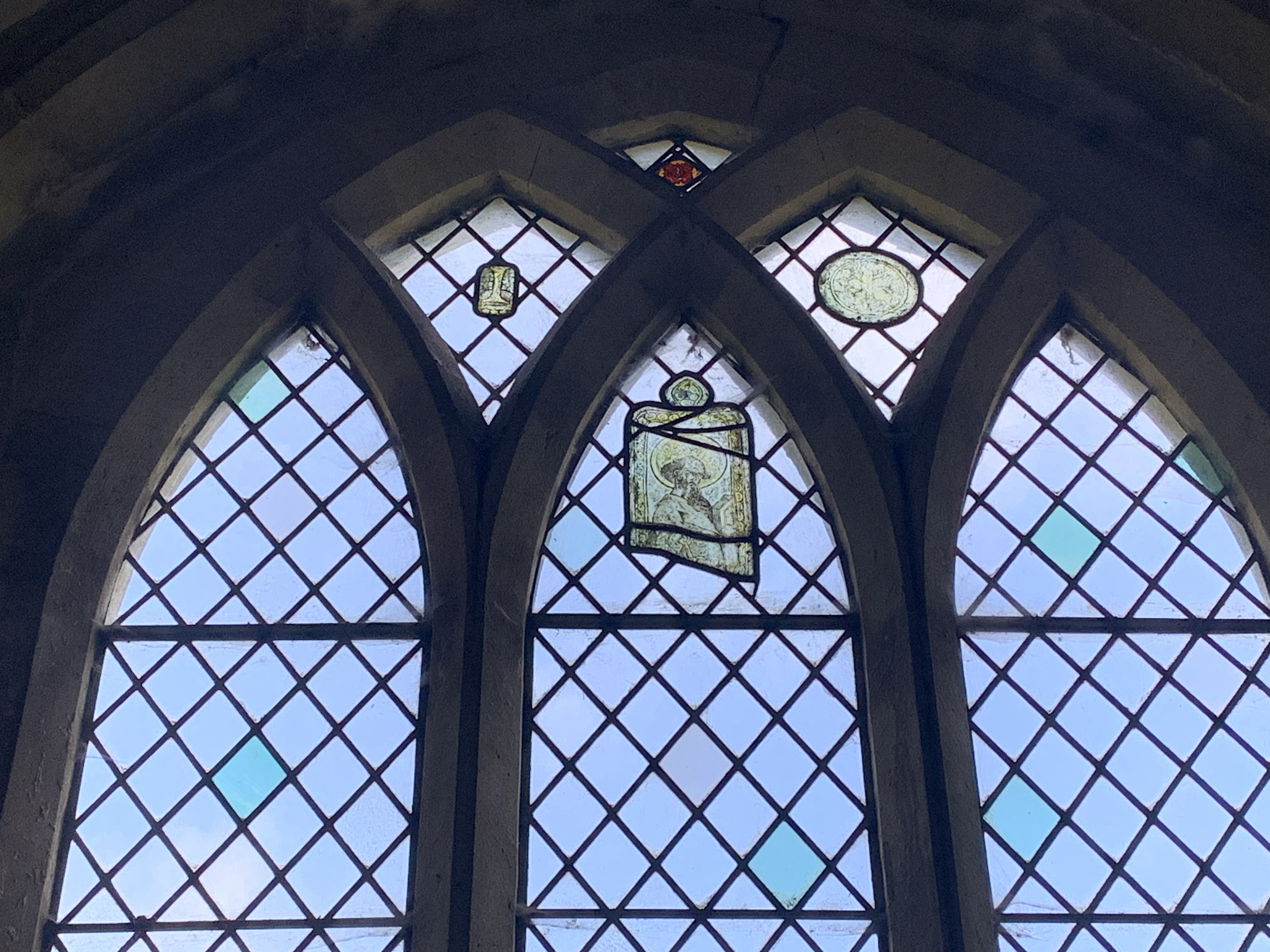
Stained Glass Window with fragments of medieval glass

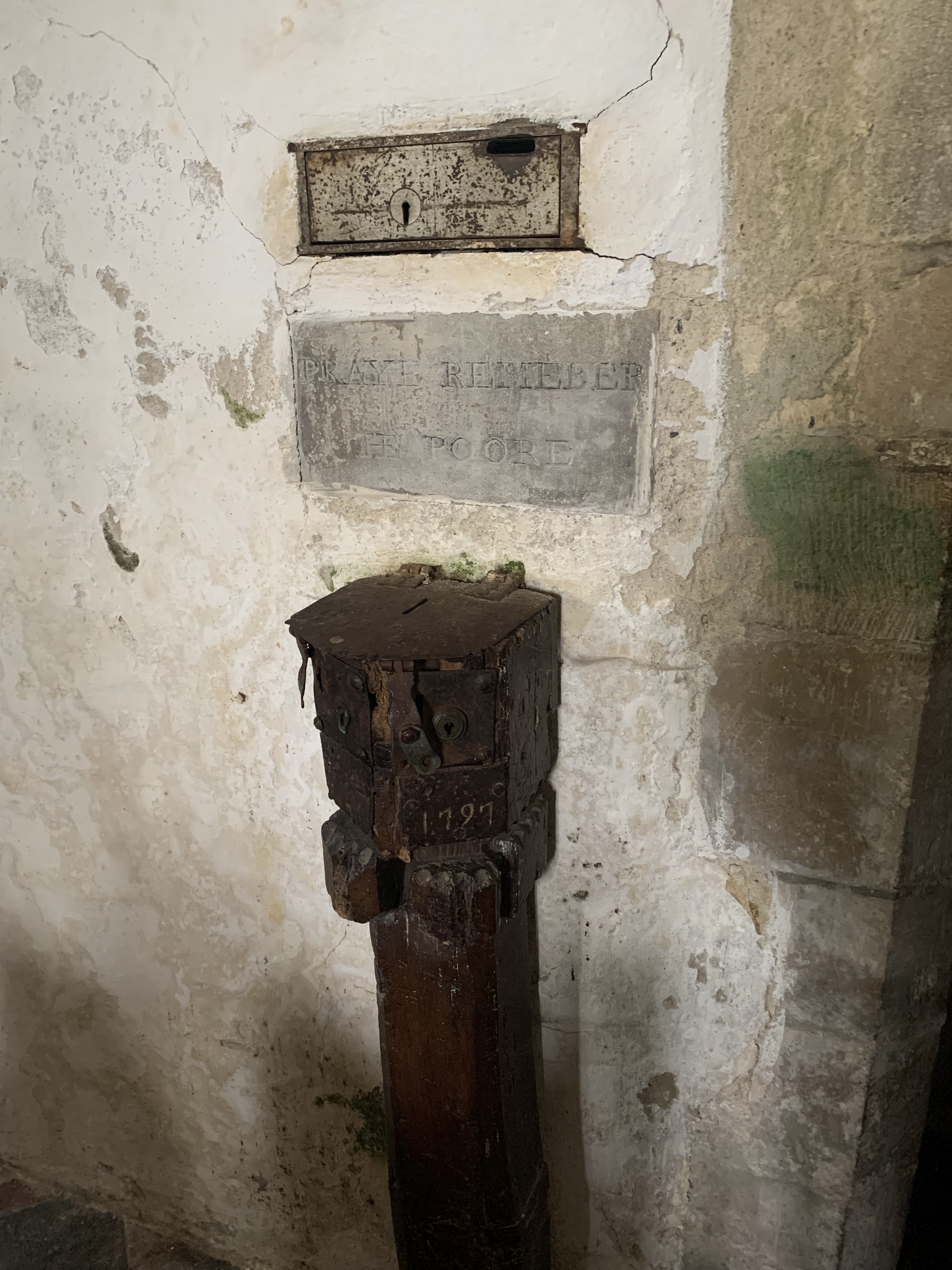
Poorbox bearing the date 1797
