= Charles-Alexis Chauvet =

French organist and composer

- Born: 7 June 1837; Marines, France
- Died: 29 January 1871 (aged 33); Argentan
- Education: Conservatoire de Paris
- Occupations: Classical organist; Composer

Charles-Alexis Chauvet (French pronunciation: [ʃaʁl alɛksi ʃovɛ]; 7 June 1837 – 29 January 1871) was a French organist and composer.

== Biography ==
Born in Marines, Charles-Alexis Chauvet made his debut at the organ of St. Remi church in Marines, only 11 years old. He entered the Conservatoire de Paris at the age of 13 to study organ with François Benoist (1st Prize of organ in 1860) and music composition with Ambroise Thomas, of which he became assistant in composition class. In 1860, he was appointed to the choir organ of the Église Saint-Thomas-d'Aquin (Paris), then to the great organ the following year. He then appeared in the gallery of the Church of Saint-Bernard de la Chapelle where he inaugurated the organ in 1863, at Notre-Dame-de-Bonne-Nouvelle, then at Saint-Merri in 1866. Finally, he was appointed titular organist of the new Cavaillé-Coll organ of the Église de la Sainte-Trinité in 1869, a position he held until his premature death at the age of 34 years of tuberculosis.

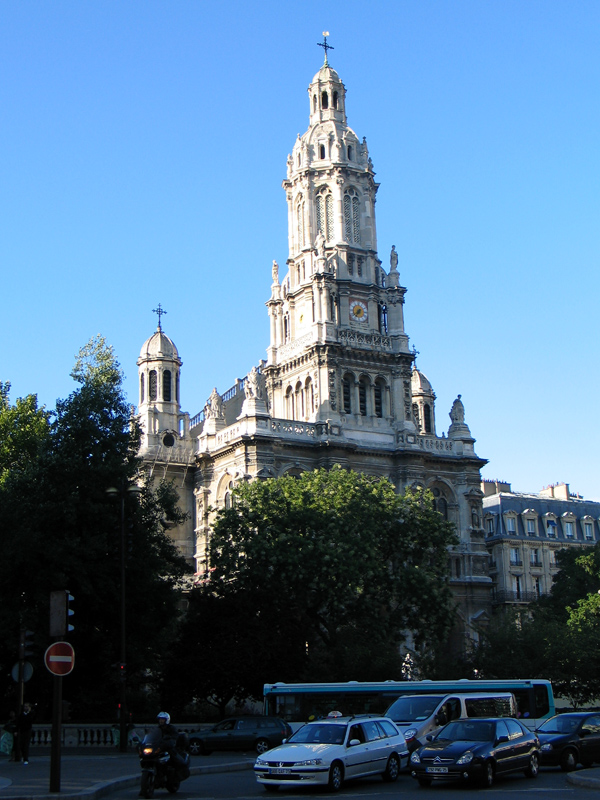
Église de la Sainte-Trinité Paris where Chauvet was titular organist from 1869 to 1871 .

Renowned for its interpretations of J. S. Bach and his improvisations, he was also regularly invited to participate in the inauguration of organs in Paris (e.g. in 1868, Notre-Dame de Paris), with Édouard Batiste, César Franck and Camille Saint-Saëns. A gifted and refined musician, he is considered one of the most brilliant composers for the organ with his friend César Franck who dedicated him his Fantaisie in C major for organ, Op. 16.

"In terms of the mechanism, Chauvet was an accomplished virtuoso; moreover, his personal way of understanding the text was that of a superior intelligence." - Henri Maréchal.

== Works ==
Grand chœur en do

- 20 Morceaux pour orgue (1863), reissued in 1896 by Théodore Dubois under the title Vingt célèbres pièces pour orgue: Grand Chorus in C major - 2. Moderato in B flat major - 3. Andantino in E major - 4. Andante in F minor - 5. Largo and Fughetta in C major - 6. Andante con moto in B minor - 7. Grand Choir in E flat major - 8. Verse in D minor - 9. Andantino in G major - 10. Grand Chorus in G minor - 11. Andantino in D minor - 12. Grand Choir in E flat major - 13. Moderato in A major - 14. Verse in A major - 15. Office des morts en D minor - 16. Allegro moderato in B flat major - 17. Andantino in B minor - 18. Andante in C minor - 19. Verse in A minor - 20. Procession of the Blessed Sacrament (religious walk) in A major.

Museum of the Organist (1863): Return to procession, Offertory in G major, Offertory in D major, Elevation 1 in F major, Elevation 2 in D major, Offertory in A minor, Elevation or Communion in A major; Prelude in G minor; Prelude in C, Elevation or Communion in F major, Offertory in C major.

- 90 Petits Versets for organ or harmonium.
- XV Études préparatoires aux œuvres de Bach for piano (1867).
- 9 Offertoires de caractères gradués pour l’Avent et le temps de Noël (1867): [without title], Li a proun de gént, Or dites-nous Marie, Noël cette journée, À la venue de Noël, Chantons de voix hautaine, Une bergère jolie, Vous qui désirez sans fin, Grâce soit rendue au Dieu de la sus.
- 20 Pieces for Organ (see list above), ed. François Sabatier and Nanon Bertrand, Publimuses PBM 18.94, 1994.
- XV Preparatory studies for Bach's works, ed. F. Sabatier, Publimuses PBM 19.94, 1994.
- 9 Graduated character offertories for Advent and Christmas time; various Pieces: Museum of Religious Music (Procession Entry), Offertoire in G major, Offertoire en D major, Elévation n° 1 in F major, Elévation n° 2 in D major, Offertoire in A minor, Elévation ou Communion en la majeur, Prelude in G minor), La Petite Maîtrise (Prélude en C minor), L'Athénée musical (Elévation ou Communion in F major), Journal des organistes de Saint-Dié (Offertoire en C major); 90 small verses, ed. F. Sabatier and N. Bertrand, Publimuses 28.97, 1997.

== Sources ==
- François Sabatier. "Chauvet, Alexis." Grove Music Online. Oxford Music Online. 21 Oct. 2010 .
