= Poling, West Sussex =

Village and parish in West Sussex, England

Coordinates: 50°49′58″N 0°31′00″W

Poling
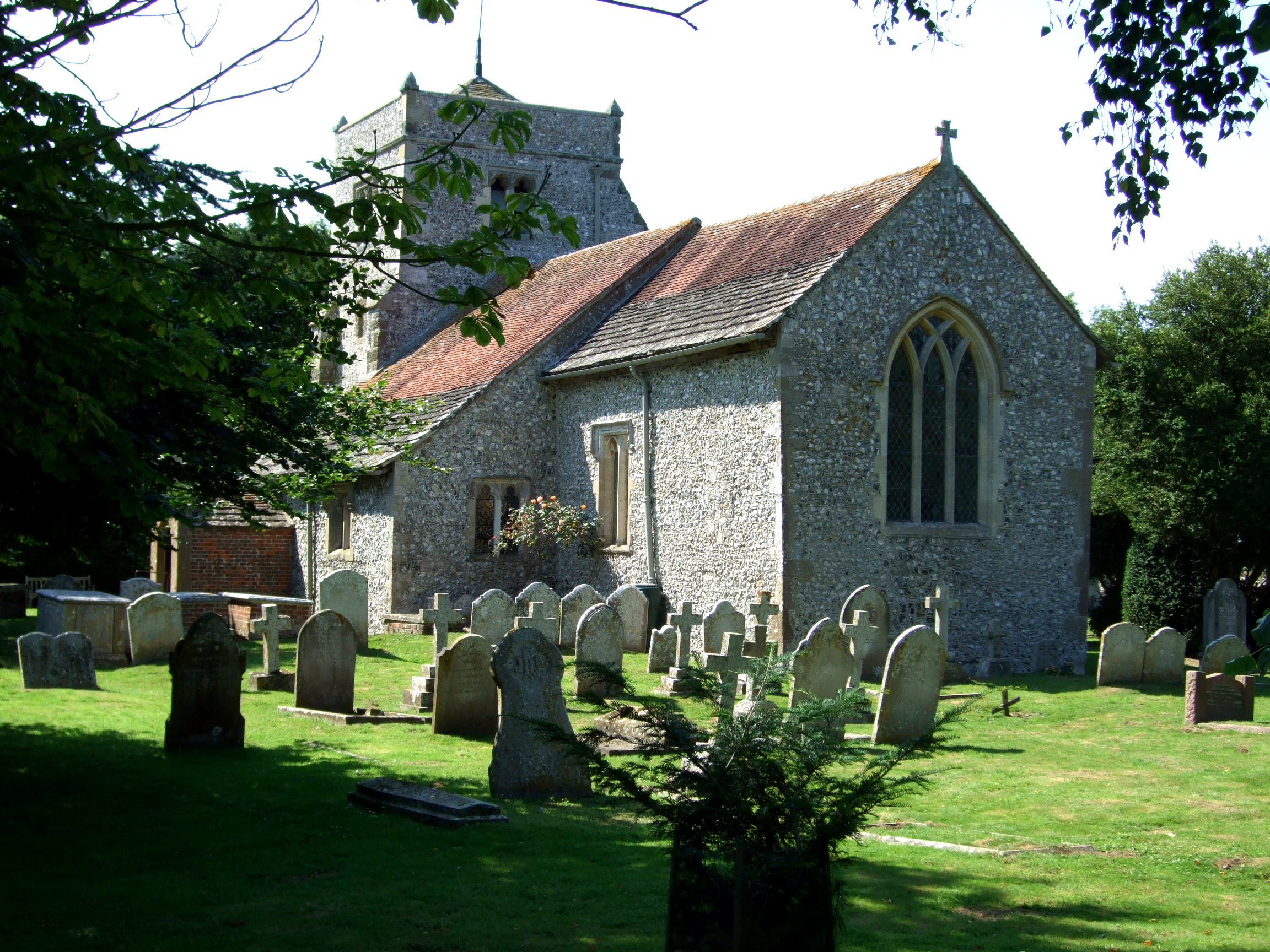
- St. Nicholas' parish church

- Location within West Sussex
- Area: 3.2 km^{2} (1.2 sq mi)
- Population: 174 (Civil Parish)
  - Density: 54/km^{2} (140/sq mi)
- OS grid reference: TQ046047
  - London: 49 miles (79 km) NNE
- Civil parish: Poling
- District: Arun
- Shire county: West Sussex
- Region: South East
- Country: England
- Sovereign state: United Kingdom
- Post town: Arundel
- Postcode district: BN18
- Dialling code: 01903
- Police: Sussex
- Fire: West Sussex
- Ambulance: South East Coast
- UK Parliament: Arundel and South Downs

Poling /pɒlɪŋ/ is a village and civil parish in the Arun District of West Sussex, England, 2 miles (3.2 km) southeast of Arundel on a minor road south of the A27. About 25% of the parish is wooded foothill slopes of the South Downs which is the area north of the A27 here.

The 2001 census recorded 173 people lived in 75 households, of whom 96 were economically active. At the 2011 Census the population had risen only marginally to 174.

The small village has two Grade I Listed buildings: the Church of England parish church of Saint Nicholas, (in whose churchyard the cricketer Colin Cowdrey is buried), and part of St John's Priory (founded by the Knights Hospitallers circa 1140) beside the main road. Many of the cottages are Grade II listed.

== History ==
Poling was an agricultural part of the Rape of Arundel, one of the traditional sub-divisions of Sussex and a former Norman barony.

In the Anglo-Saxon era Poling, like most coastal villages, had outlying areas of land in the Weald (forest) within Sussex used for summer grazing and timber production. Thus Poling gave its name to Pallingham north of Stopham and Pallinghurst west of Rudgwick. Poling also had land north of Petworth, then known as "Palinga Schittas", mentioned in a charter of AD 953. in connection with the pannage of pigs to feed on acorns.

=== Royal Air Force Station, Poling ===
RAF Poling was in use until July 1956. Thereafter, the cost of guarding the site was about £5,000, mostly before the technical equipment was removed in March 1957 when the guard was downsized; in February 1955, the wire fence was renewed for £2,000.

== Parish church ==
St. Nicholas' parish church is on the south-east edge of the village next to Manor Farm and is reached by a footpath from Poling Street, next to the Old Vicarage.

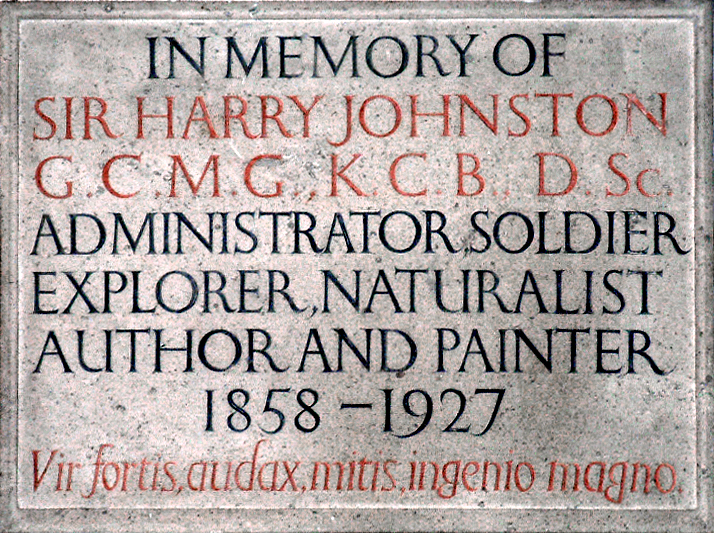
Wall plaque commemorating Sir Harry Johnston in St. Nicholas' parish church, designed and cut by Eric Gill

Burials in St. Nicholas' churchyard include the Kent and MCC cricketer and cricket administrator Colin Cowdrey (1932–2000) and the explorer, botanist, artist and colonial administrator Sir Harry Johnston (1858–1927), who lived at St John's Priory. Johnston is also commemorated by a wall plaque in the nave carved by the Arts and Crafts sculptor and typeface designer Eric Gill, who lived at Ditchling, East Sussex. The main typeface used on the plaque seems to be Gill's Perpetua, which he designed in 1925 but did not release until 1929. The lower-case typeface used for the Latin quote below is not presently recognised.

== Sources and further reading ==
- Jerrome, Peter (2002). Petworth. From the beginnings to 1660. The Window Press. p. 15.
- Nairn, Ian; Pevsner, Nikolaus (1965). Sussex. The Buildings of England. Harmondsworth: Penguin Books. pp. 308–309. ISBN 0-14-071028-0.
- Page, William, ed. (1973). A History of the County of Sussex, Volume 2. Victoria County History. p. 93.
