= Argentan Abbey =

Benedictine abbey in Argentan, France

Coordinates: 48°44′13″N 0°00′55″W

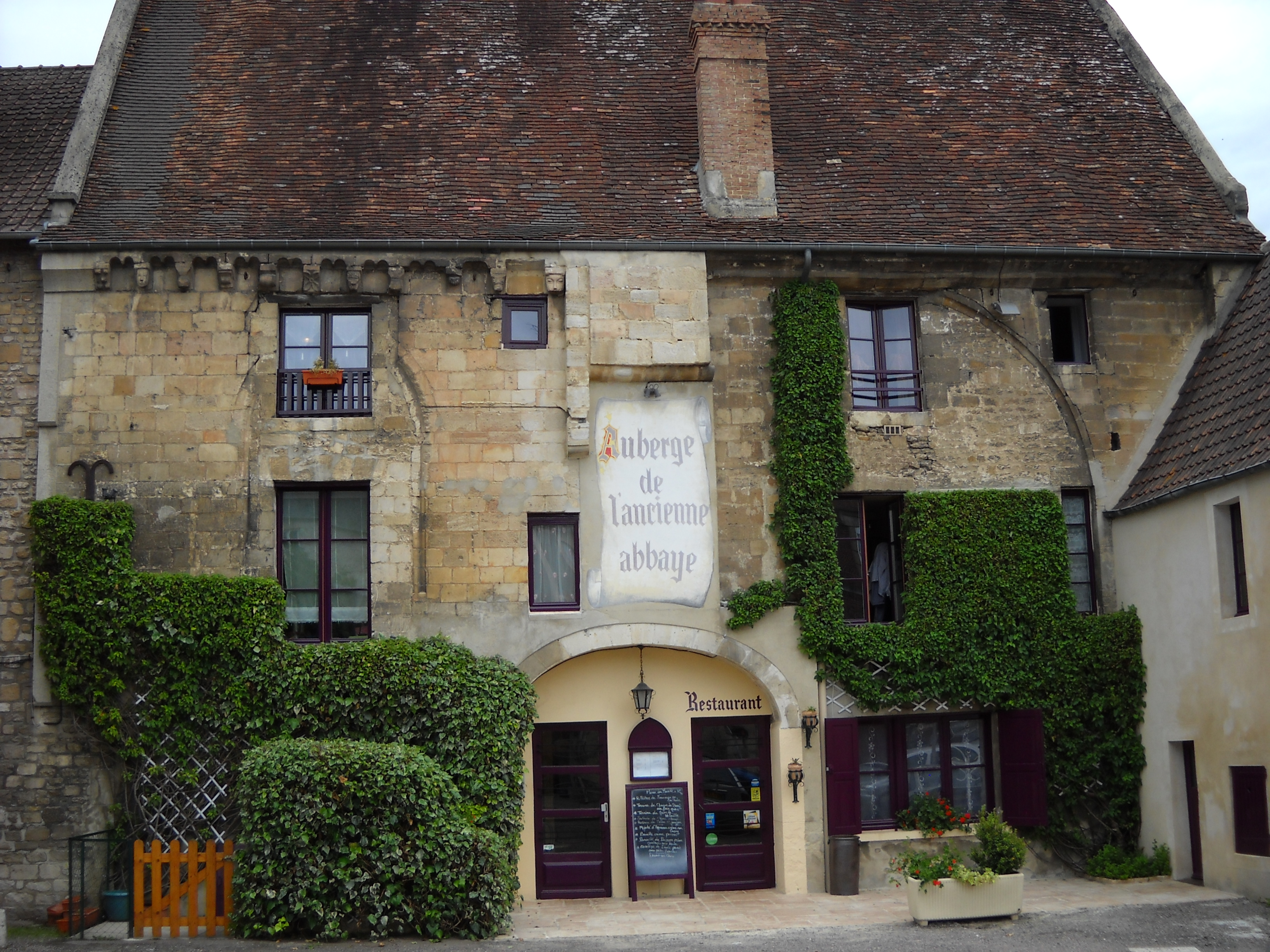
Argentan - Abbaye Notre-Dame de la Place

Argentan Abbey otherwise Notre-Dame de la Place (French: Abbaye Notre-Dame d'Argentan;Abbaye Notre-Dame de la Place) is an 11th-century Benedictine abbey in Argentan, France. It is now a restaurant.

A community of nuns transferred here from Almenêches Abbey in 1736 but were dispersed during the French Revolution. They reassembled at Vimoutiers in 1822 and finally returned to Argentan in 1830. As a result of fighting during World War II, the nuns were forced to flee to Sées from 1944 to 1958.

It was listed as a Monument historique in 1986.

== See also ==
- List of Benedictine monasteries in France
