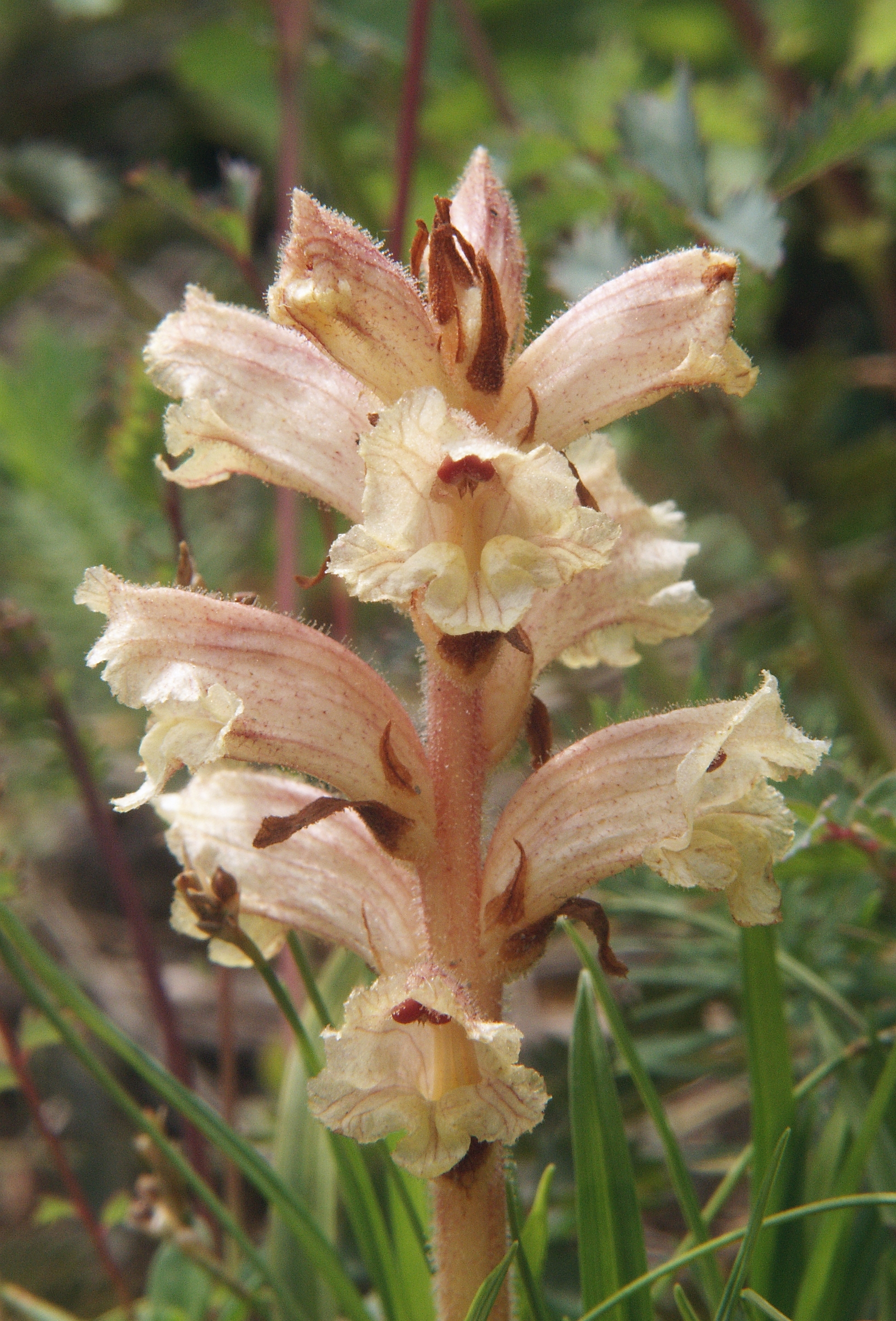
- Orobanche alba in Tauberland, Germany

Conservation status
- Least Concern (IUCN 3.1)

Scientific classification
- Kingdom: Plantae
- Clade: Embryophytes
- Clade: Tracheophytes
- Clade: Spermatophytes
- Clade: Angiosperms
- Clade: Eudicots
- Clade: Asterids
- Order: Lamiales
- Family: Orobanchaceae
- Genus: Orobanche
- Species: O. alba

Binomial name
- Orobanche alba Steph. ex Willd., 1800

Subspecies
- Orobanche alba cuprea; Orobanche alba xanthostigma

Synonyms
- Orobanche epitymum DC. in Lamarck & Candolle; Orobanche alexandri Tin. in Guss.

= Orobanche alba =

Species of flowering plant in the broomrape family

Orobanche alba, also known by its common names thyme broomrape and red broomrape, is a holoparasitic plant of the broomrape family. It parasitises plants from the mint family.

It is native to countries across Europe, the Middle East, Asia, and North Africa. As Orobanche alba is polymorphic and has been relatively poorly studied, there is often uncertainty over taxonomy and classification.

== Description ==
Orobanche alba is a short reddish annual with simple flowering stems. They grow between 8–25 centimetres (3.1–9.8 inches) tall. Plants have fragrant flowers, cylindrical campanulate (bell-shaped) corolla with dark glands, and calyx teeth which are usually 'entire' (consisting of a single piece).

The plant generally flowers from May to June (though in rare cases it flowering can occur into early September) and is pollinated by bumblebees.

=== Subspecies ===
Orobanche alba has four accepted infraspecific names:

- Orobanche alba subsp. alba: Originally described as Orobanche rubra. It generally parasitises plants from Thymus and has fewer, smaller flowers which are in bloom from May to June.
- Orobanche alba subsp. cuprea: First reported in 1879 by Pierre Edmond Boissier and Benjamin Balansa, it was originally described as a separate species Orobanche cuprea. It differs due to its conspicuous yellow folds on the lower lip of each flower as well as its consistently white stigma. Orobanche alba subsp. cuprea is found in Cyprus and in some parts of southern Turkey.
- Orobanche alba subsp. major: First described in 1871 by Ladislav Josef Čelakovský as a separate species, Orobanche epithymum. It generally parasitises plants from Salvia and has more, larger light-coloured flowers which have more open throats and longer petals and leaves. The flowers are in bloom from June to July.
- Orobanche alba subsp. xanthostigma: Described in 2004 by Stefan Rätzel and Holger Uhlich. Orobanche alba subsp. xanthostigma differs due to having consistently yellow stigma, free calyx segments, and differing filaments. The form typica has more or less normal colouring whereas for the form sineglandulosa the whole plant is "wax-like yellow" and with less visible glandules.

A study published in Acta Biologica Cracoviensia found that molecular tests "did not clearly explain" the relationships between O. alba subsp. alba and O. alba subsp. major and suggested that they should be considered forms of O. alba rather than subspecies.

== Habitat ==
Orobanche alba is usually found on dry sunny slopes, steppes, subalpine and alpine grasslands, growing in calcareous, alkaline, sandy or loamy soil.

It parasitises plants from the mint family. It is a known parasite of plants from several genera: Thymus and Salvia most commonly, but also Clinopodium, Acinos, Origanum, Satureja, and Stachys. As Orobanche species can only parasitise certain plants, seeds must come into contact with chemical signals (such as strigolactones) from the roots of the host plant in order to germinate.

== Distribution ==
=== Africa ===
Orobanche alba can be found in north-west Africa and is native to Morocco and Algeria.

=== Asia ===
Orobanche alba is native to countries throughout the Middle East and Asia including Turkey, Iraq, Iran, Afghanistan, Pakistan and parts of China.

=== Europe ===
Orobanche alba is found across Europe, including in Ireland, southern Belgium, central Germany, the island of Gotland and south eastern Poland.

O. alba is "locally abundant" on Sicily, occurring on the mountains on the north coast from Monte Erice to Monte Catalfano, on Etna, and on the Nebrodi and Peloritani ranges as well as inland near Ciminna.

==== United Kingdom ====
In the United Kingdom, O. alba has been found most commonly in Cornwall (especially near Kynance Cove), northern England, Northern Ireland and particularly prolifically in western Scotland. It is also present in the west of Ireland. The highest record was made at Nappa Scar, Wensleydale at around 490 metres (1,610 feet). Populations are said to vary significantly from year to year, but overall appear stable; however numbers in northern England have become "consistently ... critically low". The 2014 Red List for England rated Orobanche alba as "Least Concern" over the period 1930 to 1999, but noted a 59% decline in records since 1987 when pre-1930 historic sightings were included.
