= Almenêches Abbey =

Benedictine nunnery in France

- abbaye d'Almenêches
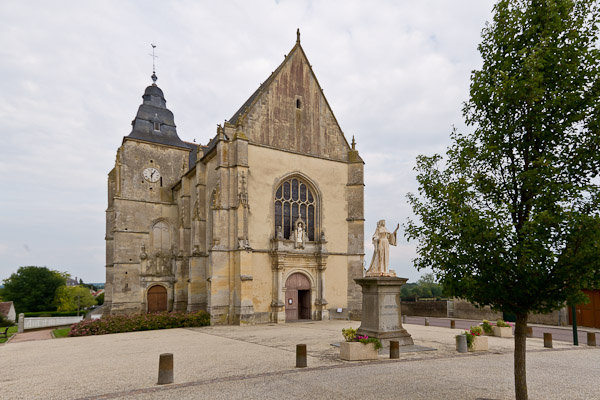
- Church of Almenêches Abbey

- Location within Lower Normandy

Monastery information
- Order: Benedictine
- Established: 6th century
- Reestablished: c. 1063

People
- Founder: Roger of Montgomery

Architecture
- Heritage designation: Monument historique
- Designated date: 1948

Site
- Coordinates: 48°41′50.5″N 0°6′39.5″E

Almenêches Abbey (French: Abbaye d'Almenêches) was a Benedictine nunnery at Almenêches in Orne, Normandy, France. It was founded in the 6th century, but had been abandoned by the 10th century. Roger of Montgomery refounded it sometime between 1063 and 1066.

== History ==
During the Anglo-Norman civil war, upon hearing the abbey was being used by Duke Robert Curthose as a stable, Robert of Bellême burned it down. The abbess, Bellême's sister Emma, fled with her sister nuns; they were temporarily accommodated in surrounding houses or at the Abbey of Saint-Evroul. The following year Emma had the abbey at Almenêches rebuilt. It subsequently suffered another fire under Abbess Matilda, Emma's successor, and a third one after 1308.

== Episcopal visit ==
In 1260, Archbishop Eudes Rigaud noted the refectory was not in use; the nuns ate in groups of twos and threes in private rooms. He ordered them to cease this activity and eat in the refectory. Eudes also noted that the nuns ran up debts in the town and that some of the nuns even had children. The nuns also failed to live a communal life, did not attend Matins or Compline, and allowed seculars to visit the nunnery. Eudes admits to finding the nunnery in disarray, explaining he did not have the time to fix every problem he encountered. Instead, Eudes ordered their bishop to instruct their abbess on the proper life for the nuns.

== Closure ==
In 1736, the community was transferred to Argentan Abbey. During the French Revolution the Abbey church was then used to manufacture saltpeter. Restoration of the church was carried out between 1864 and 1887 by architect Ruprich-Robert.

In 1948 the church was listed as a Monument historique.

== Sources ==
- Green, Judith A. (1999). Harper-Bill, Christopher (ed.). "Robert Curthose Reassessed". Anglo-Norman Studies XXII: Proceedings of the Battle Conference. The Boydell Press.
- Hicks, Leonie V. (2007). Religious Life in Normandy, 1050–1300: Space, Gender and Social Pressure. The Boydell Press.
- Johnson, Penelope D. (1991). Equal in Monastic Profession: Religious Women in Medieval France. University of Chicago Press.
- Power, Eileen (1922). Medieval English Nunneries, c. 1275 to 1535. Cambridge University Press.
- Davis, Adam Jeffrey (2006). The Holy Bureaucrat: Eudes Rigaud and Religious Reform in Thirteenth-century Normandy. Cornell University Press. pp. 53–54.
