= Édouard Batiste =

French composer and organist

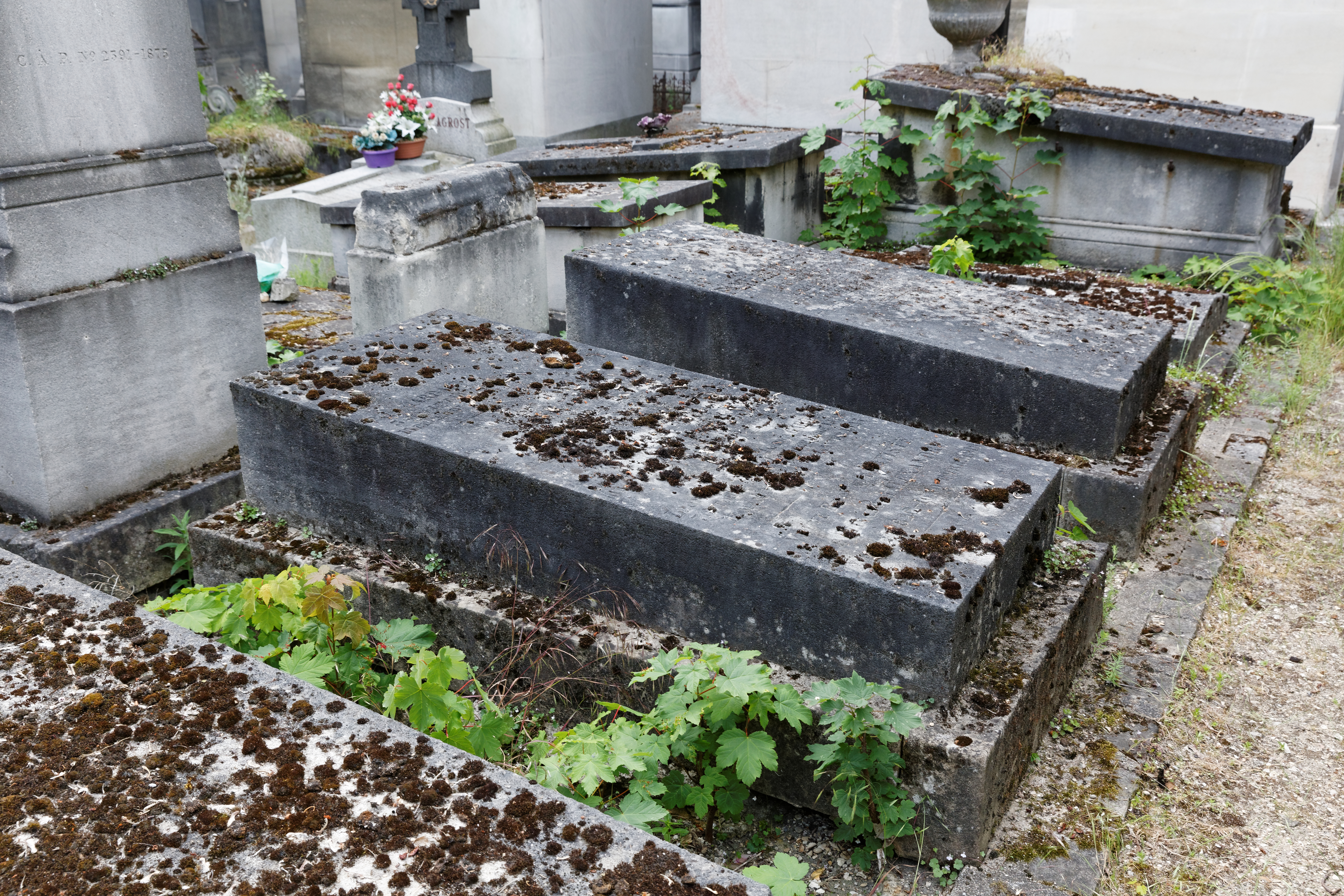
Grave at Père Lachaise Cemetery

Édouard Batiste (French pronunciation: [edwaʁ batist]; 28 March 1820 – 9 November 1876) was a French composer and organist.

== Career ==
Batiste was born in Paris and studied at the Conservatory as a teenager, winning prizes in solfège, harmony and accompaniment, counterpoint and fugue, and organ. In 1840, he won the Prix de Rome together with François Bazin.

In 1842, he became the organist at the church of Saint-Nicolas-des-Champs in Paris, where he remained for twelve years, before becoming organist at Saint-Eustache Church. While at Saint-Eustache, he performed the organ in the premiere of Hector Berlioz's Te Deum in April 1855, conducted by the composer.

He died in Paris aged 56.

His students included Edward Morris Bowman, composer Léo Delibes, who was also his nephew, and Joseph Lennon.
