= Siege of Soissons (1414) =

- Part of the Armagnac-Burgundian Civil War in the Hundred Years' War
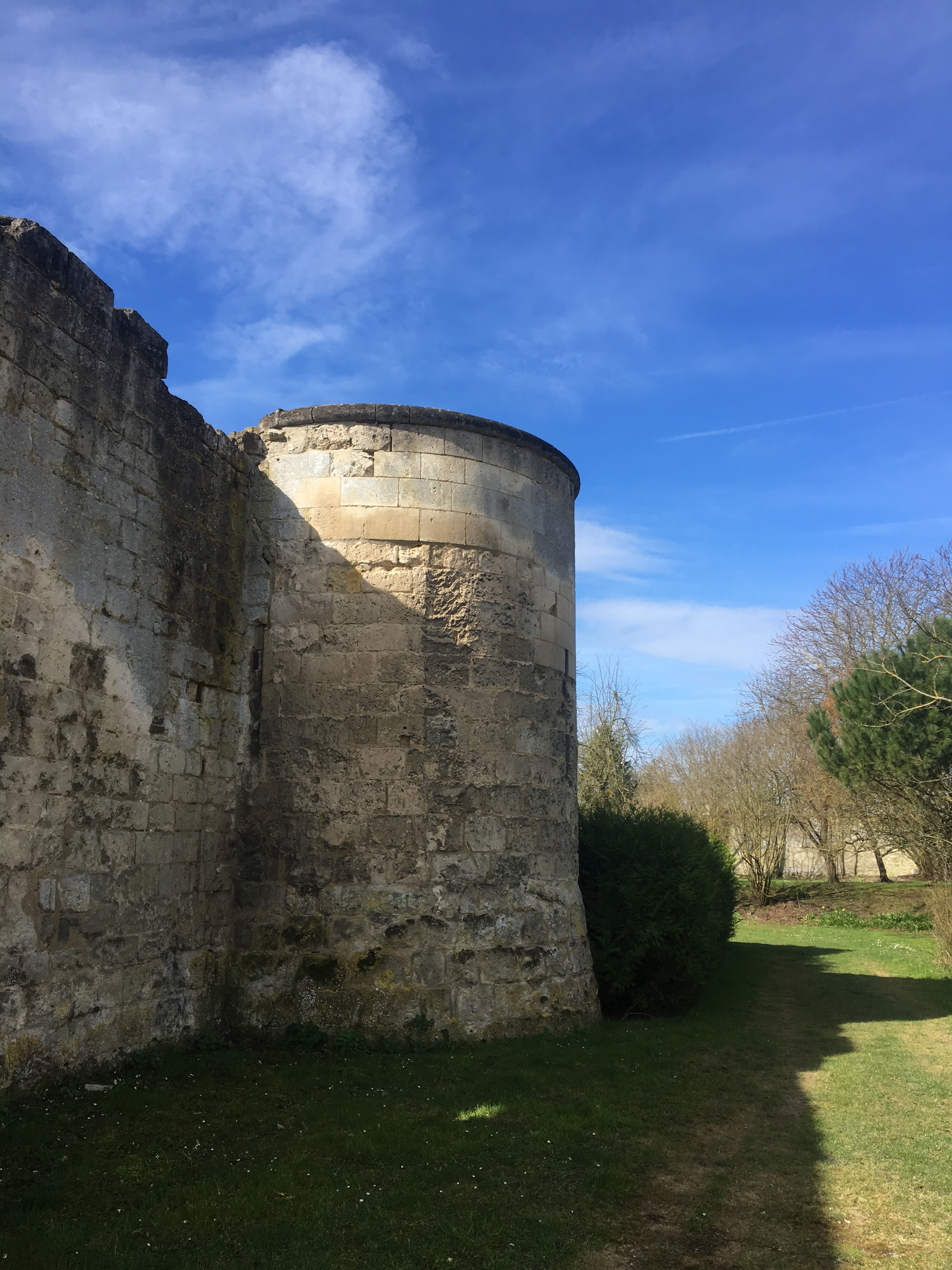
- A stone bastion at the Abbey of Saint-Médard de Soissons
| Date | 11 May 1414 - 21 May 1414 (10 days) |
| Location | Soissons, County of Soissons, France (today Picardy, France) |
| Result | Armagnac-Royal victory |
| Territorial changes | Soissons fell into Armagnacs' control. |

Belligerents
| Kingdom of France (royal forces); Armagnacs | Burgundians; Kingdom of England (mercenaries) |

Commanders and leaders
| King Charles VI of France; Dauphin Louis; Charles I, Duke of Orléans; Bernard VII, Count of Armagnac; Charles I d'Albret; John I, Duke of Bourbon; Edward III, Duke of Bar; John I, Duke of Alençon; Clignet de Brabant (fr); Amé I de Sarrebruck-Commercy (fr); Hector, bastard of Bourbon †; Raymonnet de la Guerre; Tanneguy III du Châtel; Arthur, Count of Richmond; Louis VII, Duke of Bavaria-Ingolstadt; Louis, Count of Vendôme; James II, Count of La Marche; Charles of Artois, Count of Eu; Jacques de Châtillon, Lord of Dampierre; Robert of Bar, Count of Marle; John VI of Pierrepont, Count of Roucy; Bureau III, Lord of La Rivière; Aymé de Sallebruche; Philip, Count of Vertus; Jean de Montaigu, Archbishop of Sens; Jean de Roucy, bishop of Laon | Enguerrand de Bournonville (executed); John, Lord of Saint-Léger (POW); Pierre de Ménau (executed); Bouton (unknown, possibly Jean or Philippe) (POW); Simon de Craon, Lord of Clacy (defected); Collart de Phiennes (POW); Lamon de Launoy (POW); Guy Le Bouteiller (POW); Old Lord de Ménau (POW) |

Strength
| Estimated about 3,000 to 5,000 men-at-arms Heavy cannons and trebuchets Total: About 8,000 to 10,000 men (according to Jonathan Sumption) | About 500-600 men-at-arms, including contingents from the Boulonnais, Picardy and Artois. About 200-300 English longbowmen fought as mercenaries. Total: About 700-800 men. |

Casualties and losses
| Minimal knights and men-at-arms killed. | Most of the men-at-arms died during the assault or drowned escaping in the Aisne river, including Hector, bastard of Bourbon, almost all English longbowmen in the garrison was executed by hanging on a gibbet. Enguerrand de Bournonville, Pierre de Ménau was executed and other commanders were held prisoner and was released, escaped or ransomed. |
- Heavy civilian casaulties, total of 1,200 civilian deaths, caused by indiscriminant massacres and violence of the Armagnac-Royal forces, including violations of inhabitants, religious infastructures, relics, nuns (especially) and clergy. Civilians survived the massacres died by starvation and exposure. Wealthy citizens were sent to Paris for imprisonment.

The Siege of Soissons took place between 11 and 21 May 1414 during the Armagnac–Burgundian Civil War, part of the Hundred Years' War. An Armagnac-Royal army, led by King Charles VI but commanded by Dauphin Louis, Duke of Guyenne, Charles I, Duke of Orléans, Constable Charles I d'Albret, and many other nobles, besieged the city to reclaim it from a Burgundian garrison who had just occupied the city after the failure of the Cabochien Revolt. The city, a strategic stronghold in Picardy, was held by the veteran commander, Enguerrand de Bournonville, on behalf of John the Fearless, Duke of Burgundy.

== Background ==
In 1413, during the Armagnac-Burgundian Civil War, the Burgundians had lost Paris as a result of the Cabochien Revolt, putting control of the Kingdom of France's government into Armagnacs' hands as they lost the positions of the major offices of the kingdom. In 1414, John the Fearless, Duke of Burgundy, decided to try and recapture the city and sent three of his chamberlains, Enguerrand de Bournonville, Antoine de Craon and Jean de Moreuil, to occupy the fotress of Soissons, which enclosure was flanked by 20 towers, managing to do on 2 February 1414. After an unsuccessful attempt to recapture Paris from the Armagnacs, John the Fearless retreated to Artois in mid February, making Bournonville the captain of Soissons. He reinforced its defences, demolished buildings too close to the ramparts, blocked the streets with chains and looted the neighbouring countryside for supplies to stop such resources falling into the hands of a besieging force.

After taking Paris, the Armagnacs assembled a sizeable army, including many nobles and the Royal forces under the presence and commands of King Charles VI and Dauphin Louis, Duke of Guyenne, near Saint-Denis. Then on 10 May 1414, the Armagnac-Royal forces departed and marched into Picardy and Artois, captured Compiègne and marched to Soissons.

== Battle ==
On 11 May 1414, the Armagnac-Royal forces, composed of about 8,000 to 10,000 men, with its vanguard, led by Edward III, Duke of Bar, Clignet de Brabant (fr), Amé I de Sarrebruck-Commercy (fr), Bernard VII, Count of Armagnac, Hector, bastard of Bourbon, Arthur de Richemont and Raymonet de la Guerre. and many heavy siege engines, arrived at the fortress of Soissons and surrounded it on all sides, cutting any all supply lines, signifying that the town was rebelling against the Crown. The King camped at the convent of St Jean des Vignes of the Order of Saint Augustine, while Charles I, Duke of Orléans and Dauphin Louis, Duke of Guyenne stayed at the Abbey of St Quintin. The besiegers sent ambassador to demand the town's surrender. However, Enguerrand de Bournonville, believing the city was well-defended, refused the demand, and a siege ensued. The inhabitants of Soissons, perceiving that they should be besieged, acted like to those of Compiègne, in destroying their suburbs, with many noble buildings, churches and houses.

On the next days, Constable Charles I d'Albret positioned the cannons and trebuchets against the gates and the weakest sections of the wall. They bombarded the fortress, and conducted frequent night raids which greatly weakened the walls of Soissons. The suburbs and the Abbey of Saint-Médard de Soissons surrendered. During the bombardments, on 20 May, captain Hector, bastard of Bourbon, the illegitimate son of Louis II, Duke of Bourbon, while parleying with Enguerrand de Bournonville, was hit by a crossbow bolt into the head, and died in the same day. This action enraged John I, Duke of Bourbon - who much loved his half-brother, Dauphin Louis, and many other men in the Armagnac-Royal besieging forces. This was painfully felt throughout the royal camp - crossbows allowed even a peasant to kill an aristocrat, disrupting the social order and the laws of war, and so the Church banned them, though that ban was largely ignored thanks to their military effectiveness.

On the night of 20–21 May, Enguerrand de Bournonville decided to flee the town, upon the enragements of the Armagnac-Royal forces. However, captain Simon de Craon, Lord of Clacy, then on the process of defecting, prevented this. This created confusion among the town and the Burgundian garrison.

Before the final assault on 21 May, Louis VII, Duke of Bavaria-Ingolstadt and Arthur de Richemont was knighted.

On 21 May, enraged by the death of Hector and the confusion of the enemies, the Armagnac-Royal forces conducted a vigorously and brutally full-scale assault on all sides of the town, which took 2 hours. The vanguard, made their attack at the same time; and the princes and leaders urged their men on with such bravery, that in spite of the obstinate resistance of the besieged, the King's forces made an entry by a large breach which had been effected by the engines, and there the combat raged, for every inch was disputed with lances, battle-axes and swords, hand to hand. During the storm, the commander of the English mercenary forces within the town, having held a parley with some of his countrymen mercenaries in the King's army, caused a gate leading to the Aisne river to be cut down, through which the Count of Armagnac's men rushed, and climbed on the highest tower and raised the banner of their count. The greater part of the English forces suddenly turned against the townsmen. Soon after, the army forced an entrance through the walls, and attack indiscriminantly on the people they saw, whether inhabitants or troops. During this attack, as Enguerrand de Bournouville was riding through different parts of the town, to encourage his men, he was pursued through a narrow street which had a chain thrown across it by some of the men of captain Raymonnet de la Guerre, who pressed on him so much that he was forced to retreat and attempt to leap over the chain; but, in so doing, his horse could not clear it, and remained suspended, when he was made prisoner and was shown to Raymonnnet. The others, seeing the town was taken, retired to different parts within the gates, and the towers of the walls, whence, parleying with their enemies, they surrendered, on promise of their lives being spared. Those who defended their posts were slain or made prisoners. In short, 200 men were killed or taken prisoner, including the townsmen with the Burgundian garrison. During the assault, the enraged Duke of Bourbon found the crossbowman who killed the Bastard of Bourbon, and ordered him to be hanged by the testicles.

During the storming of the place, several, foreseeing that the city's fell, thought to save themselves by escaping over the walls to the Aisne river, and swimming across; but the greater part were drowned, as their bodies were found in divers parts of the stream. Some women of rank were, however, in this disorder conducted to the quarters of the King and the Dauphin by their friends, and thus saved from suffering the like infamy with others who could not escape from the place.

== Aftermath ==
Enguerrand de Bournonville, Pierre de Ménau with two other masters, the English contigent and many other Burgundian troops captured were executed. The rest were imprisoned or pardoned. Before being executed, Bournonville made a request, to raise and drink the cup of wine, to the Duke of Burgundy's health, and death to all of his enemies. One of two of the men were pardoned, including Guillaume de Crannes thanks to a request from John I, Duke of Alençon.

John the Fearless, saddened by Bournonville's death, had a mass for his soul and immediately handed his post as castellan of Éperlecques to Bournonville's twelve-year-old son, Antoine de Bournonville. Enguerrand de Monstrelet, a pro-Burgundian chronicler from Picardy, stated that he was the flower of all the captains of France, with Burgundian courtly literatures emphasized his heroism and fidelity.

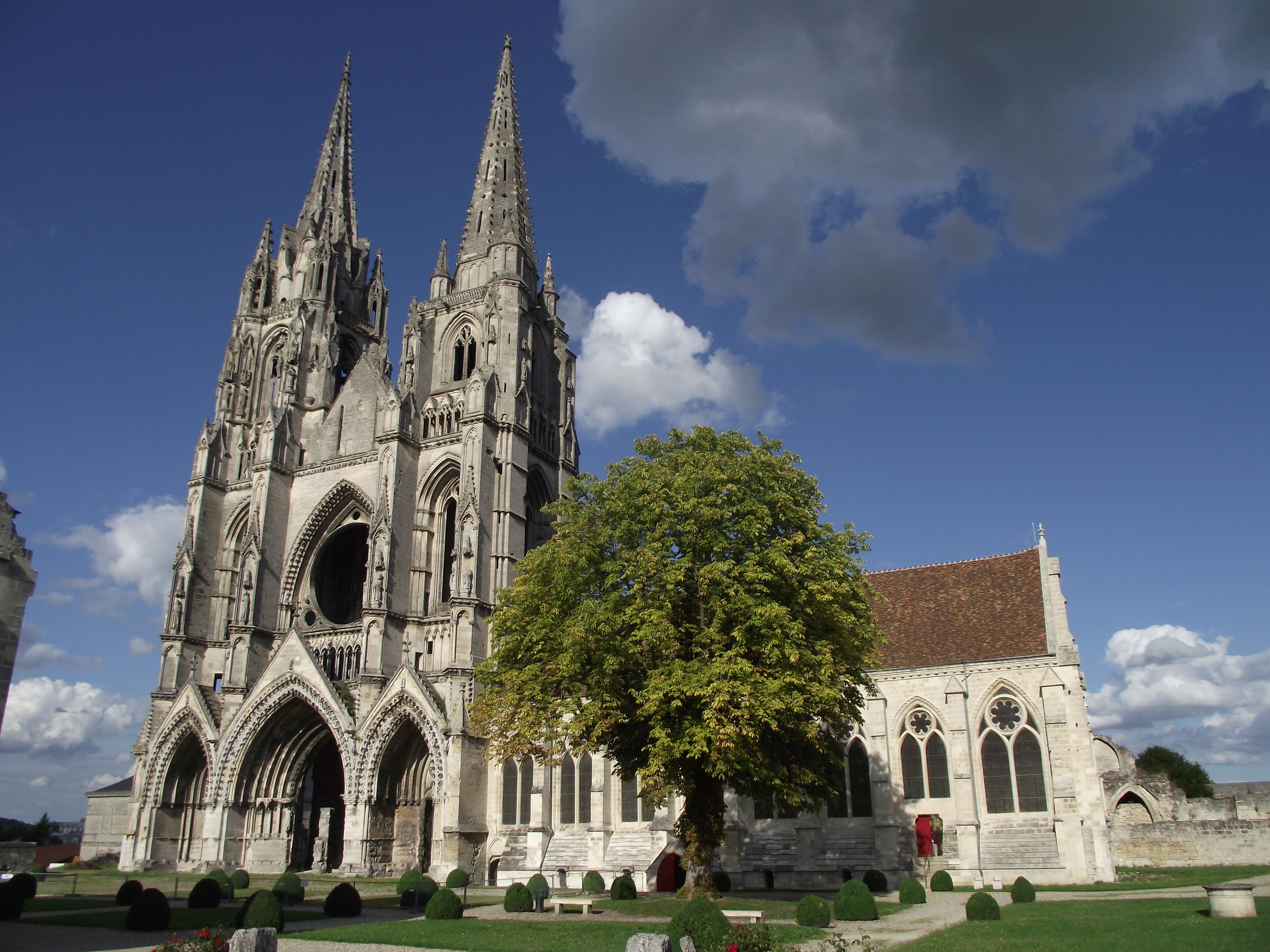
The abbey of Saint-Jean-des-Vignes. Where King Charles VI of France stayed during the siege.

After Soissons capitulated into the Armagnacs' hands, the Armagnac-Royal Army then marched up to Tierrache, Ribermont, Saint-Quentin, Peronne, besieged Baupaume. Then finally, marched to Artois and besieged Arras. However, the citizens of Arras well fortified the city, and repelled the besiegers.

On the feast day of Saint John the Baptist, when the Armagnac-Royal force had arrived and was besieging Arras, Anthony, Duke of Brabant, Margaret, Duchess consort of Bavaria-Straubing and deputies from the three estates of Flanders negotiated with the King and the Dauphin to sign a truce with the Duke of Burgundy. The truce was agreed, and concluded at Senlis. After that, the King and the Dauphin re-entered triumphantly into Paris. The treaty was a large political victory for the Burgundians.
