= Siege of Arras (1414) =

French history

- Part of the Armagnac-Burgundian Civil War in the Hundred Years' War
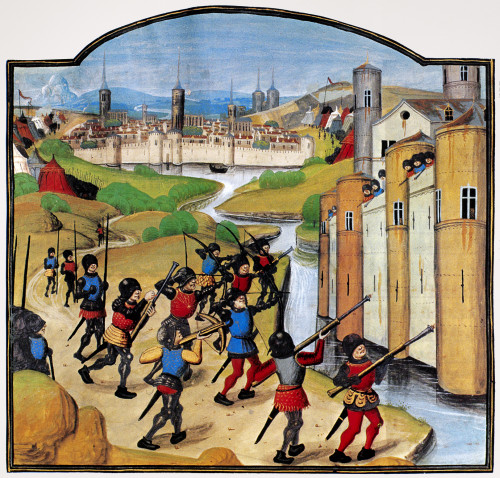
- An illuminated manuscript by chronicler [[Enguerrand de Monstrelet]] depicting the siege
Date	20 July 1414 - 4 September 1414
Location	Arras, County of Artois, France (today Pas-de-Calais, France)
Result	The Armagnacs failed to take Arras.; Siege lifted.; Treaty of Arras (1414) between the Armagnacs and the Burgundians.

Belligerents
Armagnacs Kingdom of France (royal forces)	Burgundians

Commanders and leaders
King Charles VI of France; Dauphin Louis; Charles I, Duke of Orléans; Bernard VII, Count of Armagnac; Charles I d'Albret; John I, Duke of Bourbon; Edward III, Duke of Bar; John I, Duke of Alençon; Clignet de Brabant; Amé I de Sarrebruck-Commercy #; Tanneguy III du Châtel; Arthur, Count of Richmond; Louis VII, Duke of Bavaria-Ingolstadt; Louis, Count of Vendôme; James II, Count of La Marche; Charles of Artois, Count of Eu; Raymonnet de la Guerre; Jacques de Châtillon, Lord of Dampierre; Robert of Bar, Count of Marle; John VI of Pierrepont, Count of Roucy; Bureau III, Lord of La Rivière; Aymé de Sallebruche; Philip, Count of Vertus; Jean de Montaigu, Archbishop of Sens; Jean de Roucy, bishop of Laon; Louis Bourdon	John II of Luxembourg-Ligny; Guillaume de Bonnières; Philippe de Beaufort; John the Fearless, Duke of Burgundy; Hector de Saveuse; John I, Seigneur of Croÿ et d'Araines, Baron of Renty and of Seneghem; Gautier de Ruppes; Jean de Rupelle; John, Seigneur of Fosseux; John, Sire of Jumont; Jean de Charlon, Sire of Vitteaux; Jean de Meschastel, Lord of Montagu

Strength
Total of about 20,000 to 30,000 men.	Large garrison of defenders (unknown number of troops). Reinforcements: 4,000 men.

Casualties and losses
Unknown losses: Numerous cases and deaths of dysentery.; The vanguard lost at least 50 men killed or captured, and another 15-20 men drowned in the river.; At least 240 captured and made prisoner.	Unknown losses: At least 20 men killed or captured.; Greater numbers of the Burgundian garrison's best horses killed.

The Siege of Arras (1414) took place between 20 July and 4 September 1414 during the Armagnac–Burgundian Civil War, part of the Hundred Years' War. A sizable Armagnac-Royal Army, led by King Charles VI, Dauphin Louis, Charles I, Duke of Orléans, Bernard VII, Count of Armagnac, Constable Charles I d'Albret, and many other nobles, besieged the city of Arras, the capital of the County of Artois, which was under Burgundian control. The city was well-defended by a citizens with a large Burgundian garrison under John II of Luxembourg-Ligny and Guillaume de Bonnières. After six weeks of dysentery spread throughout the Armagnac-Royal Army and the resistance of the Burgundians, the siege was lifted on 4 September 1414 with the signing of the peace Treaty of Arras (1414) between the two parties.

== Background ==
In 1413, during the Armagnac-Burgundian Civil War, the Burgundians had lost Paris as a result of the Cabochien Revolt, putting the control of the Kingdom of France's government into Armagnacs' hands as the Burgundians lost the positions of the major offices of the kingdom. In 1414, after a failed attempt to recapture the capital, John the Fearless, Duke of Burgundy, retreated to Artois in mid February.

After taking Paris, the Armagnacs assembled a sizable army, including many nobles and the Royal forces under the presence and commands of King Charles VI and Dauphin Louis, near Saint-Denis. After assembled, they marched to Picardy and Artois, captured Compiègne, besieged Soissons, where they executed Enguerrand de Bournonville, one of the brilliant and reliable generals in the Burgundian army. After taking Soissons, they marched up to Tierrache, Ribermont, Saint-Quentin, Péronne, besieged Baupaume. Finally, they marched to Artois and reached Arras on 20 July.

From 30 June to 1 July, while the King and the Dauphin was at Péronne, Margaret, Duchess consort of Bavaria-Straubing and Anthony, Duke of Brabant, accompanied by some chief citizens of the Quatre Mestiers as deputies from the three estates of Flanders, negotiated with them to make peace with their brother, the Duke of Burgundy. However, negotiations failed and when Margaret and Anthony announced this to John at Douai, he retreated into the County of Flanders.

Before the Armagnac-Royal forces arrived at Arras, the citizens had expected their city to be besieged. Therefore, they made great preparations to defend themselves, the erected bulwarks without the walls, formed barriers of large oak trees placed on one another with deep ditches, so that the wall could not be reached by the Armagnac-Royal forces before passing these initial traps and obstacles. Next, the inhabitants planted cannons, veuglaires, and other offensive engines on the walls and towers of the city, to annoy and halt back the besiege forces.

John II of Luxembourg-Ligny was appointed govener-general of the city, have with him many expert captains. He announced any family who had wives and children should quickly bring them to the other towns nearby in the Burgundian territory. After then, he ordered to demolish many beautiful buildings and churches in Arras, burnt the suburb of Baudemont, including houses and inns, to the confusion of the suburb's inhabitants.

== Siege ==
King Charles VI, with his forces arrived at Arras on 20 May, lodged in a house at the nearby town of Vailly, which had belonged to the Knight Templars, with Dauphin Louis, Duke of Guyenne lodged very near to him. Soon after, in the early morning, John I, Duke of Bourbon, and others troops of the vanguard division, lodged into the suburb of Vaudemont, after defeating severe resistance of the Burgundians from Arras. During his lodge, before the gates of the city, the Armagnac-Royal forces skirmished with the Burgundian forces of the city, and the Burgundians captured 60 or more men as prisoners, with a quantity of baggage. The total number of men in the vanguard of the Armagnac-Royal forces consisted of at least 3,000 men-at-arms, excluding archers.

On the next day, Edward III, Duke of Bar, Robert of Bar, Count of Marle and Bernard VII, Count of Armagnac, with the rear division, made a lodgement in the suburb of Belle-Motte, so that Arras was completely surrounded.

The Burgundian garrison, under command of governer-general John II of Luxembourg-Ligny, governer Guillaume de Bonnières and captain Philippe de Beaufort, resisted the Armagnac-Royal forces with artilleries and offensive engines on the walls and frequent sallies from 2 or even 3 gates at a time, gained more than lost, and inflicted heavy casualties and captured 240 prisoners.

One particular skirmish took place near the Scarpe river, between the suburb of Belle-Motte and the postern of Arras. A party of the vanguard of the Armagnac-Royal forces, from 120 to 140 men, had crossed the river through a plank, one at a time. However, the Burgundian garrison sallied quickly to attack them and drove them back to the plank. When the besieger party found that they couldn't cross the plank safety, rallied and force the besieged forces to the postern of the city. Perceval le Grand, a man-at-arms, the leader of the townsmen, one of the men in the forces, repel the attacks, and the Armagnac-Royal forces were forced to the water's edge and got attacked so vigorously that at least 50 men killed in the spot or captured as prisoners, and another 15-20 men fell and drowned in the river, whose bodies in armour were dragged out in the following day.

About 20 men of the Burgundian garrison were killed or taken prisoner in various sallies. Including in those prisoners are Baugeois de la Beauvriere, bastard of Belle, the Bastard Dembrine and some other men from Burgundy. Although, they lost greater parts of their best horses in these skirmishes.

The castle of Belle-Motte, located near Arras, remained Burgundian during the siege, which was guarded by knights, Sir Fleurant d'Ancre and Symon de Behaignon, with a man-at-arms named Jean Rose, who was suspected of surrendering the castle to the Armagnac-Royal besieging forces for money, and he was made prisoner and his effects confiscated. The King's forces took heavy losses to conquer it.

Because of these Armagnac-Royal forces' excursions, the Burgundian garrisons stationed in Douai, Lens, Vieil-Hesdin, Maizières and other towns, made continuous incursions and ambushes against the forces, notaably carried out by Hector de Saveuse (fr), his brother, Philippe, Louis de Wargis, Lamon de Launoy and other expert men-at-arms, with usually 200-300 men, devastated heavily on the besieging forces. In retaliation for the harrassments. Pierre or Perceval (likely), the Bastard of Bourbon, an illegitimate son of Louis II, Duke of Bourbon, led 1,000 royal horsemen of the King's forces on a raid into the County of Saint-Pol, and accused the Count, who still styled himself as Constable of France although dismissed in 1413, with abusive language that he pretended to be ill to avoid serving the King and his sovereign lord, and that he had manifested his affection to the Duke of Burgundy by sending his nephew, John II of Luxembourg-Ligny to defend Arras as governer-general, with his greater vassals to assist him. As the Count of Saint-Pol had heard that, he didn't sent his men to sally the Bastard of Bourbon's forces, and so they burned a considerable part of the suburbs of the county's capital Saint-Pol. The Bastard of Bourbon's forces then returned into the King's forces at Arras.

On the next day after the Bastard of Bourbon's raid, an Armagnac-Royal force of 200 men assembled and advanced toward Lucheux, and ransacked it as far as Vieil-Hesdin and other Burgundian territories. The besieging force persuaded those lands, in which they recovered back several of their prisoners, and made many Burgundians prisoner. At different times, the Armagnac-Royal forces conduct excursions on Burgundian lands, attacking and violating poor people.

John the Fearless, Duke of Burgundy, resolved to rescue Arras, sent all of his captains, and consulted them to attack the Armagnac-Royal forces at Vaudemont, quartered by the vanguard division of John I, Duke of Bourbon, on a fixed day, with support of sallies of the Arras garrison. These captains assembled a force of 4,000 men, under John I, Seigneurs of Croÿ and Araines, Barons of Renty and Seneghem, John, Seigneur of Fosseux, John, Sire of Jumont, Jean de Charlon, Sire of Vitteaux, Sir Gautier de Ruppes. Their men marched into within 19.3 km, and sent their scouts forward (the names of the scouts were: Actis, Jacques de Breumeur (brother of Louis de Bussy), but they were found and taken prisoner by the Armagnac-Royal besieging forces. Hearing this, the Burgundian captains supposed their attack would be known, retreated back to their garrisons in the displeasure of the Duke of Burgundy.

During the time King Charles VI was besieging Arras, his men took the fortress of Avenês le Comte, belonging to John the Fearless, Duke of Burgundy, and Villers le Châtel from Enguerrand de Lières, Lord of Gournay, . These captured fortresses were considably garrisoned by the Armagnac-Royal forces, to raid the nearby countries, scout for Burgundian reinforcements, monitor the roads into Arras and intercept Burgundian communications. At this time, the besieging forces used siege engines to constantly bombard Arras, especially on the side of Vaudemont, which annoyed the population. And mines were conducted so the besieging forces could infiltrate the city.

Also on the side of Vaudemont, the Armagnac-Royal forces, under Charles of Artois, Count of Eu, mined from the side of Vaudemont into the city, in purpose to form a secret entrance for the besieging forces. However, it was found by a counter-mine on the Burgundian side led by Jean de Meschastel, Lord of Montagu, and a skirmish broke out. Each side armed with lances, and the 20-year-old Count of Eu fought valiantly against the Burgundians. Because of this, despite the Armagnac-Royal failure, he was knighted by John I, Duke of Bourbon.

After some time the underground skirmish happened, both sides retreated to their main army. The Armagnac-Royal forces of Sir Louis Bourdon were quartered during the siege of the abbey of Mount-St-Eloy. However, Bourdon's forces destroyed and stolen most of the abbey. Because of this, hitherto, the County of Artois was the most oppressed region by the Armagnac-Royal Army led by King Charles VI and Dauphin Louis.

== Siege lifted and the Treaty of Arras (1414) ==
One day after the feast day of Saint John the Baptist, Anthony, Duke of Brabant, Margaret, Duchess consort of Bavaria-Straubing and some deputies from the three estates of Flanders, negotiated King Charles VI and Dauphin Louis, to truce with John the Fearless, Duke of Burgundy. In which, this second time, it was approved, and was proclaimed in the King's tent on 8 PM, 4 September 1414. On the conclusion of the peace treaty, dysentery attacked the Armagnac-Royal besieging army, and because of this, Louis VII, Duke of Bavaria-Ingolstadt and Constable Charles I d'Albret, left the army. While Amé I, Lord of Sarrebruck-Commercy and many troops died of the diseases. This forced the King and Dauphin to sign a peace treaty, so that they can leave the infested battlefield.

With the peace treaty signed, the keys to the gates of Arras was given to the Armagnac-Royal forces, with promises that all Burgundian castles and towns in obey to the King of France. Louis, Count of Vendôme, Grand Master of France, entered the city on behalf of the King, and appointed the King-loyal and Burgundian-tied noble Jean de Tyrel, Lord of Quesnes and Viscount of Poix, to govern the city. The people and Burgundian governers of Arras sworn an oath to obey to the King.

On 12 PM, 5 September, some wicked person flamed the tents of John I, Duke of Alençon, the flamed spread so quickly that he had difficulties escaping to the King's tents. Bernard VII, Count of Armagnac, seeing the flames, sounded the trumpet, and ordered the rear division to stand to their arms, who, with Edward III, Duke of Bar, marched out after burning their quarters. Because of the spread of the fire, King Charles VI and Dauphin Louis had to escape with his forces disorganised in 15 minutes, leaving the sick people and prisoners remained burnt to death. While, John I, Duke of Bourbon retreated orderly with the vanguard division from his camps at Vaudemont. After then, the Armagnac-Royal Army marched to Senlis, where they stayed for the whole September, concluding the peace Treaty of Arras (1414) between the Armagnacs and the Burgundians. After the treaty was concluded, King Charles VI and Dauphin Louis re-entered Paris triumphiantly.
