= Guichard II Dauphin =

- Lord of Jaligny, La Ferté-Chauderon and Bommiers, Baron of Luzy
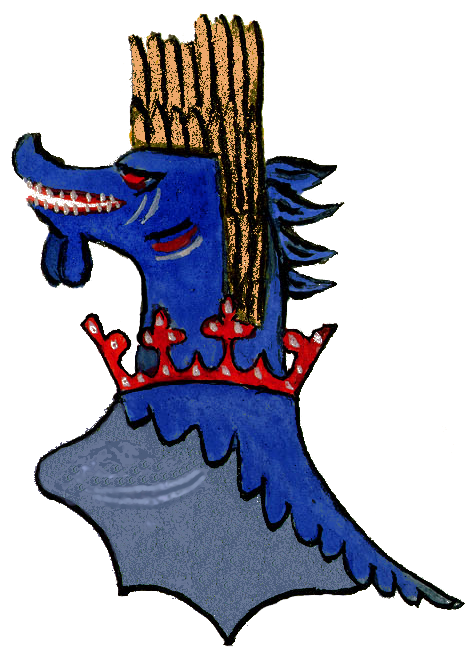
- Crest on the shield of Guichard II Dauphin

- Coat of arms: Coat of arms of Guichard II Dauphin
- Tenure: 1403 - 25 October 1415
- Predecessor: Guichard I Dauphin (fr)
- Successors: Béraud III Dauphin (known as Dauphin de Lespinasse)
- Other names: Guichart II Dauphin
- Born: Around 1365–1371
- Died: 25 October 1415; Azincourt, County of Saint-Pol, Kingdom of France (today Pas-de-Calais, France)
- Cause of death: Mortal wounds
- Wars and battles: Battle of Othée Armagnac-Burgundian Civil War: Siege of Bourges (1412) (fr); Battle of Agincourt †
- Offices: Grand Master of France (1409–1413); Chamberlain to John the Fearless, Duke of Burgundy; Captain-Governor of Montreuil (1413–1415); Governer of the Dauphiné (fr) (13 July 1415 - October 1415)
- Noble family: House of Dauphin-Jaligny
- Spouse: Eleanor de Culant
- Issue: Béraud III Dauphin
- Father: Guichard I Dauphin (fr)
- Mother: Isabeau de Sancerre

Guichard II Dauphin (around 1365–1371 - 25 October 1415 at the Battle of Agincourt) was a French military leader in service of King Charles VI of France and John the Fearless, Duke of Burgundy during the Hundred Years' War as the Grand Master of France from 1409 to 1413 and the Lord of Jaligny, La Ferté-Chauderon and Bommiers and Baron of Luzy.

== Biography ==
Guichard II Dauphin was the son of Guichard I Dauphin (fr) and Isabeau de Sancerre, his father was the Chamberlain and advisor to King Charles V of France, cupbearer of France from 1380 to 1382, Master of Crossbowmen and Lord of Jaligny, La Ferté-Chauderon and Bommiers and Baron of Luzy, in which he inherits on the death of his father in 1403. He had a brother named Louis, who ended his short life at the monastery of Marseigne, and a half-brother of Claudin, bastard of Jaligny.

On the succeed of his father's titles and estates, he paid homage to Louis II, Duke of Bourbon two days later for the lands of Jaligny, Châtelperron and Tréteau. The Duke of Bourbon intervened to let him join King Charles VI's on 2 March 1408. From then on, the King appointed him as his advisor and chamberlain, and entrusted him with managing taxes in Champagne. On 30 October 1409, King Charles VI appointed Guichard II to be the Grand Master of France. In 1410, a member of the commission tried to reform the royal administration and was caught and charged for doing so.

The King entrusted him with several diplomatic missions. On 1408, during the Armagnac–Burgundian Civil War, Guichard II Dauphin was sent to John the Fearless, Duke of Burgundy to attempt a reconciliation on behalf of the King, before joining the Duke on the Battle of Othée with Bavarian forces against the people of the Prince-Bishopric of Liège who were revolting against Prince-Bishop John of Bavaria.

In 1410, taking an advantage of a mission to King Henry IV of England that Pisan Antipope Alexander V had entrusted to Philibert de Naillac, Grand Master of the Knights Hospitaller. On 25 March, he was one of the envoys sent to the King of England, along with Jacques de Châtillon, Seigneur of Dampierre, Admiral of France, Guillaume de Tigonville (fr), former Provost of Paris, Pierre Fresnel (fr), Bishops of Noyon and Meaux and Gautier Col, Secretary to the King. It was probable that these men joined Naillac's at Westminster, and have parallel talks.

In 1411, the mentally-ill King Charles VI, under Burgundian manipulation and control, sent Guichard II Dauphin to fight the Armagnacs. In 1412, he co-commanded the vanguard of the Burgundian-Royal Army under the presence of the King and the Dauphin to besiege Bourges (fr), held by the Armagnacs under John, Duke of Berry, John I, Duke of Bourbon, dismissed Constable Charles I d'Albret, Raoul de Gaucourt and Arnaud Guillaume de Barbazan, where he led a part of the King's forces to attack the Armagnac garrison intercepting supplies for the besieging forces at Sancerre and forced their castle there to surrender, and fought the Armagnacs at the Duchy of Orléans and subdued the town of Jargeau. Because of this, the Duke of Burgundy granted him numerous gives and pensions from the royal treasury and the position of Captain-Governor of Montreuil.

During the time he fought for the Burgundians and the King, Guichard II Dauphin had fought several times against the English. Therefore, he left the Château de Bommiers and moved to the Château de Jaligny, allied with the House of Sancerre (fr). On 6 June 1413, he drew up himself an inventory of his library on the point of going to Montreuil.

In 1413, as a result of the Cabochien Revolt, the Burgundians lost control of Paris. Therefore, the control of the government and King Charles VI fell back to the Armagnacs. As a result, Guichard II lost the office of Grand Master of France to Louis, Count of Vendôme on 15 November 1413.

However, on March 1414, he was sent by the King to the Duke of Burgundy to receive the oath of peace between the Armagnac and the Burgundian factions. At the beginning of 1415, as a compensation for his loss from the office of Grand Master of France, he was granted Governor of the Dauphiné on 15 July 1415, but it's unknown when he actually exercised the office, although some sources mentioned he exercised in September 1415.

Guichard II Dauphin was present in the French Army at the Battle of Agincourt, when he was mortally wounded while leading the cavalry charge on the flanks. His most faithful companions bring his remain to his wife, and he was buried at the priory of the Holy Sepulchre of Jaligny.
