= 1413 =

1413 in various calendars
- Gregorian calendar: 1413; MCDXIII
- Ab urbe condita: 2166
- Armenian calendar: 862; ԹՎ ՊԿԲ
- Assyrian calendar: 6163
- Balinese saka calendar: 1334–1335
- Bengali calendar: 819–820
- Berber calendar: 2363
- English Regnal year: 14 Hen. 4 – 1 Hen. 5
- Buddhist calendar: 1957
- Burmese calendar: 775
- Byzantine calendar: 6921–6922
- Chinese calendar: 壬辰年 (Water Dragon); 4110 or 3903 — to — 癸巳年 (Water Snake); 4111 or 3904
- Coptic calendar: 1129–1130
- Discordian calendar: 2579
- Ethiopian calendar: 1405–1406
- Hebrew calendar: 5173–5174
- Hindu calendars
- Vikram Samvat: 1469–1470
- Shaka Samvat: 1334–1335
- Kali Yuga: 4513–4514
- Holocene calendar: 11413
- Igbo calendar: 413–414
- Iranian calendar: 791–792
- Islamic calendar: 815–816
- Japanese calendar: Ōei 20 (応永２０年)
- Javanese calendar: 1327–1328
- Julian calendar: 1413; MCDXIII
- Korean calendar: 3746
- Minguo calendar: 499 before ROC 民前499年
- Nanakshahi calendar: −55
- Thai solar calendar: 1955–1956
- Tibetan calendar: ཆུ་ཕོ་འབྲུག་ལོ་ (male Water-Dragon); 1539 or 1158 or 386 — to — ཆུ་མོ་སྦྲུལ་ལོ་ (female Water-Snake); 1540 or 1159 or 387

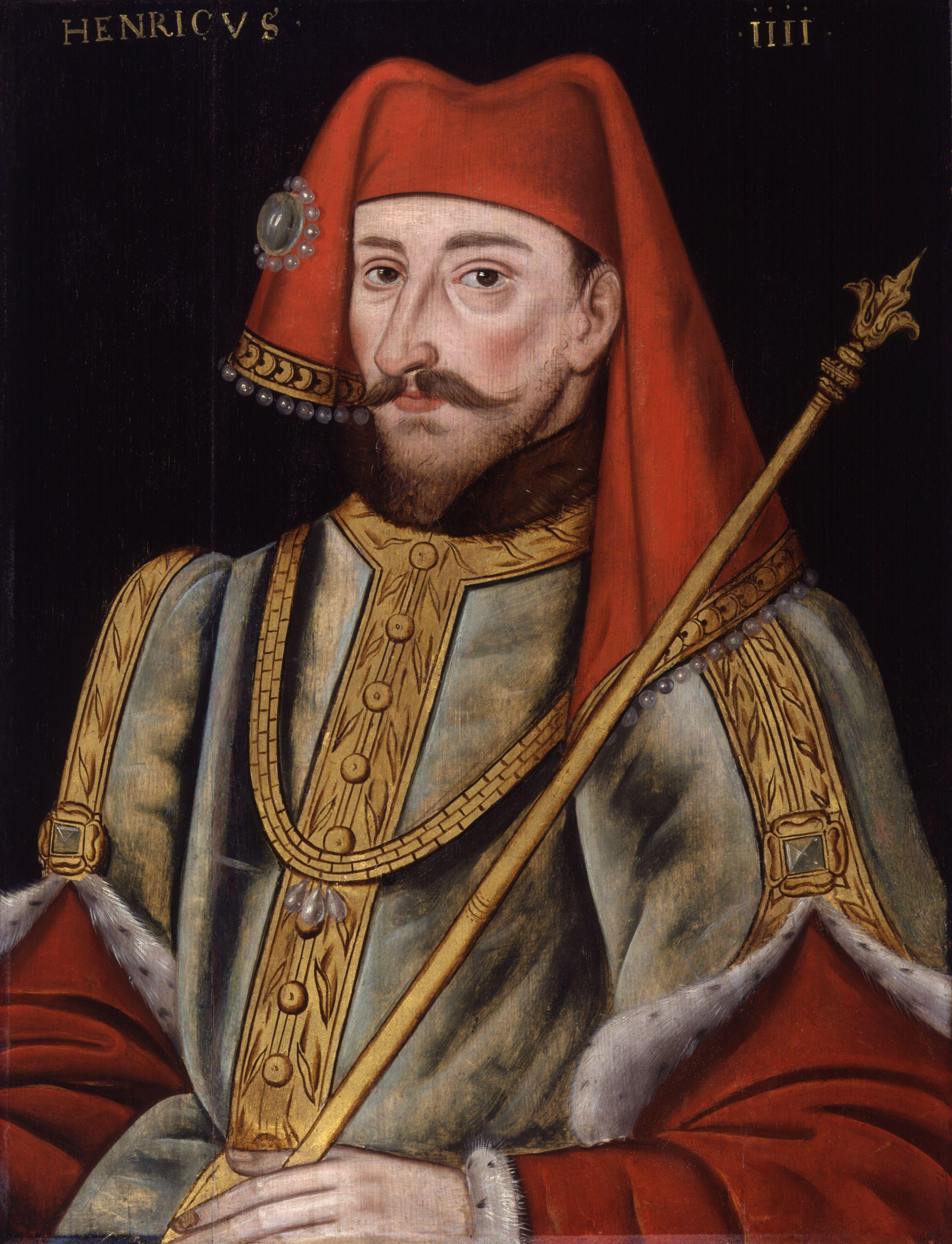
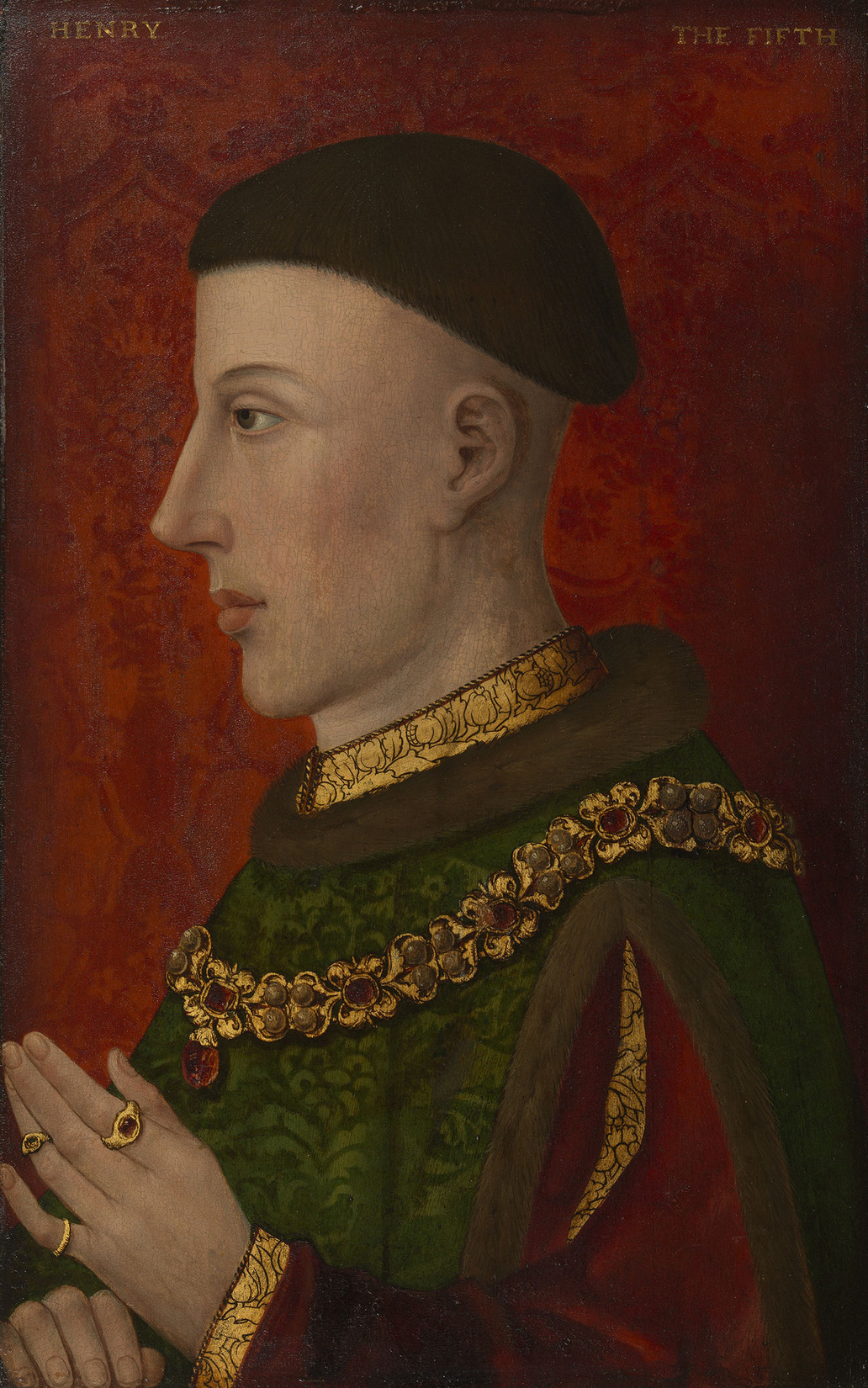
March 20: King Henry IV of England dies and is succeeded by his son, King Henry V.

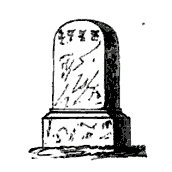
Yishiha's 1413 stele in Tyr, containing the last known inscription in Jurchen script.

Year 1413 (MCDXIII) was a common year starting on Sunday of the Julian calendar.

== Events ==
=== January–March ===
- January 30 – The First Scutari War between the Kingdom of Zeta (part of modern-day Albania and Montenegro) and the Venetian Republic comes to an end.
- February 3 – The 10th and final English Parliament of King Henry IV opens its session, but closes abruptly after six weeks because of the death of the King.
- March 20 – King Henry IV of England dies at Westminster Abbey, where the English Parliament has been meeting, in the Jerusalem Chamber of the house of the Abbot, William de Colchester.
- March 21 – Henry, Prince of Wales becomes King Henry V of England the day after the death of his father Henry IV.
- March 22 – King Henry V summons the English Parliament to meet at Westminster beginning on May 14.
- March 27 – The Republic of Genoa regains its independence after having been a territory of the Kingdom of France since 1396, and Giorgio Adorno is elected as the Doge for life. He will die after slightly less than two years in office.
- March 31 – Trùng Quang Đế, Emperor of Vietnam (at the time Đại Việt), surrenders the Kingdom to the control of China. The Chinese occupying force installs Trần Cảo as the figurehead king.

=== April–June ===
- April 9 – The coronation of Henry V as King of England takes place at Westminster Abbey.
- April 27 – The Cabochien revolt begins in Paris as a group of people, led by Simon Caboche, seize the Bastille prison and take as a hostage the Provost of Paris, Pierre des Essarts. The Cabochiens will control the city for the next four months.
- May 14 – The first Parliament of King Henry V assembles at Westminster.
- May 22 – During the confusion of the Cabochien revolt, King Charles VI of France signs into law the “Ordonnance cabochienne" that limits his power.
- May 31 – At Srinagar, Ali Shah Miri becomes the new Sultan of Kashmir in modern-day India, succeeding upon the death of his father, the Sultan Sikandar Shah Miri.
- June 8 – King Ladislaus of Naples and his troops conquer and sack the city of Rome and drive out the Antipope John XXIII.
- June 9 – Parliament closes in England as royal assent is given by King Henry V to acts passed during the session, including the Corn Measure Act 1413 and the Parliamentary Elections Act 1413 that sets regulations for the qualification of men to be elected to the House of Commons.
- June 10 – Ludwig becomes the new monarch of the German principality of Hesse upon the death of his father, Hermann II, Landgrave of Hesse.

=== July–September ===
- July 5 – Battle of Çamurlu: Mehmed I defeats his brother Musa, ending the Ottoman Interregnum.
- August 3 – The Cabochien revolt comes to an end as the citizenry and nobles of Paris rise up against rebel control. The Cabochiens who fail to flee the city are executed, although Simon Caboche and the Duke of Burgundy escape.
- August 28 – The University of St Andrews in Scotland is chartered by papal bull issued by Antipope Benedict XIII.
- September 5 – The "Ordonnance cabochienne" is repealed by the French government and King Charles's powers are restored.

=== October–December ===
- October 2 – The Kingdom of Poland and Grand Duchy of Lithuania sign the Union of Horodło.
- October 12 – Tewodros I ascends the throne as Emperor of Ethiopia following the death of his father Dawit I
- November 19 – The alliance between the Margraviate of Brandenburg and the Duchy of Pomerania-Wolgast against the Duchy of Pomerania-Stettin is renewed.
- December 1 – King Henry V of England summons the English Parliament to assemble on April 30 at Westminster.
- December 4 – By order of King Henry V of England, the remains of King Richard II (whom Henry V's father had overthrown and imprisoned in 1399) are moved from the grounds of Kings Langley Priory in Hertfordshire and reinterred at Westminster Abbey, the traditional final resting place of English monarchs.
- December 18 – The betrothal ceremony of Prince Charles of France (age 10), son of King Charles VI, to Marie of Anjou (age 9), daughter of Louis, Duke of Anjou, takes place at the Palais du Louvre in Paris. The two will marry in 1422.
- December 26 – The rule of Michele Steno as the Doge of the Republic of Venice ends after 26 years upon his death. Tommaso Mocenigo is elected to replace him as Doge.

=== Date unknown ===
- Samogitia becomes the last region in Europe to be Christianized.
- The Annals of the Joseon Dynasty begin in Korea.

== Births ==
- February 24 – Louis, Duke of Savoy (d. 1465)
- September 8 – Catherine of Bologna, Italian cloistered nun (d. 1463)
- November 19 – Frederick II, Elector of Brandenburg (d. 1471)
- date unknown – Joanot Martorell, Spanish writer (d. 1468)

== Deaths ==
- January 25 – Maud de Ufford, Countess of Oxford (b. 1345)
- March 20 – Henry IV of England (b. 1367)
- July 5 – Musa Çelebi, Ottoman prince and co-ruler of the Ottoman Empire
- September 26 – Stephen III, Duke of Bavaria (b. 1337)
- October 6 – Dawit I, Emperor of Ethiopia (b. 1382)
- December 26 – Michele Steno, Doge of Venice (b. 1331)
