= Hector, bastard of Bourbon (died 1414) =

Hector de Bourbon The Bastard of Bourbon Seigneur of Dampierre-en-Champagne
- Hector, bâtard de Bourbon
- Born: 1391
- Died: 20 May 1414 (aged 22-23); Soissons, County of Soissons, France (today Picardy, France)
- Cause of death: Wound from a crossbow bolt
- Relatives: Legitimate half-brother of John I, Duke of Bourbon
- Military career
- Allegiance: Armagnac (party)
- Service years: c. 1410 - 1414 (About 4 years)
- Rank: Captain
- Known for: An illegitimate son of Louis II, Duke of Bourbon. Challenge and fought the Burgundians valiantly at the Siege of Compiègne (1414) and fought as co-commander of the vanguard of the Armagnac-Royal Army and died at the Siege of Soissons (1414)
- Conflicts: Armagnac-Burgundian Civil War: Siege of Compiègne (1414) (fr); Siege of Soissons (1414) †

Hector, bastard of Bourbon (1391 – 20 May 1414) was an illegitimate son of Louis II, Duke of Bourbon and the Seigneur of Dampierre-en-Champagne. During the Armagnac-Burgundian Civil War, he fought for the Armagnacs and was one of the commanders of the vanguard of the Armagnac-Royal Army led by King Charles VI, Dauphin Louis, Charles I, Duke of Orléans, Bernard VII, Count of Armagnac, Constable Charles I d'Albret and many other French nobles and captains in the Siege of Compiègne (1414) (fr) and the Siege of Soissons in 1414.

== Siege of Compiègne (1414) ==
When the Armagnac-Royal Army was besieging Compiègne, held by the Burgundians. Hector distinguished himself by his bravery. On the morning of 1 May, Hector rode out of the Armagnac-Royal camp and advanced completely alone towards one of the main heavily fortified gates of the city. And he planted a "May bough" to challenge the Burgundian garrison, and they agreed to open the gates. In which, a sudden and ferocious skirmish happened in front of the city's entrance. In the skirmish, his horse was shot and killed underneath him, but he managed to held his ground until the Armagnac-Royal men reinforced to rescue him.

== Siege of Soissons (1414) ==
Hector was a captain and was appointed to co-command the vanguard of the sizeable Armagnac-Royal Army of total 8,000-10,000 men, besieging Soissons under a Burgundian garrison led by the ruthless general Enguerrand de Bournonville. On 20 May, during the bombardments of the besieging forces, Hector was parleying with Bournonvillle when he was hit by a crossbow bolt into the head. Although he was quickly treated, he wound was too severe and he died on the same day. His death enraged John I, Duke of Bourbon - his half-brother, who much loved him, whom vowed to take revenge for him, Dauphin Louis, Duke of Guyenne and many other men in the Armagnac-Royal besieging forces.

Because of the enragements, Enguerrand de Bournonville decided to flee the city. However, Simon de Craon, Lord of Clacy, one of the commanders of the Burgundian garrison, was defecting to the Armagnac-Royal forces, prevented him from doing so, which cause confusions among the garrison defending.

On 21 May, enraged because of Hector's death and the confusion of the Burgundian garrison, the Armagnac-Royal Army brutally assaulted Soissons on all direction, which took two hours, and attacked whoever they saw whether inhabitants or the Burgundian garrison. Enguerrand de Bournonville, Pierre de Ménau, the English mercenaries and troops captured in the Burgundian garrison were executed as vengeance for Hector. The crossbowman, who killed Hector, was caught by the Duke of Bourbon, and was ordered to be hanged by the testicles

After Hector's death, the title of Seigneur of Dampierre-en-Champagne was reassigned or reverted to the primary holdings of the House of Bourbon.
