= Bouton =

Bouton may refer to:

== Biology ==
- Axon terminal, also called synaptic bouton or terminal bouton

== Places ==
- Bouton, Iowa, a town in the United States
- Bouton, an older English spelling, no longer in use, for Buton, an island in Indonesia

== People ==
- Alphonse Bouton (1908-?), French rower
- Anaïs Bouton (1970-), French television presenter
- Arthur F. Bouton (1872–1952), New York state senator
- Betty Bouton (1891-?) American actress
- Bruce Bouton (born 1954), American musician
- Charles L. Bouton (1869–1922), American mathematician
- Charles Marie Bouton (1781-1853), French painter
- Christopher Bouton, American businessman
- Claude Bouton, Lord of Corbaron, courtier, poet, and diplomat
- Emily St. John Bouton (1837–1927), American educator, journalist, author, editor
- Georges Bouton (1847-1938), French toymaker and engineer
- Jim Bouton (1939–2019), American MLB player, author of Ball Four
- John Bouton (1636–1707), founding settler of Norwalk, Connecticut
- Nathaniel Bouton (1799–1878), American minister and historian
- Rosa Bouton (1860–1951), American chemist and professor

== Other ==
- De Dion-Bouton, a French automobile manufacturer
- Synaptic bouton, part of a chemical synapse
- Canine assistant of Mother Hildegarde de Gascogne in the Outlander book series

== See also ==
- Boughton (disambiguation)
