= Enguerrand de Bournonville =

Coat of arms of Enguerrand de Bournonville

Enguerrand de Bournonville (c. 1368 – 26 May 1414) was a general for Duke John I of Burgundy during the Armagnac-Burgundian Civil War. He belonged to the Bournonville family, descended from the lords of the Boulonnais and many other generals. A younger brother of Aleaume de Bournonville, he owned many minor lordships.

First entering the court of Philip II of Burgundy then that of John I as a mere squire, Enguerrand de Bournonville fought in Italy, Pisa and Genoa, in the Pays de Liège, playing a decisive part in the Battle of Othée as well as in the Île-de-France, the Berry and Picardy. He rose to become a major general, often leading more than a hundred men, including members of his family such as his cousin Lyonnel de Bournonville.

John I frequently made financial rewards to Enguerrand and – combined with his booty – this raised him a substantial fortune. He was captain of Soissons during Charles VI's siege of that city, in which the Hector, Bastard of Bourbon was killed by a crossbow bolt. After the city was captured, Enguerrand de Bournonville was betrayed by Simon de Craon and executed on the king's orders.

One chronicler called him "the flower of all the captains of France" and the Burgundian camp preserved his memory. A tomb found in the town church in Marle, Aisne in the 19th century was initially thought to have been his but actually turned out to be that of his son Antoine de Bournonville.

== Life ==
=== Descended from the lords of the Boulonnais ===
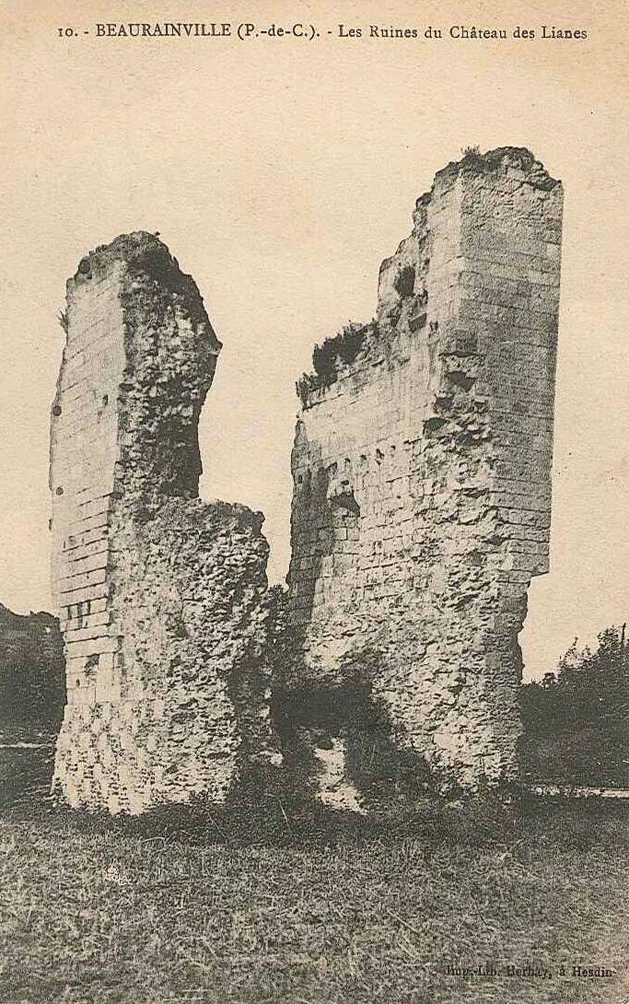
Postcard showing the remains of two walls of Lianne Castle in Beaurainville.

Enguerrand de Bournonville was from the Bournonville family, a noble lordly line living in the Boulonnais, where it held several lordships. He was the third son of Robert I de Bournonville (died c. 1369) and his wife Jeanne de Cramailles (died between 1369 and 1373), daughter of Jean, lord of Cramailles. His elder brother was Aleaume de Bournonville (1360–1415) and his first cousin was Lyonnel de Bournonville (c. 1390–1429). Through their grandmother Mahaut de Fiennes, all three of them were great-nephews of Robert de Fiennes, Constable of France.

As a younger brother, Enguerrand did not inherit the lordship of Bournonville, which instead went to his brother Aleaume. Enguerrand did receive the lordship of Lianne, for which he rendered homage in 1403. That castle was sited in what is now the town of Beaurainville overlooking the River Canche. Around 1400/1401 he married Julienne de La Motte, widow of Robert de Croutes and inheritor of the lordships of Pernes, Havenquerque and Huplandre, all located in what is now the town of Pernes. They had two children, Antoine de Bournonville, lord of Bournonville (c. 1403 – 1480) and Béatrice de Bournonville, who married Florent de Calonne. (Note: Schnerb 1997, p. 262.)

=== Squire in the service of the Dukes of Burgundy ===
Enguerrand de Bournonville entered the service of the Dukes of Burgundy around 1390–1400 at the moment when Philip II of Burgundy brought representatives into his household from all the main noble houses of Picardy. He was first mentioned in Philip's entourage in 1404 with the honorary title of a "écuyer d'écurie" (squire) before serving Philip's son John the Fearless. The title was awarded as a way of keeping nobles in his household who did not have a direct feudal link to him - Enugerrand's feudal overlord was the Count of Boulogne, who did not owe feudal allegiance to the Duke. The County of Boulogne was then a possession of John, Duke of Berry via his wife Joan II, Countess of Boulogne, but he showed little interest in it. Since the Dukes of Burgundy possessed the County of Artois (feudal overlord of the County of Boulogne), they little by little won over the loyalty of the nobles in Boulogne prior to an outright annexation in 1416 on Jean de Berry's death.

Enguerrand's career unfolded amid the struggle between the Armagnacs (supporters of the Dukes of Orléans) and the Burgundians (supporters of the Dukes of Burgundy) to control the government of France, with King Charles VI more and more prevented from governing for himself due to fits of insanity. On 2 May 1405 Enguerrand was captured fighting against the English under the command of his cousin the Count of Saint-Pol. He was kept prisoner briefly by the English before John the Fearless paid his ransom that June, putting Enguerrand under a strong obligation to him and marking the first time he and Enguerrand appeared in the same document. On 1 September 1405 Enguerrand was mentioned as an "escuier et cappitaine" in the Burgundian army raised against Louis I, Duke of Orléans, commanding 148 soldiers.

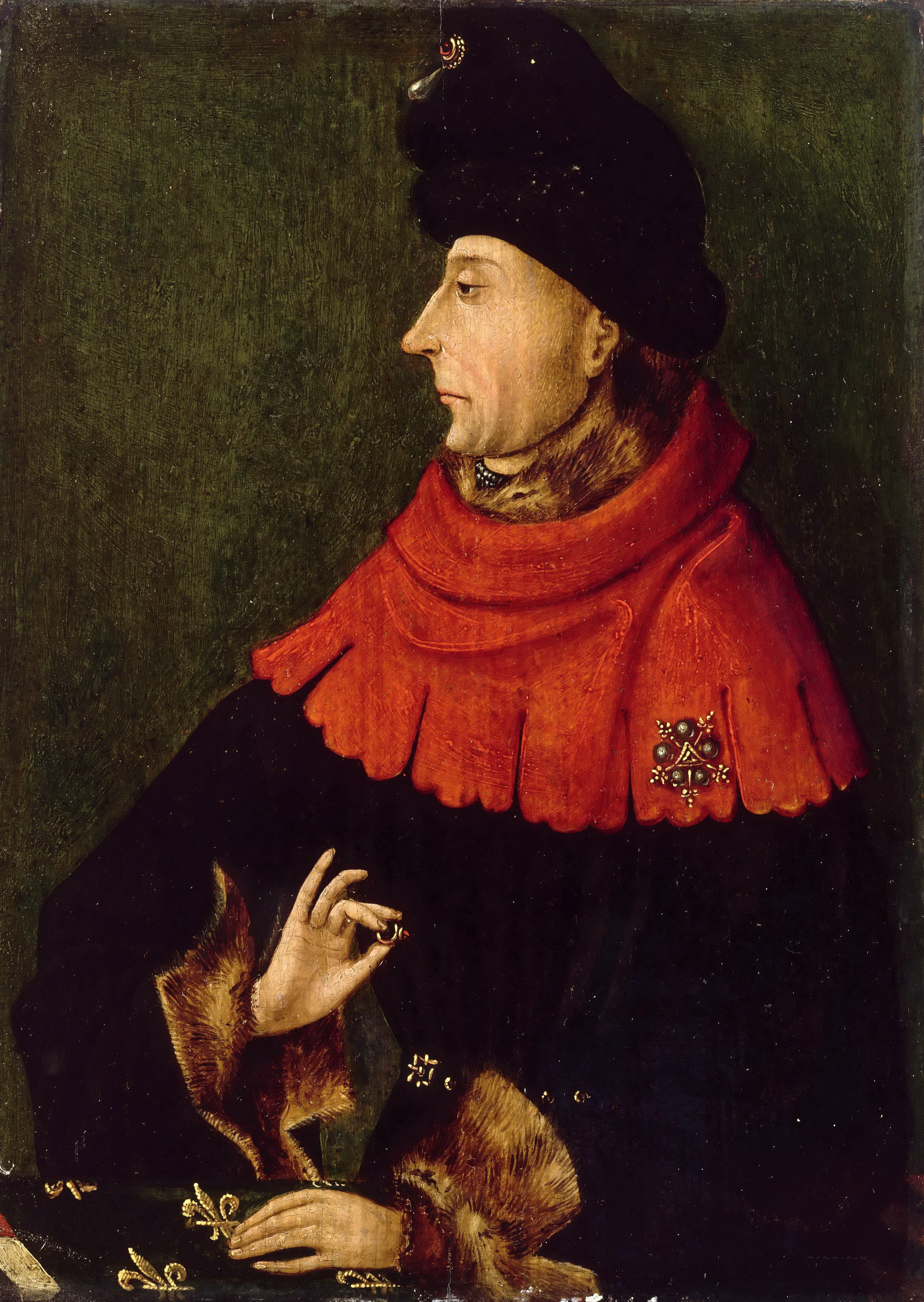
John the Fearless, oil on oak panel, musée du Louvre, early 15th century, studio of Jean Malouel.

In 1406 John and Louis, temporarily reconciled, decided to jointly rule over Pisa, then claimed by Florence. John sent Enguerrand to be his representative in Pisa, where he was enthusiastically welcomed on 7 July 1406. The city was then under siege and the Florentines captured it and Enguerrand in October. It was only in November 1407 that he was recorded as being back in John's court.

Enguerrand was directly in Philip and John's service, unlike his brother Aleaume, who did not serve the Dukes of Burgundy but was instead loyal to the Count of Saint-Pol, his second cousin, counsellor to the Dukes of Burgundy from the 1390s onwards. (Note: Schnerb 1997, pp. 248–250.)

=== Battle of Othée ===
From 1408 John the Fearless frequently made Bournonville head of his bodyguard on his many journeys - that bodyguard had become more and more necessary after the Duke of Orléans's assassination. He was also one of the Burgundian captains who took part in John's campaign in the Pays de Liège in support of its prince-bishop John III against the inhabitants of Liège, who had revolted. Bournonville commanded a company of over 150 men, including five from his own family such as his cousin Lyonnel de Bournonville. He took part in a devastating chevauchée in the area and in the Burgundian victory over the inhabitants of Liège at the Battle of Othée on 23 September 1408.

At Othée he was one of the commanders of a unit of 1400 cavalry which overwhelmed Liège's forces by a turning movement, seemingly decisive, by which Liège's forces found themselves attacked from two sides. Bournonville's rôle in the battlewas mentioned in a Burgundian song composed after the battle:

The duke was mounted on his horse

And in very good will
To do good for his people.
But when he was well advised
Of the great pride of the inhabitants of Liège
He thus took his lords,
He took Robert Le Roux and Helli
And Lord de Raisse
And Enguerran de Bournonville

To break into battle. (Note: Original text - Le duc fut à cheval montés Et en très bonne vollenté A sa gent de bien faire. Mais quant il eult bien advisé Des Lieghois la grant fiereté Adonc prist sa meffaire, Prist Robert Le Roux et Helli Et monseigneur de Raisse, Et Enguerran de Bournonville Pour rompre la bataille.)

Satisfied, John offered Bournonville major financial rewards and showed him on an Arras tapestry of the battle, as attested in a 17th-century description. Bournonville was promoted to chamberlain in 1409. Chamberlains were then the elite in John's household and only 6% of them were mere écuyers like Bournonville (compared to 92% of them being knights) In Bournonville's family the elder sons such as Aleaume, Antoine, the son of Enguerrand, Louis, the eldest son of Antoine, or their cousin Lyonnel, were knights whilst the younger sons such as Enguerrand himself or Antoine's second son Pierre were only écuyers. (Note: Schnerb 1997, pp. 241–243)

=== A Burgundian in Paris ===
In 1409 Bournonville joined a joint expedition to Italy by several different French princes. Commanding a hundred men, including a "bombardier" (artilleryman), he tried in vain to help Marshal Boucicaut during the Genoese revolt, during which Boucicaut lost control of that city. Bournonville returned to France early in 1410. While the tensions rose between the princes he stayed in Paris with John the Fearless and was officially made his counsellor. After the Peace of Bicêtre was concluded on 2 November 1410, John put his men in key positions. Bournonville remained John's man but also joined the king's court as "commissary to the guard of the château du Louvre" and became head of the bodyguard of Dauphin Louis, Duke of Guyenne.

During this stay in Paris Bournonville had an affair with a Parisian woman, Ydette de Lours, who he had probably first met at John's residence, the hôtel d'Artois. They had two children who were still young and in their mother's care in 1418. Keeping a second home in Paris in this way seems to have been quite common at this time among captains in the Burgundian army, following the example of John the Fearless himself, who had an illegitimate son born in Paris.

=== Important and prosperous general ===
In January 1409 John the Fearless made Bournonville castellan of the castle at Éperlecques, a financially rewarding role. (Note: Schnerb 1997, pp. 134–136.) 1410–1411 was a prosperous period for him. In September 1410 he recovered his estate in Lianne, having been deprived of it for many years "doubtless thanks to the influence of the widow of the duke of Orléans", and acquired others. In all he received more than 2000 livres in rewards from John. It was habitual for John to support his captains financially like this, wanting the nobility in his states to live in a way fitting to their rank.

This marked the peak of Bournonville's career. In 1411, when open conflict broke out between the Armagnacs and the Burgundians, he was in the top rank of the Burgundian generals. He, Antoine de Craon and David de Rambures were officially tasked by the king with fighting the Armagnacs. He defended Paris with Waleran III, Count of Saint-Pol, then held by the Burgundians, against the Duke of Orléans's forces. At the same time the Count of Saint-Pol put Bournonville in charge of the military education of his young nephew Jean II de Luxembourg-Ligny, (Note: Schnerb 1997, pp. 96–106) who would later be the lord of Enguerrand's son Antoine. (Note: Schnerb 1997, pp. 211–212) In 1411–1412 Bournonville fought in the outskirts of Paris, at Senlis, La Chapelle and Saint-Cloud. He then laid siege to Étampes, attacked Beauce, Poitou and Berry. He forced Dun-le-Roi to surrender and took part in the siege of Bourges in June 1412. After the Peace of Auxerre was concluded between John and the Duke of Orléans, Bournonville stayed in Paris from November 1412 to August 1413.

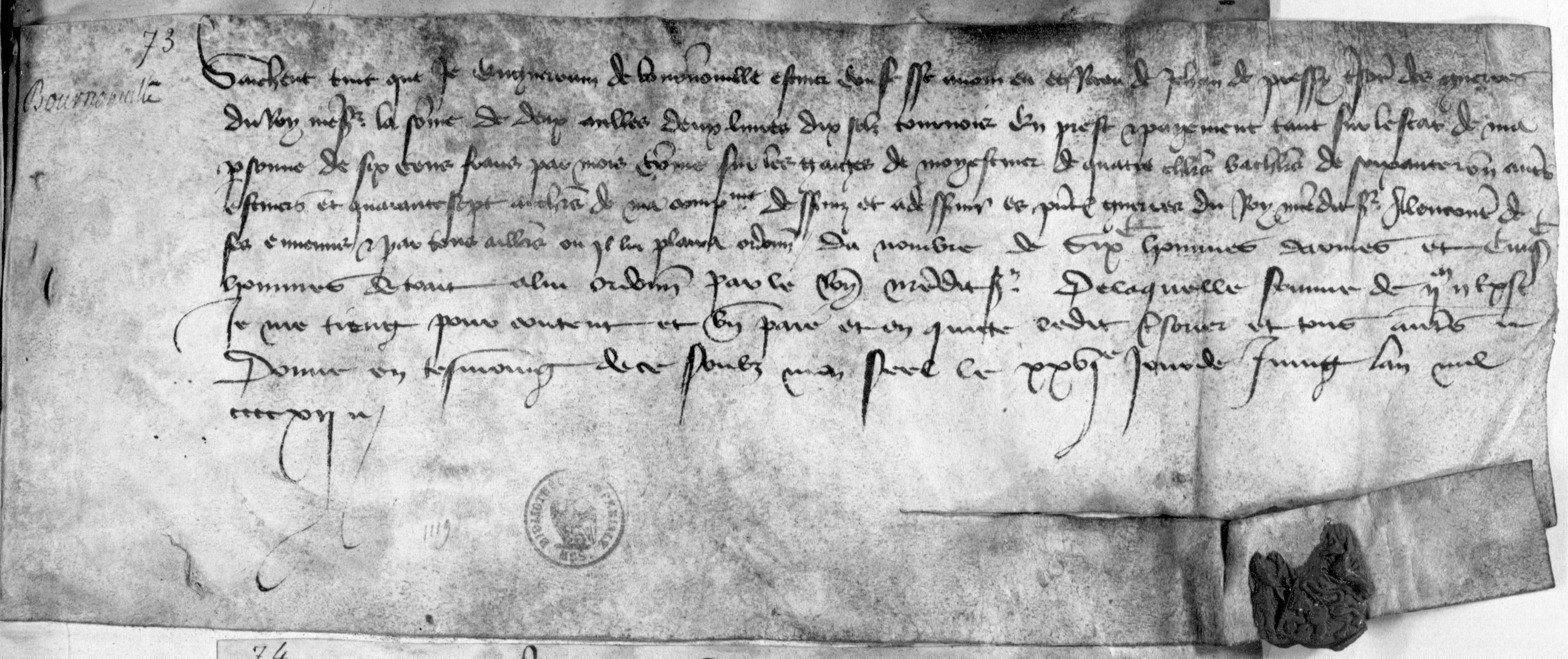
Receipt of Enguerrand de Bournonville (now in the BNF) dated 26 June 1412 for a payment of 2002 livres and 10 sous from the royal treasury for his company of 118 men in a retinue of 1100 men. The red wax seal shows Enguerrand's coat of arms.

Bournonville had gained still more from confiscations and pillaging during the war, (Note: Schnerb 1997, pp. 106–108.) with the approval of John, who in 1413 joined with Georges de La Trémoille to pillage the goods of the Provost of Paris Pierre des Essarts, who had recently been executed. John seems to have turned a blind eye to such pillaging as a convenient way of keeping his supporters loyal. John's lawyers were embarrassed by such looting, but the Burgundian knights thought it good to capture the lands and goods of John's enemies.

As a younger son of a lordly line, Bournonville was a relatively minor nobleman among the Burgundian captains, especially compared to captains of princely descent such as Jean III de Chalon-Arlay, Prince of Orange. Bournonville remained an écuyer his whole life, although 90% of John's captains were knights. Even so, he led large companies of more than a hundred men. In 1412 his company was a "retinue" of over 1,000 men in the king's service. Over the course of time the proportion of knights increased in relation to écuyers. Some of them were from Picardy, especially around the Boulonnais. Seven of his relations and six cousins - including Guillaume de Bournonville and Lyonnel de Bournonville and his illegitimate son Bertrand de Bournonville - served in Enguerrand's companies, (Note: Schnerb 1997, pp. 141–149.) along with some foreigners, including a knight from Bohemia mentioned in 1409, possibly Simon Ostlingher Structuring companies around family groups and local loyalties in this way was not unique to the Bournonville family and happened throughout the Kingdom of France, for example in the Aquitaine.

=== Siege of Soissons ===
The Burgundians had lost Paris in autumn 1413, putting control of the Kingdom of France in the Armagnacs' hands and losing John's supporters their major offices of state. In 1414 John thus decided to try to recapture it and sent three of his chamberlains (Bournonville, Antoine de Craon and Jean de Moreuil) to occupy the powerful fortress of Soissons with its enclosure flanked by twenty towers, which they managed to do on 2 February 1414. After an unsuccessful attempt to capture Paris, John fell back to Artois in mid February, making Bournonville captain of Soissons. (Note: Schnerb 1997, pp. 109–112.) He reinforced its defences, demolishing buildings too close to the ramparts, blocking the streets with chains and looting the neighbouring countryside for supplies to stop such resources falling into the hands of a besieging force. (Note: Schnerb 1997, pp. 112–116.)

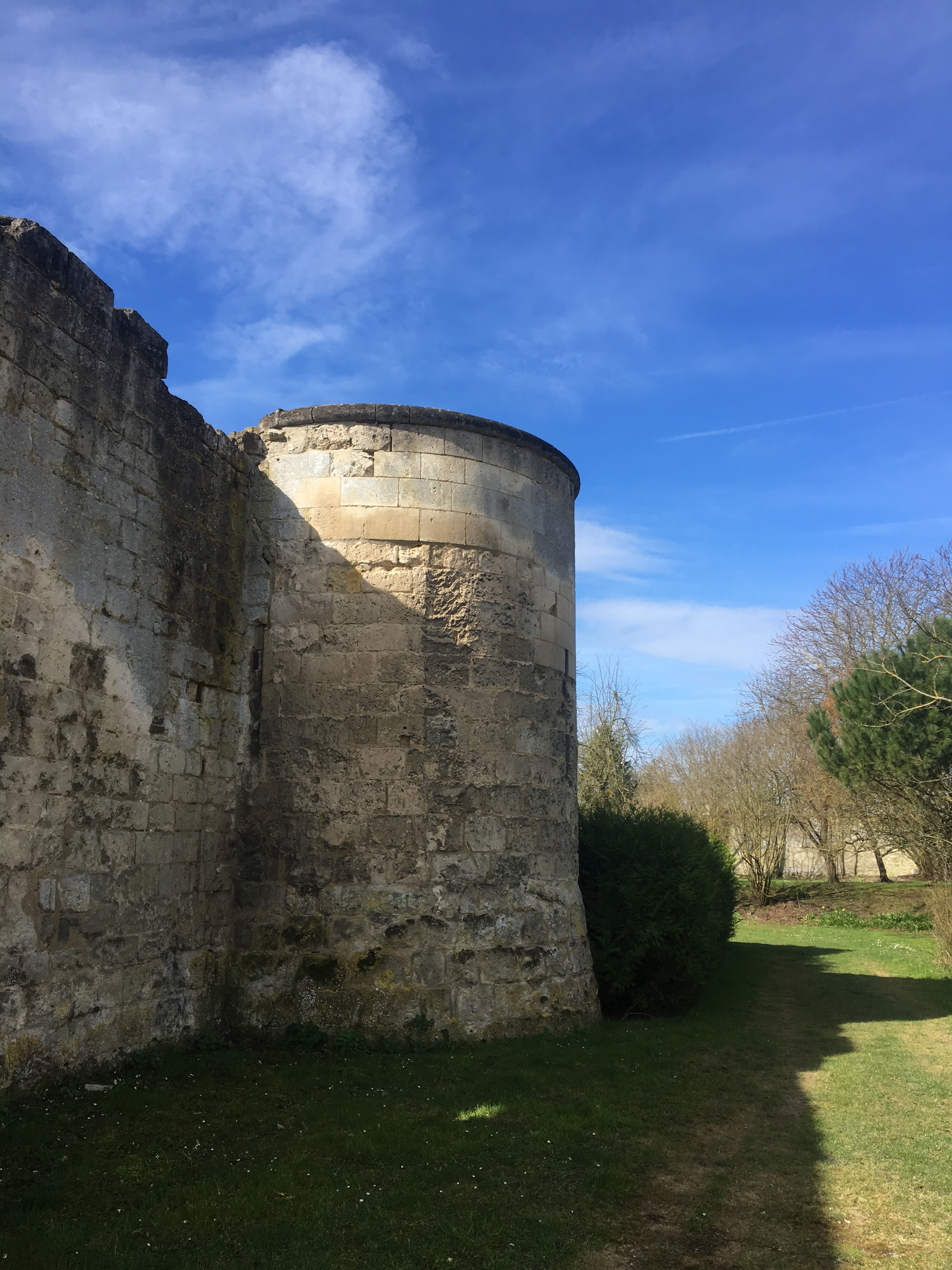
A stone bastion at the Abbey of Saint-Médard de Soissons.

On its way to take the war into Artois, the royal army arrived in Soissons at the start of May. (Note: Schnerb 1997, pp. 116–119.) Its vanguard was led by Édouard III de Bar, Clignet de Brabant (fr) and Amé I de Sarrebruck-Commercy (fr). They sent ambassadors to demand the town's surrender, but Bournonville refused and a siege ensued. On 10 May Hector, bastard of Bourbon, illegitimate son of Louis II, Duke of Bourbon and a captain in the Burgundian garrison, was wounded in the throat by a crossbow bolt (some chroniclers say he sustained it fighting a sortie from the town, while others state he received it during a reconnaissance beneath the walls or whilst in a parley with Bournonville) and died the following day. That death proved fatal to Bournonville, as it enraged John I, Duke of Bourbon and Dauphin Louis, Duke of Guyenne (as their aims to capture Hector failed), and was painfully felt throughout the royal camp - crossbows allowed even a peasant to kill an aristocrat, disrupting the social order and the laws of war, and so the Church banned them, though that ban was largely ignored thanks to their military effectiveness.

King Charles VI of France led the siege in person from 11 May onwards but Bournonville refused a second demand to surrender. The royal artillery blasted breaches in the city walls and the suburbs and the fortified Abbey of Saint-Médard, an important element in the town's defensive system, surrendered. Bournonville decided to flee the town on the night of 20–21 May, but Simon de Craon, lord of Clacy and a Burgundian captain, then in the process of changing sides, prevented this. The besiegers took advantage of the confusion in the town to attack and captured it in a two-hour assault on 21 May, ending the siege. The royal army sacked the town, killing, raping and pillaging, whilst the Armagnac captain Raymonnet de La Guerre captured Bournonville, who the king sentenced to death. (Note: Schnerb 1997, pp. 119–130.)

=== Death and aftermath ===
All the chroniclers describe Bournonville's role and the brutal treatment of the town after the assault, but they disagree on the reasons for his sentence - he was condemned as a rebel against royal authority, perhaps because John I of Bourbon had claimed his head in vengeance for his half-brother Hector. Some lords in the royal army tried in vain to plead his case and on 26 May Bournonville was beheaded in the marketplace in Soissons, with his head then fixed on a lance and his body hung from a gibbet on the plain of Saint-Crépin-en-Chaye by the armpits. Before his execution, he requested for a glass of wine, then raised and drank it to the health of the Duke of Burgundy and the death to all of his enemies. (Note: Schnerb 1997, pp. 131–134) Many of his comrades such as the knight Pierre de Menou were also beheaded or hanged. One or two of them were pardoned, such as Bournonville's man at arms Guillaume de Crannes thanks to a request from the Duke of Alençon.

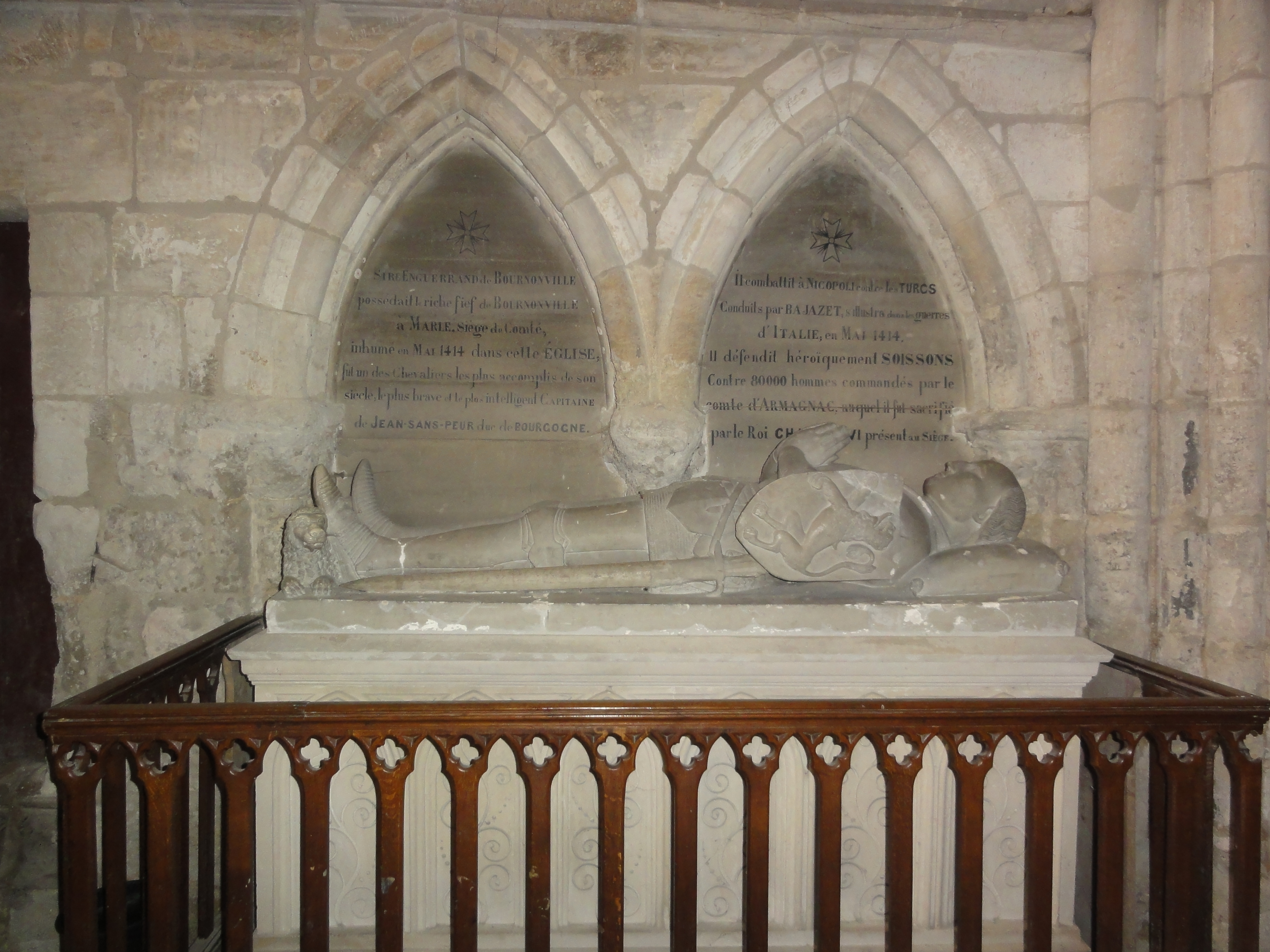
Tomb in the church at Marle wrongly identified as Bournonville's, with a text about him painted on the wall behind the arches

A note in a 17th-century genealogical manuscript shows that Enguerrand was buried in the church of Saint-Médard Abbey in Soissons, of which nothing now survives. (Note: Schnerb 1997, pp. 253–257.) Despite this, a tomb effigy now in the north aisle of the church in Marle (Note: It and the rest of the church are a monument historique.) was long mistaken for that of Enguerrand. It was originally in a side chapel in the south transept, which seems to have been called the Bournonville chapel, but was moved to its present location and almost totally remodelled around 1850. Almost nothing of the original effigy remains, though the tomb beneath it was excavated in 1867 by abbé Palant, revealing a body which he identified as Bournonville. The excavators thought that the head had been detached, but a 1634 document proves that that body was not that of Enguerrand but of his son Antoine, who died in 1480. That knowledge was lost and in the 19th century the tomb was mistaken for Enguerrand's.

Saddened by Bournonville's death, John had a mass said for his soul and immediately handed his post as castellan of Éperlecques to Enguerrand's twelve-year-old son Antoine de Bournonville, thought the actual work of that role was delegated to lieutenant. He also rewarded Bournonville's Parisian mistress Ydette de Lours. Enguerrand de Monstrelet, a pro-Burgundian chronicler from Picardy, stated that "By renown he was the flower of all the captains of France", with Burgundian courtly literature following suit and emphasising his heroism and fidelity. The Flemish chronicler Olivier de Dixmude put a speech in Bournonville's mouth on the scaffold:

Lord God, I implore your pardon for all my sins, and I thank you with all my heart for I die here for my true lord. I pray you, gentlemen, to punish the traitors who have basely handed me over, and I drink to my lord of Burgundy and to all who wish him well and to the downfall of all his enemies.

The long 1422-1425 poem Pastoralet ends with a comparison between Bournonville and the famous chanson de geste hero William of Orange, stating "He is dead, God has his soul, / He who was worthy of William of Orange.". (Note: Original text – Mort est celly, Diex en ai l'ame / Qui d'Orenge valoit Guillame) (Note: Schnerb 1997, pp. 136–138)

== Heraldry ==
The family's arms were De sable au lion d'argent, probably adopted on the marriage between Mahaut de Fiennes and Jean II de Bournonville, Enguerrand's grandfather. They were effectively a reversed version of the arms of Mahaut's brother Robert de Fiennes.

A younger son, Enguerrand bore the family coat of arms with the cadency of a crescent, fully described as De sable au lion d'argent armé et lampassé de gueules, l'épaule chargée d'un croissant d'or, with two supporters, a wild man to the right and griffin to the left. (Note: Schnerb 1997, p. 244.)

The coat of arms showing a crowned lion with a forked raised tail was not adopted by the Bournonville family until the early 17th century.

Bournonville family coat of arms (14th-17th century).

Enguerrand de Bournonville's coat of arms with cadency.

Bournonville family coat of arms from the early 17th century onwards.

== Bibliography ==
- (in French) Schnerb, Bertrand (1997). Enguerrand de Bournonville et les siens: un lignage noble du Boulonnais aux XIVe et XVe siècles. Presses Paris Sorbonne. ISBN 978-2-84050-074-2. JSTOR 40956270.
- (in French) Delaplace (abbé), « Note sur Enguerrand de Bournonville, la fleur des chevaliers », Bulletin de la société archéologique, historique et scientifique de Soissons, Librairie de Lalance et Voyeux-Solin (Soissons) et Librairie archéologique de Victor Didron (Paris), 3e, vol. XII (1903-1904), 1907, pp. 222–225.
- (in French) Amédée Piette, Enguerrand de Bournonville, Vervins, Papillon, 1855, 3 p. – on the restoration of Enguerrand's tomb in Marle church
- (in French) Amédée Piette, « Notice sur la statue du sire de Bournonville dans l'église de Marle », Bulletin de la Société académique de Laon, vol. IV, 1855, pp. 268–278.
