= John of Bar =

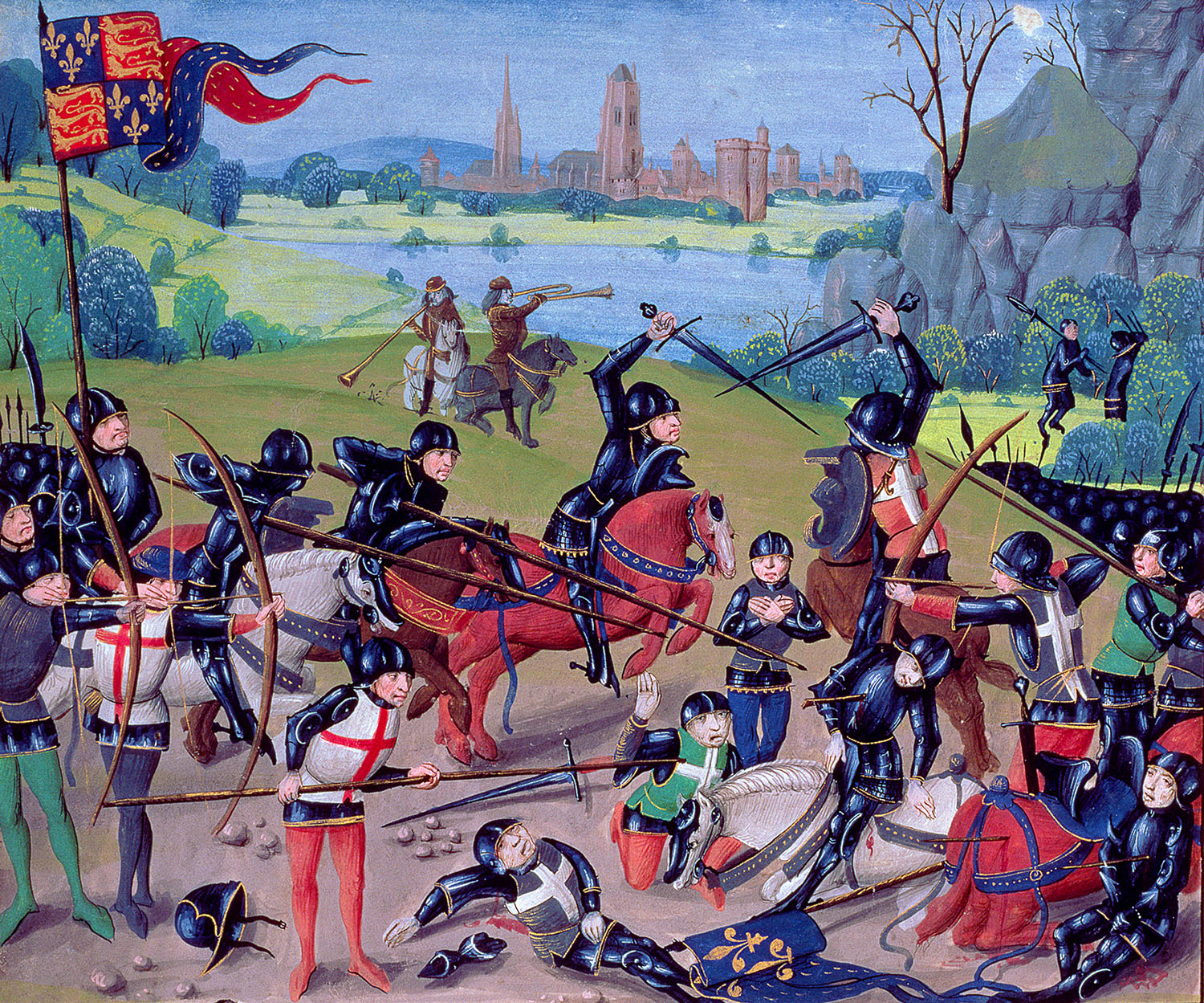
Battle of Agincourt, 15th century miniature.

John of Bar (1380 – 25 October 1415, Agincourt) was lord of Puisaye. He was the son of Robert I of Bar and Marie de France. He was killed at the battle of Agincourt alongside his brother Edward III and his nephew Robert.

== Sources ==
- (in French) Georges Poull, La Maison souveraine et ducale de Bar, 1994
- Barbara Tuchman, A Distant Mirror, 1978, Alfred A. Knopf, New York
