= Françoise-Thérèse Aumerle de Saint-Phalier Dalibard =

Françoise-Thérèse Aumerle de Saint-Phalier Dalibard (died 1757) was a French novelist and playwright. She also wrote under the pseudonyms Mlle S*** and Mlle de St. Ph***.

== Life ==
Françoise-Thérèse Aumerle de Saint-Phalier was born in Paris in the early 1720s. Her father died when she was young, and her mother raised her, encouraging her to pursue her literary interests. With a reputation as both pretty and intelligent, she married the physicist Thomas-François Dalibard.

== Works ==
- Le Porte-Deuille, or Lettres historiques. 2 vols., London, 1749.
- Les Caprices du sort, ou Histoire d'Emilie. 2 vols., Paris, 1750.
- Recueil des Poesies. Amsterdam, 1751.
- La Rivale confidente, comedie en 3 acts et en prose. Performed by the Comedie-Italienne, 1752.
- Murat et Truquia, 1752.
