= Thomas-François Dalibard =

French physicist (1709–1778)

- Born: 5 November 1709; Crannes-en-Champagne, Sarthe, France
- Died: 1778
- Known for: Florae Parisiensis Prodromus, ou catalogue des plantes qui naissent dans les environs de Paris; showing that lightning contained electricity
- Spouse: Françoise-Thérèse Aumerle de Saint-Phalier
- Scientific career
- Fields: Physicist
- Institutions: Marly-la-Ville, Val-d'Oise, France

Thomas-François Dalibard (French pronunciation: [tɔma fʁɑ̃swa dalibaʁ]; born in Crannes-en-Champagne, France in 1709, died in 1778) was a French physicist who performed the first lightning rod experiment. He was married to the novelist and playwright Françoise-Thérèse Aumerle de Saint-Phalier.

== Relationship with Benjamin Franklin ==
He first met the American scientist Benjamin Franklin in 1767 during one of Franklin's visits to France and it is said that they became friends.

In 1750, Benjamin Franklin published a proposal for an experiment to determine if lightning was electricity. He proposed extending a conductor into a cloud that appeared to have the potential to become a thunderstorm. If electricity existed in the cloud, the conductor could be used to extract it.

== Experiments with electricity ==
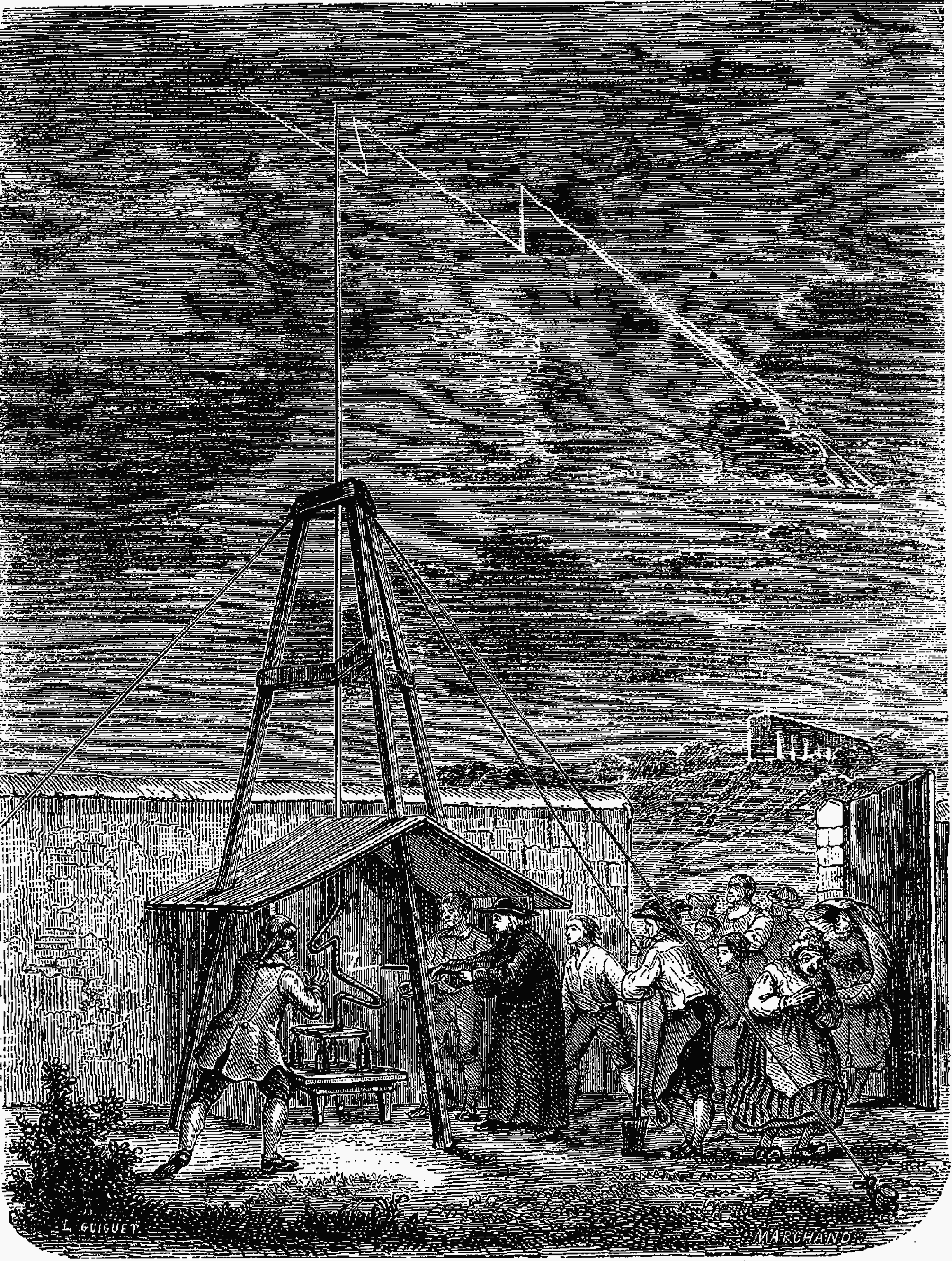
T1- d527 - Fig. 267. — Expérience Dalibard - Marly

Dalibard, who at the suggestion of Georges-Louis Leclerc, Comte de Buffon, translated Franklin's Experiments and Observations on Electricity into French, performed Franklin's proposed experiment using a 40-foot-tall metal rod at Marly-la-Ville on 10 May 1752. It is said that Dalibard used wine bottles to ground the pole, and he successfully extracted electricity from a low cloud. It is not known whether Franklin ever performed his proposed experiment.

== Publications ==
Dalibard was the author of Florae Parisiensis Prodromus, ou catalogue des plantes qui naissent dans les environs de Paris (Florae Parisiensis Prodromus, or Catalogue of Plants Native to the Area around Paris) (Paris, 1749).
