= Louis I, Duke of Bar =

French bishop

Coat of arms

Louis I of Bar (between 1370 and 1375 – 23 June 1430) was a French bishop of the 15th century and the de jure Duke of Bar from 1415 to 1430, ruling from the 1420s alongside his grand-nephew René of Anjou.

== Life ==
He was a son of Robert I of Bar and his wife Marie Valois, (daughter of John II of France). As the couple's fifth son, he was destined for a career in the church. He was Bishop of Poitiers from 1391 to 1395 (also being made a cardinal in 1391) before becoming Bishop of Langres (1397–1413), and then Bishop of Châlons-sur-Marne (1413–30). At the same time, he acted as bishop-administrator of Verdun (1419–23 and 1424–30).

He played an important role in French politics after the assassination of the Duke of Orleans in 1407. In 1409, he attended the Council of Pisa with Guy of Roye, Archbishop of Reims, and Peter of Ailly, Bishop of Cambrai. At Volti, near Gênes, a quarrel between the marshals of the town and the Archbishop of Reims degenerated into a riot, with the archbishop being killed and Louis missing-presumed dead. The cardinals, arriving at Pisa, attempted to depose Benedict XIII of Avignon and Gregory XII of Rome, and elected Pope Alexander V, hoping to put an end to the Western Schism. Instead, there would be three popes until the Pisan pope John XXIII called the Council of Constance (1414–1418). The Council arranged the abdication of both the Roman pope Gregory XII and the Pisan antipope John XXIII, excommunicated the Avignon antipope Benedict XIII, and elected Martin V as the new pope reigning from Rome.

On the death of his brother Edward III, Duke of Bar at the Battle of Agincourt in 1415, Louis inherited the dukedom and successfully defended his claim to it against that of his brother-in-law Adolphe, Duke of Juliers and of Berg, who felt that, as a clergyman, Louis was not suited to inherit the dukedom and its revenues. In 1419, in order to put an end to the differences that had existed for several centuries between the dukes of Bar and Lorraine, Louis negotiated the marriage of his grand-nephew René of Anjou to Isabella, Duchess of Lorraine (daughter and heiress of Charles II, Duke of Lorraine), and entrusted them with ruling the Duchy of Bar in the 1420s.

== Sources ==
- Vaughan, Richard (2009). Philip the Bold. The Boydell Press.
- (in French) Georges Poull, La Maison souveraine et ducale de Bar, 1994
- (in French) D. De Smyttère, "Enfants du duc de Bar Robert et de la princesse Marie," in: Mémoires de la Société des lettres, sciences et arts de Bar-le-Duc. deuxième série (in French). Vol. Tome III. Bar-le-Duc: L. Philipona. 1884. pp. 307–326.

German nobility
Preceded by Edward III	Duke of Bar; 1415–1430; With: René (1420s – 1430)	Succeeded by René I
