= Marie of France, Duchess of Bar =

French noblewoman (1344 – 1404)

Marie of Valois
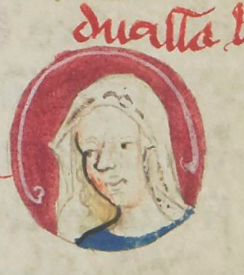
- Born: 18 September 1344; Saint-Germain-en-Laye
- Died: 15 October 1404 (aged 60)
- Spouse: Robert I, Duke of Bar
- Issue among others...: Henry of Bar; Edward III, Duke of Bar; John of Bar; Louis, Duke of Bar; Yolande, Queen of Aragon
- House: Valois
- Father: John II of France
- Mother: Bonne of Bohemia

Marie of France (18 September 1344 – 15 October 1404) was the sixth child and second daughter of John II of France and Bonne of Bohemia.

== Marriage and issue ==
In 1364, Marie married Robert I, Duke of Bar. Marie had an extensive library and obtained works about a variety of topics. She read romances and poetry, but also works about history and theology. Jean d'Arras dedicated his Roman de Mélusine to Marie.

Marie and Robert had:

- Charles of Bar (d. 1392)
- Henry of Bar (d. October 1397) in Treviso, Italy, of the plague; married Marie de Coucy, Countess of Soissons
- Philip of Bar (d. 25 September 1396), killed at the Battle of Nicopolis
- Edward III, Duke of Bar (d. 25 October 1415), killed at the Battle of Agincourt
- John of Bar (d. 25 October 1415), killed at the Battle of Agincourt
- Louis, Duke of Bar (d. 1431). Bishop of Verdun and bishop of Chalon, later a Cardinal.
- Marie of Bar, married William II, Marquis of Namur in 1384
- Yolande of Bar (c. 1365 - 1431), married John I of Aragon in 1384
- Bonne of Bar, married Waleran III of Luxembourg, Count of Ligny in 1393
- Joanna of Bar (d. 15 January 1402, married Theodore II, Marquis of Montferrat in 1393
- Yolande the Younger of Bar, named after older sister for uncertain reasons, married Adolf, Duke of Jülich-Berg

== Sources ==
- d'Arras, Jean (2012). Melusine; or, The Noble History of Lusignan. Translated by Maddox, Donald. The Pennsylvania State University Press. ISBN 9780271059907.
- Péporté, Pit (2011). Constructing the Middle Ages: Historiography, Collective Memory and Nation-Building in Luxembourg. Brill. ISBN 9789004210660.
- Rohr, Zita Eva (2016). Yolande of Aragon (1381-1442) Family and Power: The Reverse of the Tapestry. Palgrave Macmillan. ISBN 9781137499134.
