= Nathaniel Bouton =

American minister and historian

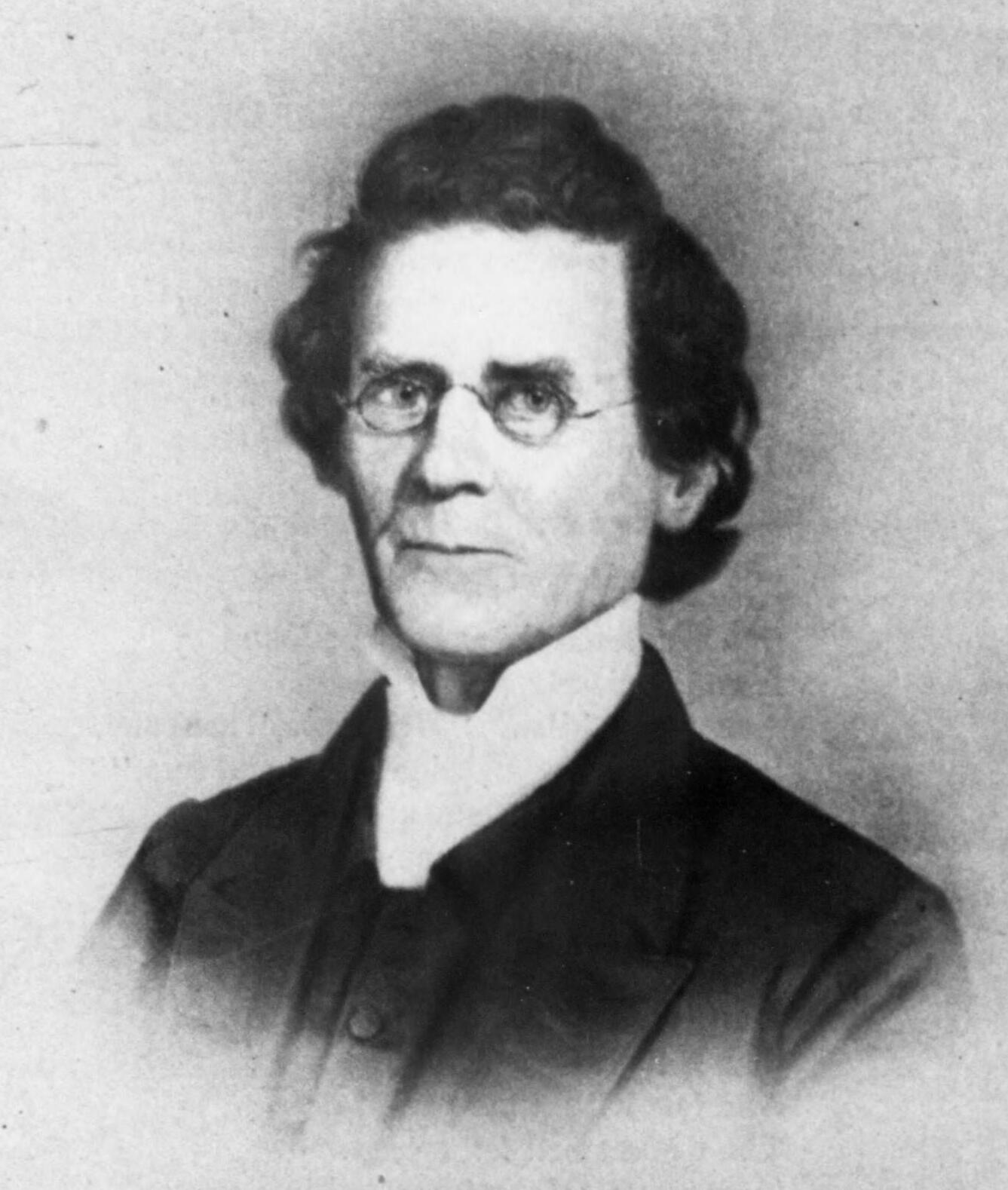
- Nathaniel Bouton circa 1902
- Born: June 20, 1799; Norwalk, Connecticut, US
- Died: June 6, 1878 (aged 78); Concord, New Hampshire, US
- Education: Yale College (1821), Andover Theological Seminary (1824)

Ecclesiastical career
- Religion: Congregationalist

Nathaniel Bouton (June 20, 1799 – June 6, 1878) was an American Congregationalist minister and historian from New England. He pastored the "Old North" church in New Hampshire for 42 years from 1825 to 1867 and was a trustee of Dartmouth College from 1840 to 1877. He was passionate about abolitionism, temperance, education, and history; and authored a number of writings on the history of New Hampshire as part of the New Hampshire Historical Society and as State Historian.

== Biography ==
Bouton, the youngest of fourteen children of William and Sarah Bouton, was born in Norwalk, Connecticut, June 20, 1799. His father was a farmer who had served during the American Revolutionary War. At the age of 14 he was bound out as an apprentice in a printing office in Bridgeport, Connecticut. Bouton hoped it would give him the opportunity to read, as his family owned few books. He remained there for a few years, but his religious upbringing and attendance at a number of religious revivals caused him to feel, as he later said, "the good Providence and Spirit of God, [which] soon gave a new impulse and direction to my mind" and at the age of 16, he gave himself to the service of God. He then purchased the balance of his time in order to obtain an education for the ministry.

With the help of his family and ministers from the area, he was able to get private tutoring and an education at local academies, which then allowed him to attend Yale College, where he spent his vacations spreading the gospel to young people in the area as a way to repay the ministers who had helped him with his education. While at Yale he served as president of the Society of Brothers in Unity, and was a member of the Phi Beta Kappa Society. He graduated from Yale in 1820. He then attended the Andover Theological Seminary, from which he graduated in 1824.

On March 23, 1825, he was named pastor of the First Congregational Church in Concord, New Hampshire, where he remained until his resignation on March 23, 1867. The church, also known as Old North, was the "rallying point of the town, and the great congregation, averaging about a thousand, thronged it every Sabbath. They came from all directions, long distances, and many on foot" according to historian John N. McClintock. In addition to preaching there on Sundays, Bouton held open Monday evening meetings, instituted four Bible classes, traveled on horseback to different districts to give weekly lectures in schoolhouses, pray with the sick and elderly, and visit each family in his parish at least once a year. Sunday school attendance increased under him to 925 students by 1832, and Bouton was notable for allowing and even encouraging women to speak and ask and answer questions in church. Bouton also served as Chaplain of the New Hampshire State Legislature in 1826, and Chaplain of the New Hampshire State Asylum for the Insane from 1867 to 1870.

In 1834, Bouton helped found the New Hampshire branch of the American Anti-Slavery Society along with Reverend George Storrs. Based in Concord, it was one of the first abolitionist societies in the area, the first being formed two years earlier in Plymouth. In 1845, Bouton's Old North church hosted a famous debate between Franklin Pierce and John P. Hale on slavery and abolitionism. Bouton was outspoken with his views on issues such as his support of the abolition and temperance movements; however, he prided himself on never airing his personal or political views as part of his sermons.

Bouton was involved in various other societies and served in positions such as trustee and president of both the New Hampshire Missionary Society and the Ministers' and Widows' Charitable Fund; co-founder and vice president of the American Home Missionary Society; director of both the New Hampshire Bible Society and the New Hampshire Educational Society; and member of the American Board of Commissioners for Foreign Missions, New England Historical and Genealogical Society, and Historical Societies in New Hampshire, Maine, Wisconsin, Pennsylvania, and New Jersey. He also was a trustee of Dartmouth College from 1840 to 1877, which conferred on him the honorary degree of Doctor of Divinity in 1851.

Bouton was also interested in historical studies, and in his spare time authored History of Concord, published in 1856. At different times he also served as Librarian, President, and Corresponding Secretary of the New Hampshire Historical Society, which he became a member of in 1831, and edited two volumes of its Collections. Feeling the need for a change, Bouton resigned his pastorate in 1867 after 42 years in the ministry, and was appointed as State Historian and Editor and Compiler of the Provincial Records of New Hampshire, and in that capacity issued ten volumes of Provincial Papers, from 1867 to 1877. He also published over 30 sermons and addresses, and a few other volumes.

Bouton's children urged him to write an autobiography, which he did in 1877. He died in Concord on June 6, 1878, at the age of 79. He was buried at Blossom Hill Cemetery in Concord.

== Family ==
Bouton married Harriet Sherman on September 11, 1825, daughter of Rev. John Sherman and the great-granddaughter of founding father Roger Sherman, but she died in Concord, May 21, 1828, at the age of 21. He married his second wife, Mary Ann Bell, daughter of John Bell, of Chester, New Hampshire, on June 8, 1829, but she died ten years later in Concord, February 15, 1839, at the age of 34. On February 18, 1840 he married his third wife, Elizabeth Ann Cilley, daughter of Horatio G. Cilley, of Deerfield, New Hampshire. He had thirteen children in total, two children by the first marriage, five by the second, and six by the third.
