= Simon Caboche =

French rebel

Simon Lecoustellier, called Caboche, a skinner of the Paris Boucherie, played an important part in the Cabochien Revolt of 1413. He had relations with John the Fearless, Duke of Burgundy, since 1411, and was prominent in the seditious disturbances which broke out in April and May, following on the Etats of February 1413. In April, he stirred the people to the point of revolt and was among the first to enter the hotel of the Dauphin of France. When the butchers had made themselves masters of Paris, Caboche became bailiff (huissier d'armes) and warden of the Charenton-le-Pont. Upon the publication of the great ordinance of May 26, he used all his efforts to prevent conciliation between the Burgundians and the Armagnacs. After the fall of the Cabochien party on 4 August, he fled to the Duchy of Burgundy in order to escape from royal justice. Doubtless he returned to Paris in 1418 with the Burgundians and joined their coup d'état and massacre of the city.

== Bibliography ==
- Colville, Alfred (1888). Les Cabochiens et l'ordonnance de 1413. Paris: Hachette.
