= Bommiers =

- Commune
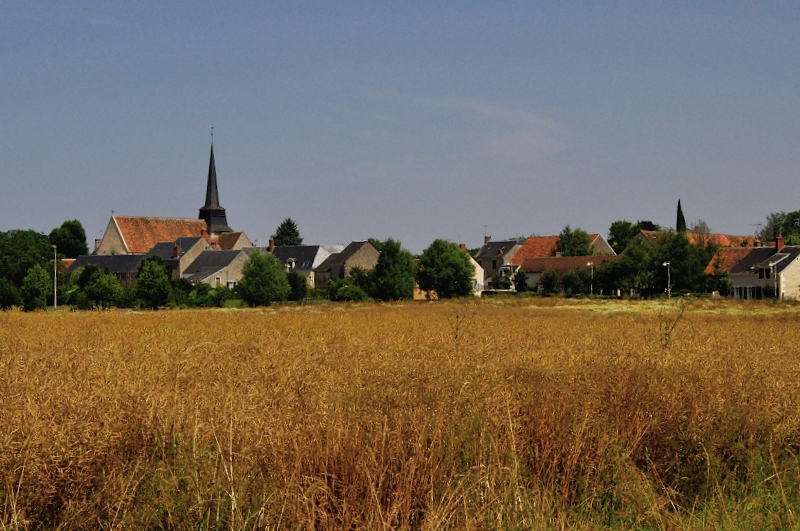
- A general view of Bommiers

- Coat of arms
- Location of Bommiers
- Location within France Location within Centre-Val de Loire
- Coordinates: 46°47′44″N 1°59′10″E
- Country: France
- Region: Centre-Val de Loire
- Department: Indre
- Arrondissement: Issoudun
- Canton: La Châtre

Government
  - Mayor (2020–2026): Bernard Allouis
- Area^{1}: 28.38 km^{2} (10.96 sq mi)
- Elevation: 161 m (528 ft)
- Highest elevation: 204 m (669 ft)
- Lowest elevation: 143 m (469 ft)
- Population (2023): 321
  - Density: 11.3/km^{2} (29.3/sq mi)
- Time zone: UTC+01:00 (CET)
  - Summer (DST): UTC+02:00 (CEST)
- INSEE/Postal code: 36019 /36120
- ^{1} French Land Register data, which excludes lakes, ponds, glaciers > 1 km^{2} (0.386 sq mi or 247 acres) and river estuaries.

Bommiers (French pronunciation: [bɔmje]) is a commune in the Indre département in central France.

== Population ==
Historical population
Year	Pop.	±% p.a.
1968	363	—
1975	350	−0.52%
1982	283	−2.99%
1990	229	−2.61%
1999	260	+1.42%
2007	283	+1.07%
2012	293	+0.70%
2017	305	+0.81%
2023	321	+0.86%
Source: INSEE

== See also ==
- Communes of the Indre department
