= Rosa Bouton =

American chemist

Rosa Bouton (c. December 19, 1860 – February 15, 1951) was an American chemist and professor who organized and directed the School of Domestic Science (now the Department of Nutrition and Health Sciences) at the University of Nebraska in 1898. Despite the lack of funding, Bouton worked to provide a course to teach young women about home economics. As years passed and the demand for more courses and areas of study emerged, Bouton, as the sole instructor, continued to strengthen and build the department to provide such an education to these women.

== Early life ==
Rosa Bouton was born on December 19, 1860, in Albany, Kansas. She was one of five children. Her mother was Fanny (Waldo) Bouton and her father was Eli F. Bouton. At the age of seven, Rosa's mother died. Her father was a school teacher and worked in education for many years. After the death of his wife in 1867, Eli soon remarried.

== Education ==
Bouton began her studies at the State Normal School in Peru, Nebraska. After two years, in 1881, she received her teaching certificate. Her work was recognized by a teacher at the State Normal School, Henry Nicholson. Following his work at the State School, Nicholson moved to the University of Nebraska. Nicholson invited Bouton to go to Nebraska with him. In 1888 she enrolled in graduate school at the University of Nebraska and studied chemistry. She also served as an instructor in the chemistry department. In 1891, she graduated with a Bachelor of Science degree and two years later received a Master of Liberal Arts Degree.

== Career ==
=== 1893–1912: Early career ===
Following her graduation, Bouton remained active within the scientific community. She continued to work for the chemistry department at the University of Nebraska (NU), joined the American Chemical Society in 1893 and performed research that she published in 1898. She was the second female member of the American Chemical Society. While a graduate student at NU, she taught classes in chemistry, including courses related to analytical chemistry and applied domestic chemistry. The domestic science courses covered subjects such as food analysis, sanitation, and contaminants in food. Additionally, Bouton conducted research with fellow faculty member Samuel Avery at NU, and her work with phenylglutaric acids was published in 1898 in the Journal of the American Chemical Society. Her focus of study was on the effect that phenyl groups have on the properties of acids.

In 1898, NU established a School of Domestic Science, which requested that Bouton organize it. In 1894, Bouton had met with Ellen Swallow, a leader in organizing college-level courses related to home economics. Bouton began her work in developing this program. She was given an initial $15 from the school to acquire appliances including tables, sinks, stoves, cupboards, and other supplies. While this was not enough to equip the classroom properly, she also received funding from the chemistry department with Nicholson's help. Bouton often spent her own money on supplies and training. In the summer of 1898, she went to Boston. to learn more about domestic science.

When the school opened, there were 11 students enrolled. Within two years, the enrollment had increased to 41, and Bouton was named the director. In 1906, the School of Domestic Science grew from a two-year to a four-year program and was later renamed the College of Home Economics. The school continued to expand, and Bouton designed a new school that was built in 1908. In 1912, enrollment for the school reached over 300 students. The school had also hired more trained instructors who took over for Bouton in 1912 when she was asked to step down from her position. At the age of 51, she resigned from NU and moved out of Nebraska.

=== 1916–1951: Later career ===
From 1912 to 1916, Bouton lived in San Diego, California, where she ran a small speciality bakery. After the bakery's failure, she reentered the education industry and began teaching home economics courses at a high school in a small town in Arizona for about a year. She accepted a position to become a home demonstration agent for the Arizona Agricultural Extension Services where she served in communities helping women and working as a nurse and counselor. At the age of 74, she retired and moved back to California to live with her sister. After fighting a long illness, Bouton died in Pomona, California, on February 15, 1951.

== Legacy ==
A women's dormitory at NU was named in honor of Bouton's contributions.
