= Chantenay-Saint-Imbert =

- Commune
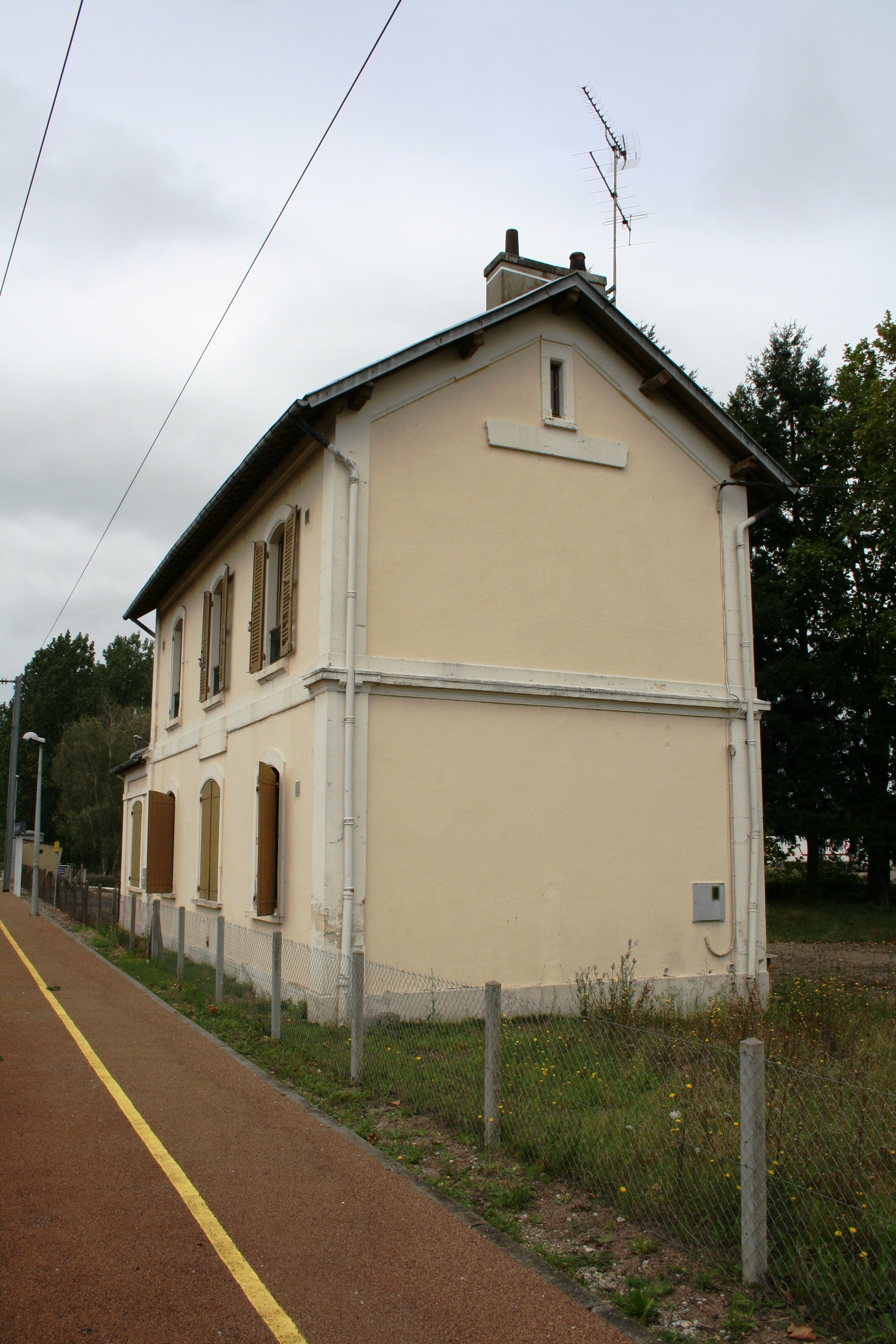
- Chantenay-Saint-Imbert railway station
- Location of Chantenay-Saint-Imbert
- Location within France Location within Bourgogne-Franche-Comté
- Coordinates: 46°44′01″N 3°11′05″E
- Country: France
- Region: Bourgogne-Franche-Comté
- Department: Nièvre
- Arrondissement: Nevers
- Canton: Saint-Pierre-le-Moûtier
- Intercommunality: Nivernais Bourbonnais

Government
  - Mayor (2020–2026): Joël Dubois
- Area^{1}: 41.69 km^{2} (16.10 sq mi)
- Highest elevation: 262 m (860 ft)
- Lowest elevation: 182 m (597 ft)
- Population (2023): 1,073
  - Density: 25.74/km^{2} (66.66/sq mi)
- Time zone: UTC+01:00 (CET)
  - Summer (DST): UTC+02:00 (CEST)
- INSEE/Postal code: 58057 /58240
- ^{1} French Land Register data, which excludes lakes, ponds, glaciers > 1 km^{2} (0.386 sq mi or 247 acres) and river estuaries.

Chantenay-Saint-Imbert (French pronunciation: [ʃɑ̃tnɛ sɛ̃t‿ɛ̃bɛʁ]) is a commune in the Nièvre department in central France.

== Demographics ==
As of 2019, the population was 1,152.

== See also ==
- Communes of the Nièvre department
