= Crannes-en-Champagne =

- Commune
- Location of Crannes-en-Champagne
- Location within France Location within Pays de la Loire
- Coordinates: 47°58′52″N 0°03′08″W
- Country: France
- Region: Pays de la Loire
- Department: Sarthe
- Arrondissement: La Flèche
- Canton: Loué
- Intercommunality: Loué - Brûlon - Noyen

Government
  - Mayor (2020–2026): Francis Cosnet
- Area^{1}: 11.97 km^{2} (4.62 sq mi)
- Highest elevation: 117 m (384 ft)
- Lowest elevation: 52 m (171 ft)
- Population (2023): 340
  - Density: 28/km^{2} (74/sq mi)
- Time zone: UTC+01:00 (CET)
  - Summer (DST): UTC+02:00 (CEST)
- INSEE/Postal code: 72107 /72540
- ^{1} French Land Register data, which excludes lakes, ponds, glaciers > 1 km^{2} (0.386 sq mi or 247 acres) and river estuaries.

Crannes-en-Champagne (French pronunciation: [kʁan ɑ̃ ʃɑ̃paɲ]) is a commune in the Sarthe department in the Pays de la Loire region in north-western France.

== Notable person ==
- Thomas-François Dalibard (1709–1778), born in Crannes-en-Champagne

== See also ==
- Communes of the Sarthe department
