= Jacques de Châtillon de Dampierre =

Jacques de Châtillon seigneur de Dampierre
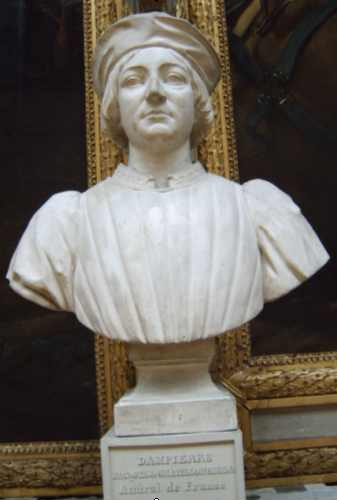
- Born: c. 1367
- Died: 25 October 1415; Azincourt, France
- Office: Admiral of France
- Spouse: Jeanne de La Rivière
- Children: Jeanne de Castillan; Waleran de Châtillon, seigneur de Dampierre; Jacqueline de Chastillon
- Parents: Hughes de Châtillon, Seigneur de Dampierre (father); Agnès de Séchelles, Dame de Séchelles (mother)
- Family: Châtillon

Jacques de Châtillon, lord of Dampierre (c. 1367 – 25 October 1415) was a French nobleman who served as Admiral of France from 1405 to 1415 under King Charles VI, until his death at the Battle of Agincourt.

== Sources ==
- Devries, Kelly (1999). Joan of Arc: A Military Leader. The History Press.
