= Louis, Duke of Guyenne =

Louis of Guyenne
- Dauphin of Viennois, Duke of Guyenne
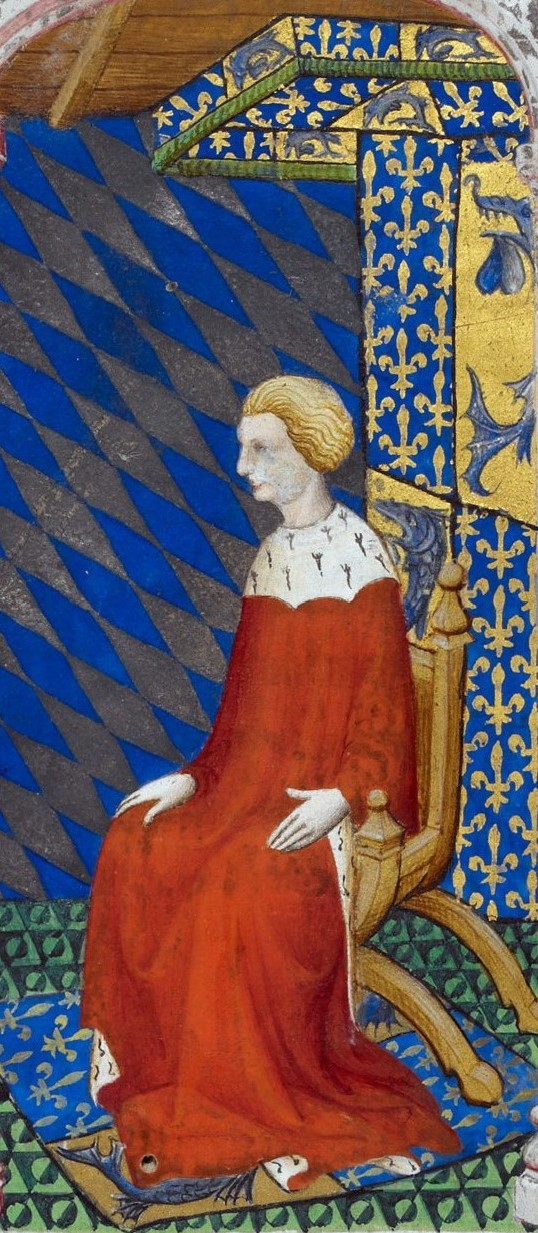

Dauphin of Viennois
- Reign: 13 January 1401 – 18 December 1415
- Predecessor: Charles
- Successor: John of Touraine
- Born: 22 January 1397; Hotel Saint-Pol, Paris, Kingdom of France
- Died: 18 December 1415 (aged 18); Paris, Kingdom of France
- Burial: Cathedral of Notre-Dame of Paris
- Spouse: Margaret of Nevers
- House: Valois
- Father: Charles VI of France
- Mother: Isabeau of Bavaria

Louis (22 January 1397 – 18 December 1415) was the eighth of twelve children of King Charles VI of France and Isabeau of Bavaria. He was their third son and the second to hold the titles Dauphin of Viennois and Duke of Guyenne, inheriting them in 1401, at the death of his older brother, Charles (1392–1401).

Louis was born between the eighth and ninth hours of the evening in the royal Hôtel Saint-Pol in Paris. He was baptised the next day in the parish church of Saint-Paul, with eight prelates attending, including the abbot of Saint-Denis. Present also was a large assembly of noblemen and ladies. The infant was carried to the font by Duke Louis I of Orléans, Pierre le Bègue de Villaines, and Countess Joan of Ligny. They gave him the name Louis and the archbishop of Vienne performed the baptism.

== In his mother's household ==
The first years of Louis's life were spent in the care of his mother. Only after the death of his elder brother Charles on 13 January 1401 did he take on a political importance by inheriting the Dauphiné. On 14 January, King Charles formally invested Louis with the Duchy of Guyenne, which was also raised into a peerage (pairie). On 28 February 1402, Charles juridically emancipated his son and Louis performed homage for Guyenne. Nonetheless, the young dauphin did not have his own household or treasury, but the monies collected by the treasurer-general of the Dauphiné were deposited with his mother. The revenues of Guyenne were overseen by John, Duke of Berry, as lieutenant-general of Languedoc.

On 26 April 1403, Charles decreed that if Louis inherited the throne while still a minor, he would not be under the traditional regency, but the queen mother and the dukes of Orléans, Bourbon, Burgundy, and Berry would guide him. On 28 April, the king agreed to the marriage of Louis and Margaret, who was the daughter of John, Count of Nevers, the granddaughter of the Duke of Burgundy, and who had previously been betrothed to Louis' brother Charles in 1395. On 4 July, another royal ordinance confirmed the revenues of Guyenne to the Duke of Berry for the rest of his life, to revert to Louis on the duke's death. On 30 January 1404, the king ordered the establishment of a household (hôtel) and treasury separate from Queen Isabeau's for the seven-year-old Louis.

== Having his own household ==
Although Louis's marriage contract had been signed before a great council of the realm on 5 May 1403, the duke of Orléans, who had hoped his daughter would marry the dauphin, absented himself. The marriage of Louis's sister Michelle to Margaret's brother Philip, Count of Charolais, was also finalised at this council. Since Louis and Margaret were related to within the prohibited degree, a papal dispensation had to be obtained. As a consequence, the couple was not married until 30 August 1404 in the cathedral of Notre-Dame de Paris.

As King Charles VI descended into madness, influence over and control of Louis became of increasing importance to the parties that sought to control royal policy. In 1404, Louis' father-in-law succeeded as Duke of Burgundy. In 1405, the Duke of Orléans, in cooperation with the queen, perpetrated the "first kidnapping of the Dauphin" in order to separate Louis from the influence of his father-in-law. As the Duke of Burgundy approached Paris on a royal summons, the duke of Orléans and the queen left the city and sent for Louis to accompany them. The dauphin was ill, but was brought by boat and then by litter to Juvisy, where he was intercepted by the lord of Saint-Georges, a vassal of his father-in-law. The Duke of Burgundy and the Count of Charolais then met him and escorted him back to Paris in his litter. There the young duke was put up in the Louvre Castle, because it was easier to defend than the Hôtel Saint-Pol.

In 1409, Jean de Nielles, already chancellor to the queen and a knight known for his loyalty to the Burgundian duke, was made Louis' chancellor also. The duke of Burgundy also appointed Pierre de Fontenay, Louis' maître d'hôtel, while the duke of Orléans chose his chamberlains, alternating between the lords of Blaru and Offemont. The influence of the dukes is apparent even in Louis' buying habits: he frequented the merchants who were the suppliers of Burgundy and Orléans.

== War and death ==
During civil war between the Armagnacs and the Burgundians, Louis was credited with intervening to bring about peace at Chartres in 1409, at Auxerre in 1410, and again in 1412. The peace of Auxerre was mocked by contemporaries as a paix fourrée, a peace made in bad faith. Between the assassination of the Duke of Orléans in 1407 and the revolt of the Cabochiens in 1413, the Duke of Burgundy dominated the court of the Duke of Guyenne. During the revolt of 1413, he replaced his son-in-law's treasurer, François de Nerly, with a man of his own loyalty, Jean de Noident, but he then had to flee Paris. In December 1413, Louis himself pleaded to be rescued from the city, since he did not trust the triumphant Armagnacs.

Louis was not present at the Battle of Agincourt (October 1415), remaining with his father King Charles VI at Rouen. He died 18 December 1415, possibly of dysentery, as recorded by the monk chronicler Michel Pintoin of the Basilica of Saint-Denis. He was buried at Notre-Dame de Paris. His coffin was exhumed in 1699 and his body was found to have disintegrated.

== In literature and film ==
Louis was probably the original recipient of the Chateauroux Breviary. It was also for him that Christine de Pizan wrote her Livre du corps de policie (1406–07) and Livre de paix (1412–13) as instructions for a young ruler.

Louis appears as the unnamed Dauphin in William Shakespeare's Henry V, which incorrectly depicts him commanding troops at Agincourt. He has been represented in film by Max Adrian in 1944, Keith Drinkel in 1979, Michael Maloney in 1989, Edward Akrout in 2012, and most recently Robert Pattinson in The King (2019). Typically, these actors were in their 30s while playing the role, an age which the real Dauphin Louis never reached.

== Sources ==
- Autrand, Françoise. Charles VI le roi fou. Fayard, 1986. ISBN 2-213-01703-4
- Famiglietti, Richard Carl. The French Monarchy in Crisis, 1392–1415, and the Political Role of the Dauphin, Louis of France, Duke of Guyenne. PhD diss. City University of New York, 1982.
- Famiglietti, Richard Carl. Royal Intrigue: Crisis at the Court of Charles VI, 1392–1420. New York, 1986.
- Kennedy, Angus J. "Christine de Pizan, Blasphemy, and the Dauphin, Louis de Guyenne", Medium Aevum 83, 1 (2014): 104–20.
- Lebailly, Emilie (2005). "Le dauphin Louis, duc de Guyenne, et les arts précieux (1409–1415)". Bulletin Monumental (in French). 163, 4 (4): 357–374. doi:10.3406/bulmo.2005.1578.
- Vaughan, Richard (2009). John the Fearless. The Boydell Press.

Louis, Duke of Guyenne House of Valois Cadet branch of the Capetian dynasty Born: 22 January 1397 Died: 18 December 1415
French nobility
Preceded by Charles	Dauphin of Viennois; Count of Valentinois and of Diois; 13 January 1401 – 18 December 1415	Succeeded by John
Preceded by Charles	Duke of Guyenne; 1401 – 18 December 1415	Vacant Title next held by Charles
