= Edward III of Bar =

Duke of Bar

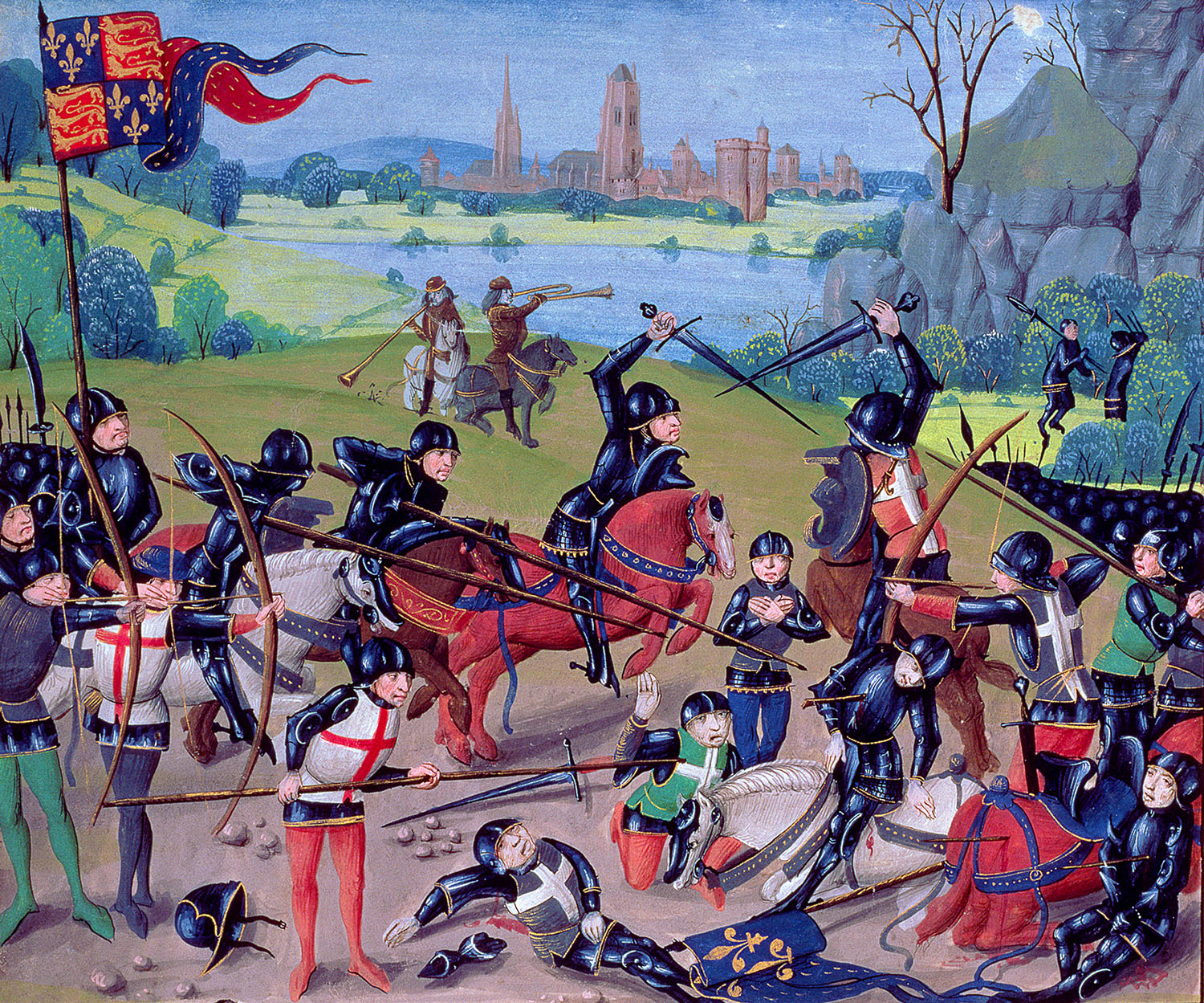
Battle of Agincourt, 15th century miniature.

Edward III of Bar (late June 1377 – 25 October 1415) was made Marquis of Pont-à-Mousson by his father Robert I, Duke of Bar in 1399. His mother was Mary of France, the daughter of King John II of France. He held the marquisate until his death. He became heir to the Duchy of Bar following the deaths of his elder brothers, Henry and Philippe, at or soon after the Battle of Nicopolis in 1396.

In 1405, King Charles VI of France charged him with defending the Boulonnais, then threatened by the English. At the end of 1406 he participated in the Guyenne campaign under the orders of Louis I, Duke of Orléans, but dysentery decimated the French forces. After Louis's assassination in 1407, Edward joined John the Fearless, Duke of Burgundy and rallied the Burgundians. Edward succeeded his father on 12 April 1411 as the Duke of Bar. He was one of the commanders of the French second line and was killed at the Battle of Agincourt and was succeeded by his brother, Louis I. Though he never married, he left several illegitimate children.

== Sources ==
- (in French) Georges Poull, La Maison souveraine et ducale de Bar, 1994
- Barbara Tuchman, A Distant Mirror, 1978, Alfred A. Knopf, New York

German nobility
Preceded by Robert	Duke of Bar; 1411–1415	Succeeded by Louis I
