= Cabochien revolt =

1413 rebellion in Paris

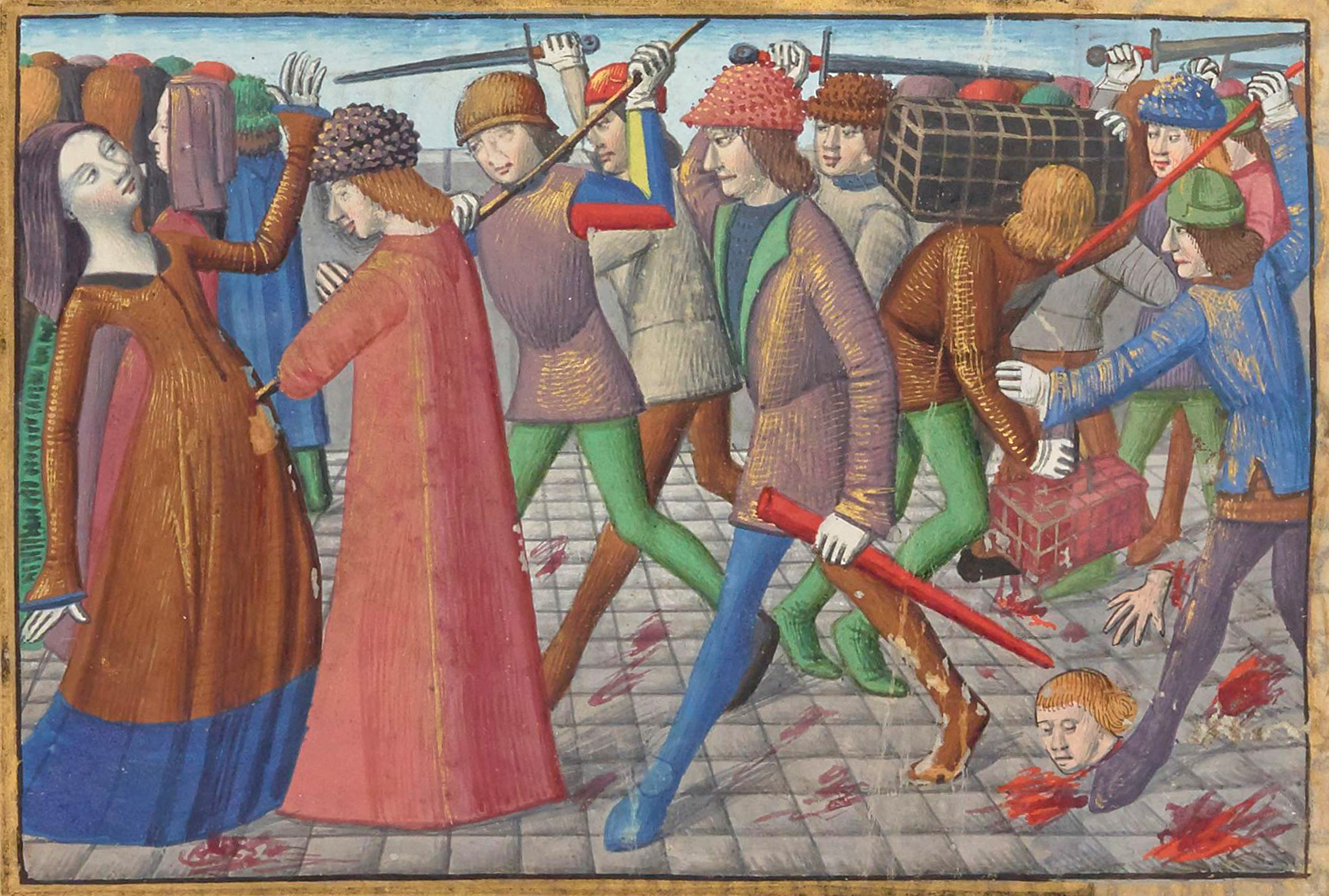
| Date | 27 April – 28 August 1413 |
| Location | Paris, France |

Belligerents
| Armagnacs | Burgundians |

Commanders and leaders
| Bernard VII, Count of Armagnac; Jean Jouvenel des Ursins (POW); Pierre des Essarts (executed) | John the Fearless, Duke of Burgundy; Simon Caboche |

Casualties and losses
| Limited | Several hundred arrested and trialed to death |

The Cabochien revolt was an episode in the civil war between the Armagnacs and the Burgundians which was in turn a part of the Hundred Years' War. It involved a riot, in the spring of 1413 by a faction of butchers known as Cabochiens after their leader Simon Caboche. After a few months of Cabochien power in Paris the revolt was put down. The Burgundian leader John the Fearless was the power behind the revolt, in the context of the ongoing civil war.

== Background ==
In the spring of 1413, John the Fearless, Duke of Burgundy, managed to raise the people of Paris and impose a reform called the Cabochien ordinance. However, after several months, Parisians desiring a return to order supported the return of the Armagnacs.

On 23 November 1407, Louis I, Duke of Orléans, brother of king Charles VI (known as "Charles the Beloved" and "Charles the Mad"), was murdered by masked assassins in the service of John the Fearless. Afterwards, John acquired considerable popularity among the population of Paris.

== Revolt ==
He aligned himself with a popular faction of butchers, the écorcheurs (flayers), named “Cabochiens”, after their commander, a butcher named Simon Lecoustellier, known as Simon Caboche. This group had its origins among butchers of the Grande Boucherie de Paris, a relatively wealthy class of tradespeople not integrated within Parisian high & aristocratic class. In April 1413, in a bid to gain power, John the Fearless encouraged the Cabochiens to revolt. Riotous mobs, sporting distinctive white caps, assaulted Armagnac noblemen and followers, and their properties throughout the city. On April 27, they seized the Bastille Saint-Antoine and took prisoner its defender, Pierre des Essarts, Provost of Paris (Pierre des Essarts was beheaded the following 13 July.) They also forced their way into the Hôtel Saint-Pol, the royal residence, arrested several of the king's men, and incarcerated them in the various prisons of Paris. They controlled Paris for four months, until the last days of July and beginning of August, when the revolt was put down.

Academics took this opportunity to propose administrative reforms known as the “Ordonnance cabochienne", which limited the power of the monarch, giving, for example, greater fiscal control to the Estates General. Although the ordinance carried the name of Caboche, because it was published by 27 May 1413 during the Cabochien revolt, it had been prepared in January–February 1413 by the États généraux de Langue d'Oïl. It was actually the work of advisors of John the Fearless who imposed the ordinance on Charles VI, who signed it on 22 May 1413.

== Resolution ==
However, the exactions of the Cabochiens and of the Burgundians were causing increasing dissatisfaction among the population who began to rise against the Cabochiens. By 3 August, the Cabochiens revolt was over. The Cabochiens who were unable to flee were executed and the ordinance was overturned on 5 September 1413. Simon Caboche was able to escape with the Duke of Burgundy. Caboche re-entered the city six years later.

Charles I, Duke of Orléans, son of the murdered Duke of Orléans, had married Bonne of Armagnac, daughter of the count Bernard VII of Armagnac. The count was a brutal and powerful lord who commanded a number of Gascon troops from the Adour and Garonne in southwestern France. Putting himself at the disposal of his son-in-law, he took control of Paris. In recognition of his help, Bernard VII of Armagnac was made Constable of France on 30 December 1415 in a letter signed by Charles VI.
