= House of Valois-Burgundy =

Cadet branch of the House of Valois

- Parent house: House of Valois
- Country: France; Burgundy
- Founded: 6 September 1363; 663 years ago
- Founder: Philip the Bold
- Final ruler: Mary of Burgundy
- Titles: List: Duke of Burgundy; Duke of Lothier; Duke of Brabant; Duke of Limburg; Duke of Luxemburg; Duke of Lorraine; Duke of Guelders; Count of Flanders; Count of Artois; Count Palatine of Burgundy; Count of Hainaut; Count of Holland; Count of Zeeland; Count of Namur; Count of Zutphen; Count of Boulogne; Count of Vermandois; Count of Ponthieu; Count of Auxerre; Count of Mâcon; Count of Nevers; Count of Rethel; Count of Eu; Count of Charolais; Margrave of Antwerp; Landgrave of Alsace
- Estate: Palace of the Dukes
- Dissolution: 23 March 1500; 526 years ago

The House of Valois-Burgundy (French: Maison de Valois-Bourgogne, Dutch: Huis van Valois-Bourgondië), or the Younger House of Burgundy, was a noble French family deriving from the royal House of Valois. (It is distinct from the Capetian House of Burgundy, descendants of King Robert II of France, though both houses stem from the Capetian dynasty). The Valois-Burgundy family ruled the Duchy of Burgundy from 1363 to 1482 and eventually came to rule vast lands including Artois, Flanders, Luxembourg, Hainault, the county palatine of Burgundy (Franche-Comté), and other lands through marriage, forming what is now known as the Burgundian State.

The term "Valois Dukes of Burgundy" is employed to refer to the dynasty which began after King John II of France granted the French Duchy of Burgundy to his youngest son, Philip the Bold in 1363.

During the Hundred Years' War of 1337–1453, the dukes rivalled their French royal cousins, uniting a great number of French and Imperial fiefs under their rule. However, their plans to establish an autonomous kingdom ultimately failed when the last duke, Charles the Bold, sparked the Burgundian Wars of 1474 to 1477 and was killed in the Battle of Nancy in January 1477. The final ruler of the dynasty was his daughter, Mary (r. 1477–1482). On her death in 1482 her lands outside of France passed to her eldest son, Philip the Handsome, to become the Habsburg Netherlands; in the course of the War of the Burgundian Succession (1477–1482) the King of France had claimed the Duchy of Burgundy itself by escheat. Mary's death in 1482 marked the end of the House of Valois-Burgundy.

== History ==
The former Frankish Kingdom of Burgundy had been divided into an East and West Frankish part by the 843 Treaty of Verdun. While the eastern part evolved to the Kingdom of Burgundy-Arles that included the Free County of Burgundy and was incorporated into the Holy Roman Empire in 1032, the western Duchy of Burgundy, established about 918 by Richard the Justiciar, became a fief of the French royal House of Capet under King Robert II in 1002. To meet the demands of the Burgundian nobles for autonomy, King Robert installed his second son Henry as Duke of Burgundy about 1016, a title that passed to his younger brother Robert I and his descendants after Henry had succeeded his father as King of France in 1031.

The Capetian House of Burgundy became extinct when Duke Philip I died in 1361, before he was able to consummate the marriage with Margaret of Dampierre, heiress of Count Louis II of Flanders. On 28 December 1361, John II of France, the second Valois king, successfully claimed the duchy. The duchy did not merge into the royal domain; it remained a distinct feudal entity, with the Burgundian estates firmly opposing annexation.

In January 1362, John II of France had appointed Henri of Bar, Lord of Pierrefort, as the initial governor, but as early as January 25, 1362, John appointed John of Melun, Count of Tancarville as governor of Burgundy. John then passed the duchy to his youngest son Philip as an apanage in 1363.

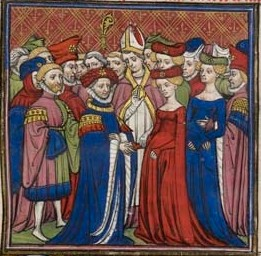
Marriage of Philip the Bold and Margaret of Flanders, Chroniques de France, late 14th century

Philip the Bold ruled as Duke Philip II of Burgundy from 1363 to 1404. In 1369 he himself married the widowed Margaret of Dampierre, and when his father-in-law Count Louis II of Flanders died in 1384, he succeeded him not only in the French counties of Flanders, Artois, Rethel, and Nevers, but also in the Free County of Burgundy, becoming a direct vassal of the Holy Roman Emperor. The next year he arranged the double wedding of his son and heir John the Fearless with Margaret of Wittelsbach, daughter of Duke Albert I of Bavaria-Straubing and sister of Prince William II of Bavaria, who himself married Philip's daughter Margaret. Already upon the death of King Charles V of France in 1380, Philip together with Duke Louis I of Anjou and Duke John of Berry had acted as regent for his minor son King Charles VI. As Charles VI suffered from increasing mental derangement in 1392, Philip tried to spread his influence across the French kingdom, which met with the fierce resistance by the king's younger brother Duke Louis I of Orléans.

Raised in Flanders, Duke John the Fearless succeeded his father in 1404 and unified the heritage of his mother Margaret of Dampierre with the Burgundian duchy. Ceding the French counties of Nevers and Rethel to his younger brothers Philip II and Anthony, he began a skilful see-saw policy to create a scope for free action while the French lands were ravaged by the Hundred Years' War against the Kingdom of England. Like his father he quarrelled with his Valois cousin Louis I of Orléans, whom he had assassinated in 1407. The remaining tensions with the Orléans liensmen led to the French Armagnac–Burgundian Civil War, whereby Duke John allied with King Henry V of England and in 1418 occupied Paris, but was lured into an ambush to ally with Dauphin Charles against the English and murdered by the Armagnac leader Tanneguy III du Chastel the next year.

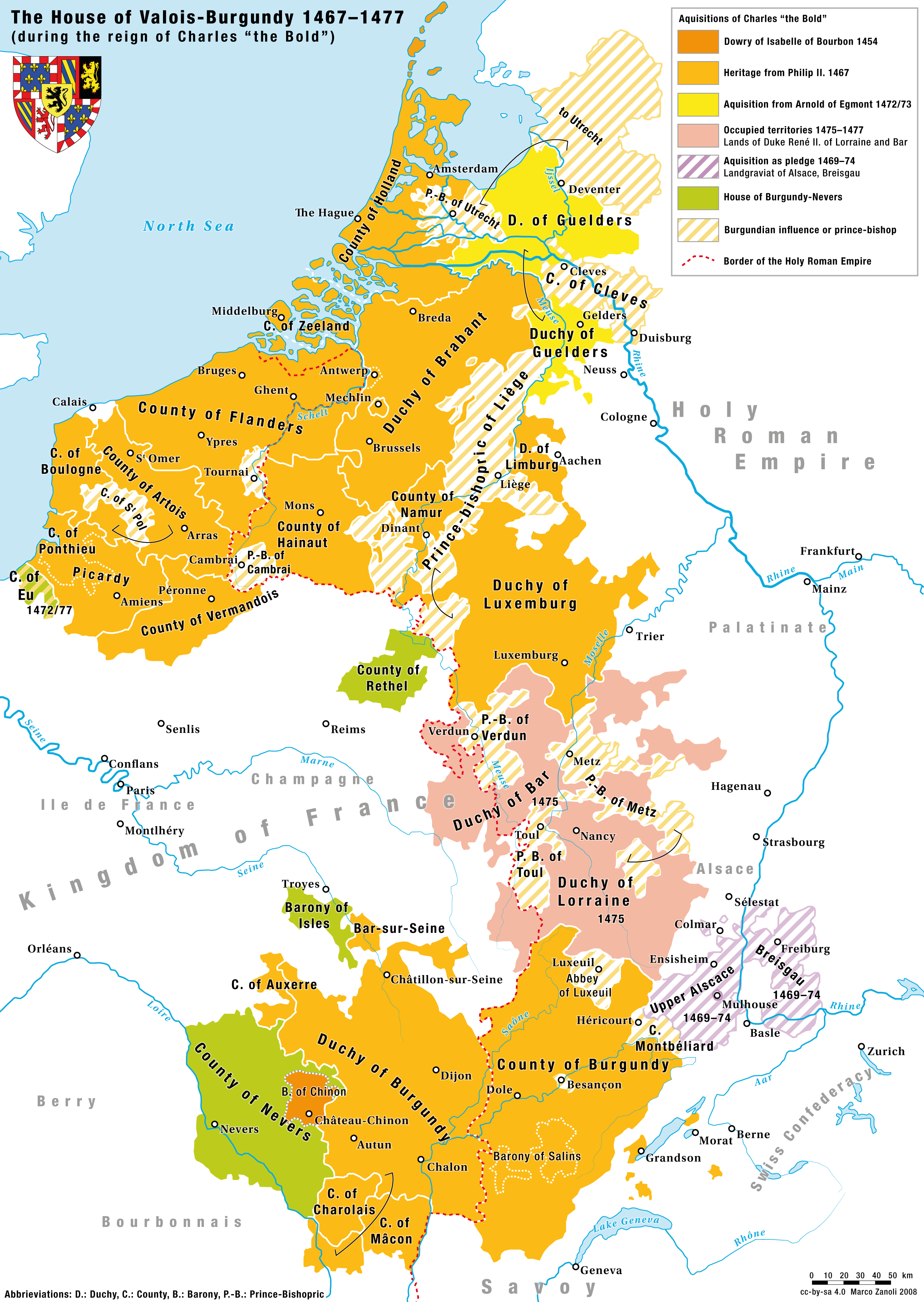
Burgundian possessions under the rule of Duke Charles the Bold 1465–1477

John's son Philip the Good, Duke of Burgundy from 1419, renewed his father's alliance with King Henry V of England when he signed the Treaty of Troyes in 1420 against the French Dauphin Charles. He first concentrated on enlarging the Burgundian territories, acquiring the succession in the Imperial County of Namur in 1421 (with effect from 1429) and succeeding his cousin Duke Philip of Saint-Pol in the Imperial duchies of Brabant and Limburg. He also secured the Bavaria-Straubing heritage of his mother Margaret of Wittelsbach and his uncle Duke John III of Bavaria-Straubing, when finally in 1433 the last Straubing heiress Jacqueline ceded the Imperial counties of County of Hainaut (Hennegau), Zeeland, and Holland, as well as Frisia to him. By the 1435 Congress of Arras Duke Philip acknowledged the rule of King Charles VII of France and in turn reached the formal independence of the Burgundian lands from the French Crown. In 1441 he also purchased the Duchy of Luxembourg from the last duchess regnant Elisabeth of Görlitz.

The Valois-Burgundy duke Charles the Bold, ideal picture of a knightly duke, wore himself out in armed conflicts. With the acquisition of Guelders, the Burgundian Netherlands reached their greatest extent. Charles' plans to accomplish the rise of his dynasty peaked in the negotiations with the Habsburg emperor Frederick III about his elevation to a "King of Burgundy" and the marriage of his daughter Mary to Frederick's son Archduke Maximilian of Austria. Enraged at the reluctance of the emperor, Charles started the unsuccessful Siege of Neuss in 1474 and became involved in the Burgundian Wars against the Duchy of Lorraine and the Old Swiss Confederacy. In consequence, Mary acceded the Burgundian crown when Charles was killed in the 1477 Battle of Nancy.

The Burgundian heritage eventually passed to the Habsburg archduke Maximilian, who married Mary of Burgundy seven months after her father's death and could ward off the claims raised by King Louis XI of France in the 1479 Battle of Guinegate. The French king could only seize the Duchy of Burgundy proper, Artois, and the former Burgundian fiefs in Picardy. The House of Habsburg abruptly rose to a royal dynasty of European scale, however, at the price of the centuries-long France–Habsburg rivalry.

== Dukes of Burgundy (1361–1482) ==
Dukes of Burgundy
House of Valois-Burgundy
Image	Name	Date	Notes
	John II of France	28 December 1361 – 6 September 1363	First son of King Philip VI of France from the House of Valois and his wife Joan of Burgundy. Married Duchess Bonne of Luxembourg in 1332.
	Philip the Bold	1363–1404	Fourth son of King John II of France from the House of Valois and his wife Bonne of Luxembourg. Married Countess Margaret III of Flanders in 1369.
	John the Fearless	1404–1419	First-born son of Philip the Bold. United the heritage of his mother with Burgundy. Married Margaret of Bavaria in 1385.
	Philip the Good	1419–1467	First-born son of John the Fearless. Acquired most of the Burgundian Netherlands.
	Charles the Bold	1467–1477	Only legitimate heir of Philip the Good and his third wife Isabella of Portugal. Last Valois duke of Burgundy, killed in the Battle of Nancy.
	Mary	1477–1482	Only child of Charles the Bold and his second wife Isabella of Bourbon, married the Habsburg archduke Maximilian I of Austria in 1477.

== Coats of Arms ==
See: Coats of Arms of the 2nd House of Burgundy
Category:Coats of arms of the Duchy of Burgundy

Philip the Bold, as Count of Touraine

Philip the Bold, as Duke of Burgundy

John the Fearless, Duke of Burgundy

Philip the Good and Charles the Bold, as Dukes of Burgundy

Charles the Bold, as Count of Charolais

Corneille and Antoine the Grand Bastard
Anthony and Philip, Dukes of Brabant

Philip, as Count of Saint Pol

Philip II, Count of Nevers

== Flags ==
Military flag of the Burgundian State during the reign of Charles the Bold

== See also ==
- History of Burgundy
- Burgundian State
- Genealogy of the 2nd House of Burgundy
- Genealogy of Dukes of Burgundy
- Passport to Pimlico
