= Tanneguy du Châtel =

Grand Master of France

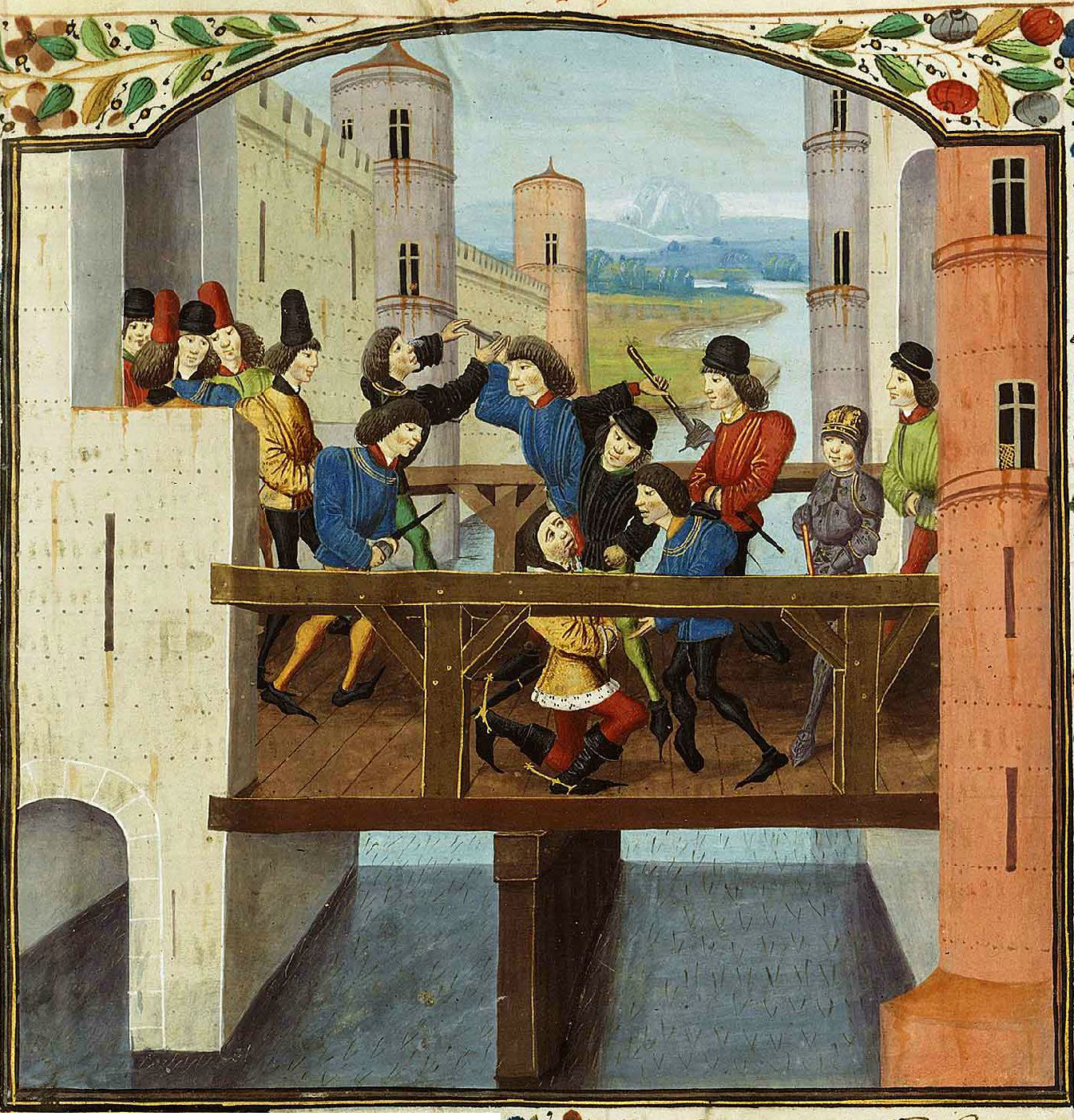
Tanneguy du Châtel (centre, in black) hacking at the Duke of Burgundy with an axe on a bridge in Montereau, in a miniature from around the decade of 1470

Tanneguy III du Châtel (also spelt Tanguy; 1369–1449) was a Breton knight who fought in the Armagnac–Burgundian Civil War and the Hundred Years' War. A member of the Armagnac party, he became a leading adviser of King Charles VII of France, and was one of the assassins of Duke John the Fearless of Burgundy in 1419.

== Life ==
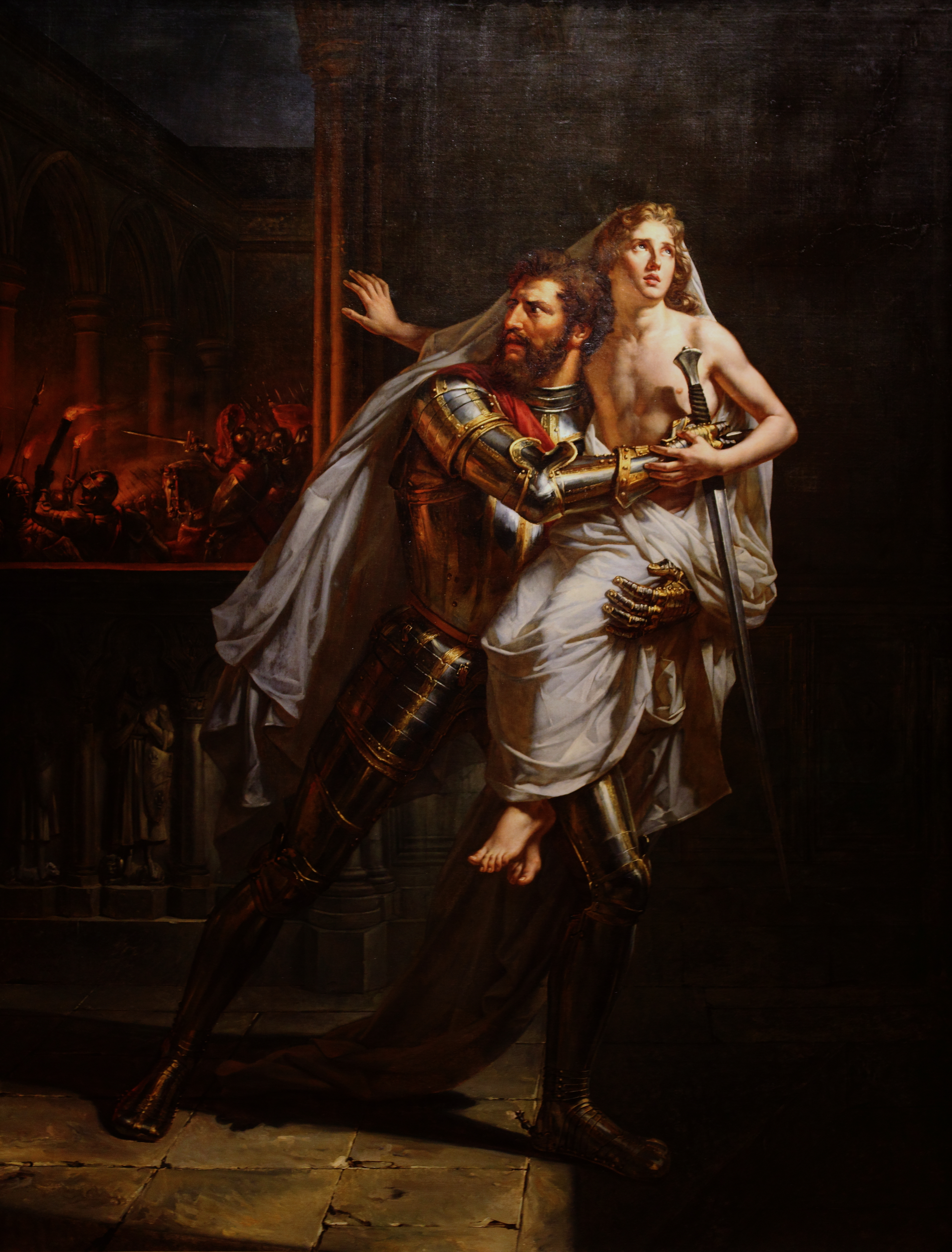
Tanneguy du Châtel saves the dauphin, by Auguste Couder, 1828

In 1415, he was provost of Paris, charged with keeping order in the city. During the civil war between the Armagnacs and Burgundians, he was one of the leaders of the Armagnac faction under Bernard VII, Count of Armagnac, Constable of France. He opposed the partisans of the Duke of Burgundy in their attempts to capture Paris. Alain de Coëtivy, bishop of Avignon, was a nephew of his.

He was a favourite of Dauphin Charles (later Charles VII), whom he saved by taking him out of Paris to safety at the Bastille, and then to Melun at the time of the coup d'état of Paris by the Burgundians led by captain Jean de Villiers de l'Isle-Adam during the night of 28–29 May 1418. With Jean Louvet, another of Charles VII's favourites, he was one of the main instigators of the assassination of John the Fearless, Duke of Burgundy by some Armagnac men-at-arms during his meeting with Charles on the bridge at Montereau on 10 September 1419.

From 1425, his influence waned as Arthur de Richemont's waxed. Also, in 1429, he used all his effort to convince the Dauphin to receive and welcome Joan of Arc – in effect, several of Charles VII's counsellors supported the principle of a rapprochement with Burgundy in order to present a united front against England, which could not have been achieved without du Chastel's efforts.

== Tanguy IV du Chastel, his nephew ==
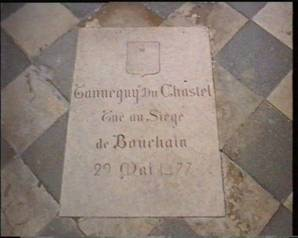
The tombstone of Tanneguy IV du Chastel (nephew) at Cléry-Saint-André.

His nephew, Tanneguy IV du Chastel, began as governor of Roussillon, before fleeing to Brittany, where he became grand maître d'hôtel of Francis II, Duke of Brittany. He next was in the service of king Louis XI of France, and was killed in 1477 at the siege of Bouchain in Picardy, in the course of a war against the Duchy of Burgundy, after the death of Charles the Bold. Louis XI had him buried at the Basilique Notre-Dame at Cléry-Saint-André (Loiret), where Louis XI himself was buried in 1483.

== Bibliography ==
- Sumption, Jonathan (2015). The Hundred Years War IV: Cursed Kings. London: Faber & Faber. ISBN 978-0-571-27454-3.
- Histoire des ducs de Bourgogne de la maison de Valois, 1364–1477 de Prosper Brugière baron de Barante- 1782-1866, conservé à la Bibliothèque nationale de France (BnF N087463). For a detailed account of the "affaire du pont de Montereau" (Extracts from the document)
- Albert Mirot, Vie politique de Tanguy du Chastel, thesis for the École des chartes, 1926
- Philippe de Commines, Mémoire des faits du feu roy Louis onziesme: see Index: Tanneguy du Chastel (son), Montereau-Fault-Yonne: the second passage on Montereau recounts the assassination of John the Fearless.

Honorary titles
Preceded by Louis, Count of Vendôme	Grand Master of France; 1422–1440	Succeeded by Charles de Culant
