= Burgundian (party) =

French political allegiance

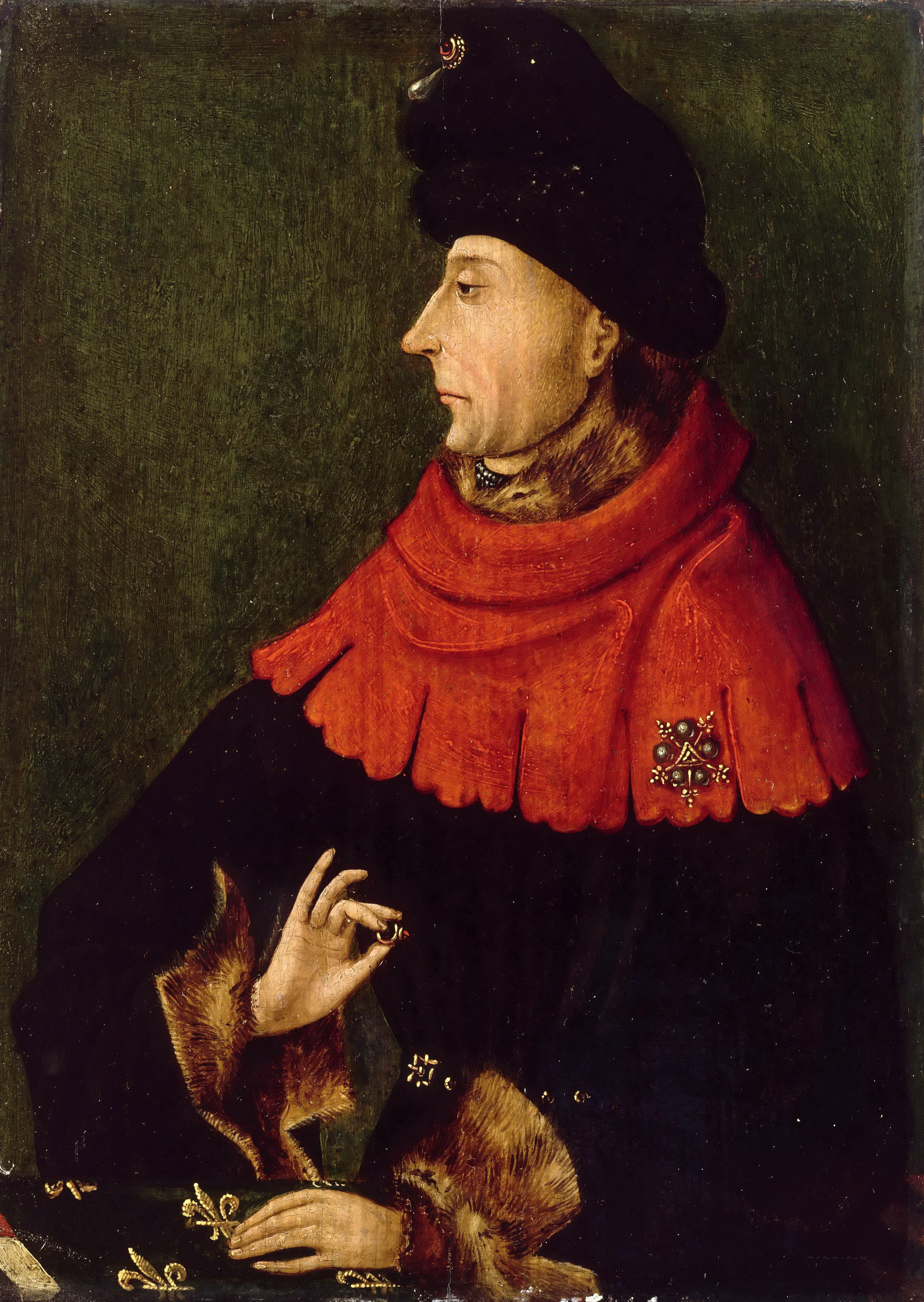
John the Fearless, Duke of Burgundy

The Burgundian party was a political allegiance against France that formed during the latter half of the Hundred Years' War. The term "Burgundians" refers to the supporters of the Duke of Burgundy, John the Fearless, that formed after the assassination of Louis I, Duke of Orléans in 1407. Their opposition to the Armagnac party, the supporters of Charles I, Duke of Orléans, led to a civil war in the early 15th century, itself part of the larger Hundred Years' War.

== Geography ==
The Duke of Burgundy had inherited a large number of lands scattered from what is now the border of Switzerland up to the North Sea. The Duchy of Burgundy had been granted as an appanage to Philip the Bold in 1363, which was followed by other territories inherited by Philip and his heirs during the late 14th and 15th centuries, including the County of Burgundy (the Franche-Comté), Flanders, Artois and many other domains in what are now Belgium, Luxembourg, the Netherlands and northeastern France. Prosperous textile manufacture in the Low Countries made this among the wealthiest realms in Europe and explained their desire to maintain trade with wool-producing England.

== Politics ==
The Burgundian Party adopted a St. Andrew's Cross formed from two rough cut branches with buds as its symbol. The symbol is the predecessor to the Cross of Burgundy.

Partisan use of the term "Burgundian" arose from a feud between John I, Duke of Burgundy and Louis I, Duke of Orléans. The latter was the brother of King Charles VI; the former was his cousin. When Charles VI's mental illness interrupted his ability to rule in 1392, John I and Louis I vied for power in a bitter dispute. Popular rumor attributed an adulterous affair to the Duke of Orléans and French Queen consort Isabeau of Bavaria, and that the later King Charles VII of France is the illegitimate son of theirs. Supporters of the two dukes became known as "Burgundians" and "Orléanists", respectively.

Other than in Burgundy's own lands, the Duke's supporters were particularly powerful in Paris, where the butchers' guild notably closely supported him.

The partisan terms outlasted the lives of these two men. John I, Duke of Burgundy ordered the assassination of Louis I, Duke of Orléans in 1407. Burgundian partisans at the University of Paris published a treatise justifying this as tyrannicide in the belief that the Duke of Orléans had been plotting to kill the king and usurp the throne. Leadership of his party passed nominally to his son, Charles, but in fact to the young duke's father-in-law, Bernard VII, Count of Armagnac, who would form a league in opposition to the Burgundians in Gien, the Armagnac party.

Both parties sought the support of the Kingdom of England. The Armagnacs supported a treaty with English King Henry IV to secure his military. The Burgundians remained neutral when the English invaded Normandy. That neutrality led to Orléans's capture by the English at Agincourt in 1415. After Armagnac's murder by Burgundian mobs in Paris after a Burgundian coup in 1418, leadership of the party devolved upon the young Dauphin, who retreated to Bourges.

After 1418, Burgundy controlled both Paris and the person of the king. However, the whole dispute was proving deleterious to the war effort against the English, as both sides focused more on fighting one another than on preventing the English from conquering Normandy. In 1419, the Duke and the Dauphin negotiated a truce to allow both sides to focus on fighting the English. However, in a further parley, the Duke was murdered by the Dauphin's bodyguard supporters as revenge for the murder of Louis I, Duke of Orléans 12 years earlier.

Leadership of the Burgundians passed to Philip III the Good, Duke of Burgundy. who was furious from the assassination and made an alliance with England. His influence and that of the queen, Isabeau, who had joined the Burgundian party induced the mad king to sign the Treaty of Troyes with England in 1420 by which Charles VI recognized King Henry V of England as his heir and Charles's own son, the Dauphin, was disinherited.

When Henry V and Charles VI both died within months of each other in 1422, leaving Henry's 1-year-old son Henry VI of England as heir to both England and France, Philip the Good and the Burgundians continued to support the English. Nevertheless, dissension grew between Philip and the English regent, John, Duke of Bedford. Although family ties between Burgundy and Bedford, who had married the Duke's sister, prevented an outright rupture during Bedford's lifetime, Burgundy gradually withdrew support for the English and began to seek an understanding with the Dauphin, now King Charles VII of France. Both sides finally reconciled at the Congress of Arras in 1435, which resulted in a treaty which allowed the French king to finally return to his capital in 1436.

== Notable Burgundians ==
- John the Fearless, Duke of Burgundy.
- Philip the Good, Duke of Burgundy.
- Jean Petit, Theologian at the University of Paris, committed .
- Claude de Beauvoir, Marshal of France.
- Waleran III, Count of Ligny, Constable of France from 1411 to 1413, defended Paris with Enguerrand de Bournonville from the Armagnacs in 1411. In 1413, following the Cabochien Revolt, he and the Burgundians was driven out of the capital, and he lost his Constableship to Charles I d'Albret.
- Enguerrand de Bournonville, a Burgundian general, defended Paris from the Armagnacs in 1411. In 1414, he defended Soissons from the besieging forces of King Charles VI of France, but was defeated and executed on the king's orders.
- Nicolas Rolin, Chancellor of Burgundy.
- Simon Caboche, prominent member of the Parisian butcher's guild.
- Pierre Cauchon, Bishop of Beauvais, served as a judge in the trial of Joan of Arc which led to her execution.
- John II, Count of Ligny, led the Burgundian forces at the Siege of Compiègne and captured and sold Joan of Arc to the English.
- Jean de Villiers, Marshal of France, a Burgundian captain, led the Burgundian coup d'état of Paris in 1418, defended Paris with the English in 1429 and besieged the Armagnacs with the English at Saint-Denis in 1435.

== See also ==
- Joan of Arc
- Duke of Burgundy
- History of France
- Arthur III, Duke of Brittany (Arthur de Richemont)
- Burgundians
- Armagnac–Burgundian Civil War
