= Treaty of Bourges =

The Treaty of Bourges was an agreement between Henry IV, King of England and Charles, Duke of Orléans signed on 18 May 1412. In return for military aid against the Burgundians, the Armagnacs offered Henry IV full sovereignty in Gascony. Due to a temporary peace between the Armagnacs and Burgundians, the treaty was never fulfilled.

== Context ==
In November 1407, Louis I, Duke of Orléans was assassinated, starting a civil war in France between the Armagnacs and the Burgundians. In consequence, both parties sought Henry IV's assistance for the war.

In 1411, Henry IV sent a small contingent to help John the Fearless, Duke of Burgundy. In 1412, the Armagnacs offered the restitution of Aquitaine in return for military aid.

== Agreement ==
On May 18, 1412, the Armagnacs recognized the sovereignty of Henry IV in the Duchy of Aquitaine in return for an army of 4,000 men.

In exchange for military aid the allied princes of France, John, Duke of Berry, Charles, Duke of Orléans, John I, Duke of Bourbon and John I, Duke of Alençon pledged to help Henry IV recover Aquitaine and agreed to pay homage to the English sovereign for the fiefs they possess in the duchy. This treaty also stipulated that Poitou and Angoulême, possessions of John of Berry and Charles of Orléans, were to be held by them of the English crown and would be handed over to the King of England upon the death of the two princes.

A more immediate danger awaited the kingdom of France. This treaty of alliance stipulated that twenty fortresses were to be handed over to Henry IV of England immediately. As part of the agreement, Thomas of Lancaster, Duke of Clarence, devastated western France south of the Loire.

The terms of the agreement were never fulfilled due to a temporary peace between the Armagnacs and the Burgundians signed at Auxerre in August 1412, also the death of Henry IV in 1413.
