= Armagnac–Burgundian Civil War =

French dynastic war from 1407 to 1435

- Part of the Hundred Years' War
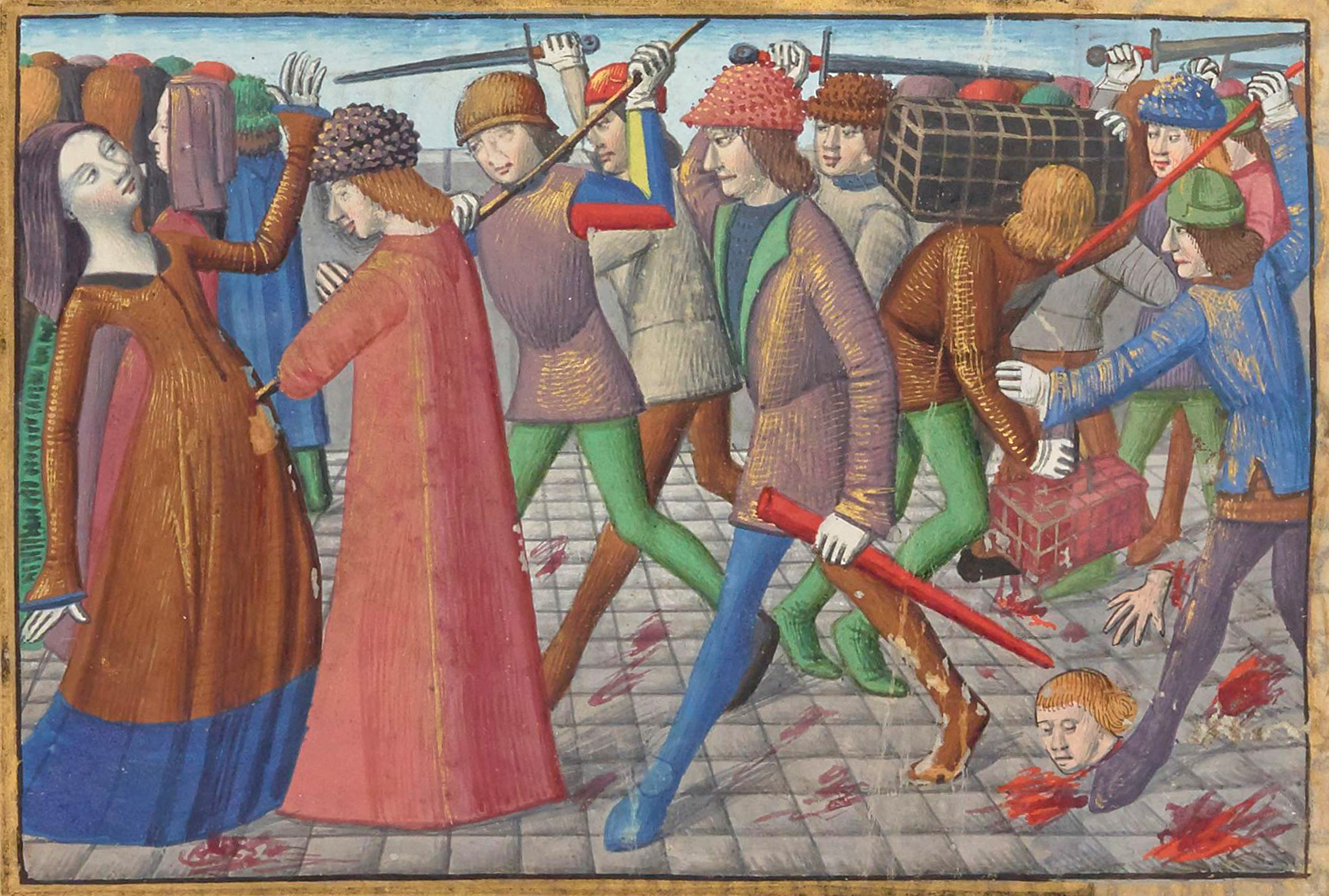
- The Cabochien revolt in 1413
Date	23 November 1407 – 21 September 1435 (27 years, 9 months, 4 weeks and 1 day)
Location	Kingdom of France
Result	Treaty of Arras: Armagnac and Burgundian reconciliation

Belligerents
Armagnac party	Burgundian party	England

Commanders and leaders
Louis I of Orléans X; Charles I of Orléans (POW); Bernard VII of Armagnac †; John of Berry; Charles I d'Albret †; Louis II of Anjou; John I of Bourbon (POW); John I of Alençon †; John V of Britanny; Charles VII of France	John the Fearless X; Philip the Good; Simon Caboche; Jean de Villiers; John II of Luxembourg	Henry IV #; Henry V #; John, Duke of Bedford

The Armagnac–Burgundian Civil War was a conflict between two cadet branches of the French royal family: the House of Orléans (Armagnac faction) and the House of Burgundy (Burgundian faction) from 1407 to 1435. It began during a lull in the Hundred Years' War against the English and overlapped with the Western Schism of the papacy.

== Causes ==
The leaders of both parties were closely related to the French king through the male line. For that reason, they were called "princes of the blood" and exerted much influence on the affairs of the kingdom of France. Their rivalries and disputes for government control would serve as much of the basis for the conflict. The Orléans branch of the family, also referred to as the House of Valois-Orléans, stemmed from Louis I, Duke of Orléans, younger son of King Charles V of France (r. 1364–1380). The House of Valois-Burgundy originated from Charles V's youngest brother, Philip the Bold, the Duke of Burgundy. Both their respective namesake duchies of Orléans and Burgundy were held in the status of appanage, as none of its holders was first in the line of succession to the French throne.

The war's causes were rooted in the unstable reign of King Charles VI of France and also pitted different economic systems against each other: France was very strong in agriculture, with a strong feudal and religious system, while the Duchy of Burgundy was dominated by trade, artisans crafting products, the middle classes, and emerging cities. Burgundy's constituent County of Flanders, with its clothing producers and merchants, significantly depended on the raw material import of English wool.

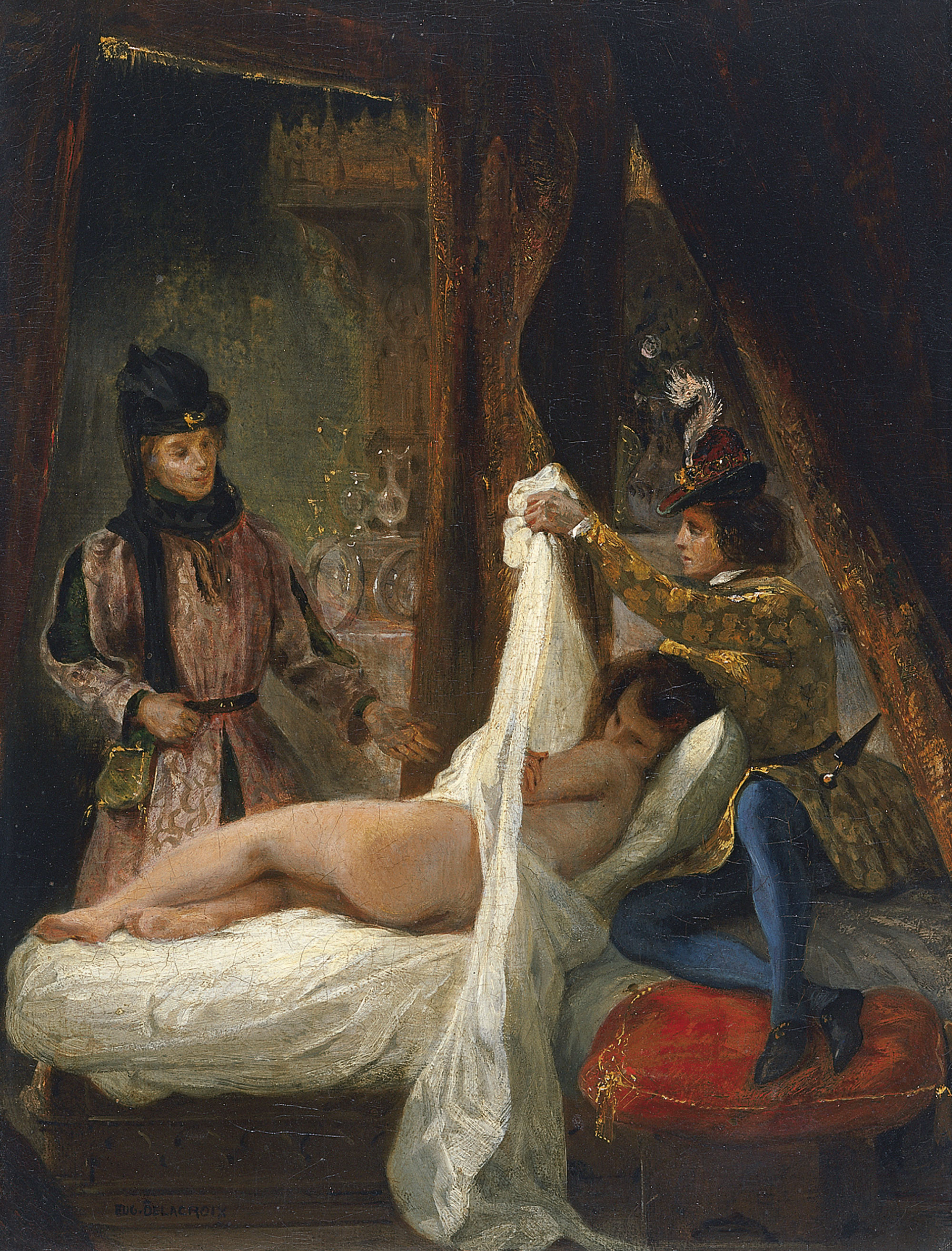
Louis of Orléans unveiling a mistress – Eugène Delacroix

With Charles VI mentally ill from 1393, his wife, Queen Isabeau of Bavaria, presided over a regency council, on which sat the grandees of the kingdom. The uncle of Charles VI, Philip the Bold, Duke of Burgundy, who acted as regent during the king's minority from 1380 to 1388, was a significant influence on the queen (he had organized the royal marriage during his regency). That influence progressively shifted to Louis I, Duke of Orléans, the king's brother, and it was suspected, the queen's lover. On the death of Philip the Bold, his son John the Fearless, who was less linked to Isabeau, lost influence at court. The other uncle of Charles VI, John, Duke of Berry, served as a mediator between the Orléans party (which would become the Armagnacs) and the Burgundy party, whose rivalry increased and eventually resulted in civil war.

To oppose the territorial expansion of the Dukedom of Burgundy, the Duke of Orléans acquired Luxembourg in 1402. While Louis I of Orléans, getting 90% of his income from the royal treasury, bought lands and strongholds in the eastern marches of the kingdom that the Burgundians considered their private hunting ground, John the Fearless, lacking the fiery prestige of his father, saw royal largess towards him drying up; Philip received 200,000 livres per year, but John had to satisfy himself with 37,000.

The Duke of Orléans, son-in-law of the Duke of Milan Gian Galeazzo Visconti and holding the title for more or less hypothetical fiefdoms in the Italian Peninsula, wanted to let Charles VI intervene militarily in his favour. In addition, he seemed to want to let the Anglo-French truce break down, even so far as provoking King Henry IV of England to a duel, which John the Fearless could not allow since Flemish industry depended totally on imported English wool and would have been ruined by an embargo on English goods.

The quarrel at first respected all forms of courtesy: John the Fearless adopted the nettle as his emblem, and Louis I of Orléans chose the gnarled stick and the Duke of Burgundy the plane or rabot (distributing "rabotures", or badges, to his supporters).

== Outbreak of the war ==
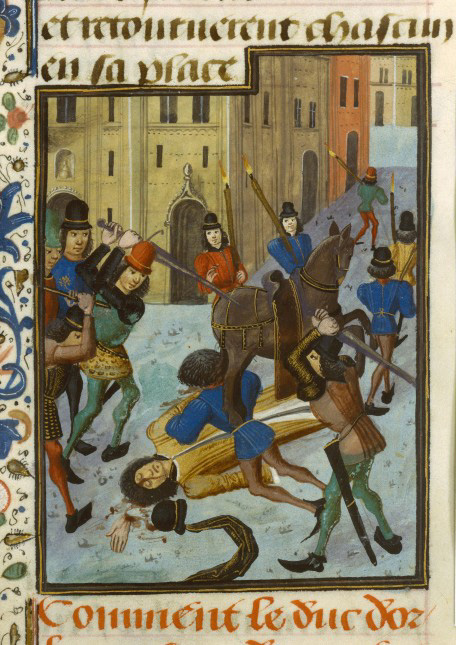
The assassination of Louis I, Duke of Orléans in Paris in 23 November 1407

The king's brother, Louis I, Duke of Orléans, "who whinnied like a stallion after almost all the beautiful women", was accused of having wanted to seduce or worse, "esforcier", Margaret of Bavaria, the Duchess consort of Burgundy, wife of the Duke of Burgundy John the Fearless. Moreover, even if it was only a rumor, that seducer was, as Burgundian propaganda ran, the queen's lover and the birth father of Charles, the future King Charles VII. Louis was undoubtedly close to the queen and benefited from the benevolence of his brother, King Charles VI, whenever he was out of crisis; he thus succeeded in ousting the Burgundians on the counsel.

Ousted from power and toyed with by Louis, that was too much for John the Fearless. Taking advantage of rising anger among the taxpayers, constantly under pressure in peacetime and noting that their taxes serve to finance court festivities, John began to campaign for support, financing demagoguery (promising, for example, tax cuts and state reforms, that is, a controlled monarchy). He thus won over the merchants, the small people and the university.

John threatened Paris in 1405 with a demonstration of his power, but even that did not prove sufficient to restore his influence. He thus decided to get rid of his exasperating rival, having him murdered on rue Vieille du Temple in Paris on 23 November 1407, while he was leaving the queen's residence at Hôtel Barbette, a few days after she had given birth to her twelfth child, Philip (died in the same year). Thomas de Courteheuse then sent word to Louis that the king, Charles VI of France, urgently needed him at Hôtel Saint-Paul. Leaving the Hôtel Barbette, Louis was stabbed by fifteen masked criminals led by Raoulet d'Anquetonville, a servant of the Duke of Burgundy. Louis's escort of valets and guards were powerless to protect him. John had the support of the Paris population and university, which he had won over by promising the establishment of an ordinance like that of 1357. Thus able to take power, he could also publicly confess and acknowledge the assassination. Far from hiding it, he publicized it in an elegy in praise of tyrannicide by the Sorbonne University theologian Jean Petit. Finally, the assassination unleashed a civil war that would last 28 years.

== Civil war ==
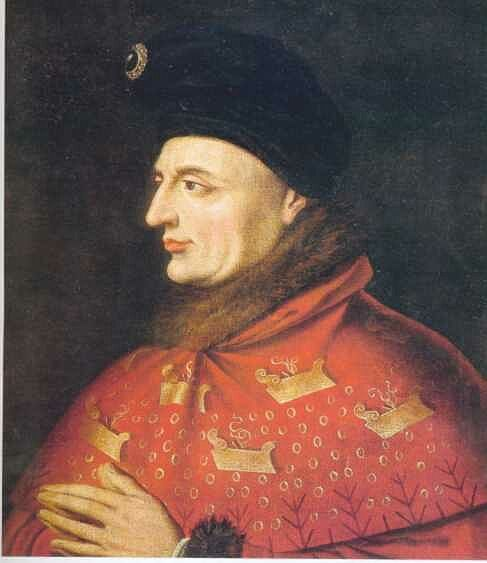
John the Fearless – head of the Burgundian party – sporting the "rabotures"

Intending to avenge his father, Charles I, Duke of Orléans backed the enemies of the Duke of Burgundy wherever he could. In 1409, a peace concluded at Chartres seemed to end hostilities. With the marriage of Charles and Bonne of Armagnac at Gien in 1410, the Duke of Orléans, his new father-in-law, the Count of Armagnac and the grandees of France formed a league against John the Fearless and his supporters. The marriage gave the Orléans faction a new head to replace the murdered Louis, Bernard VII, Count of Armagnac. Other members of the league included the Dukes of Berry, Bourbon and Brittany, Alençon, Anjou and the Lord of Albret - the Constable of France.

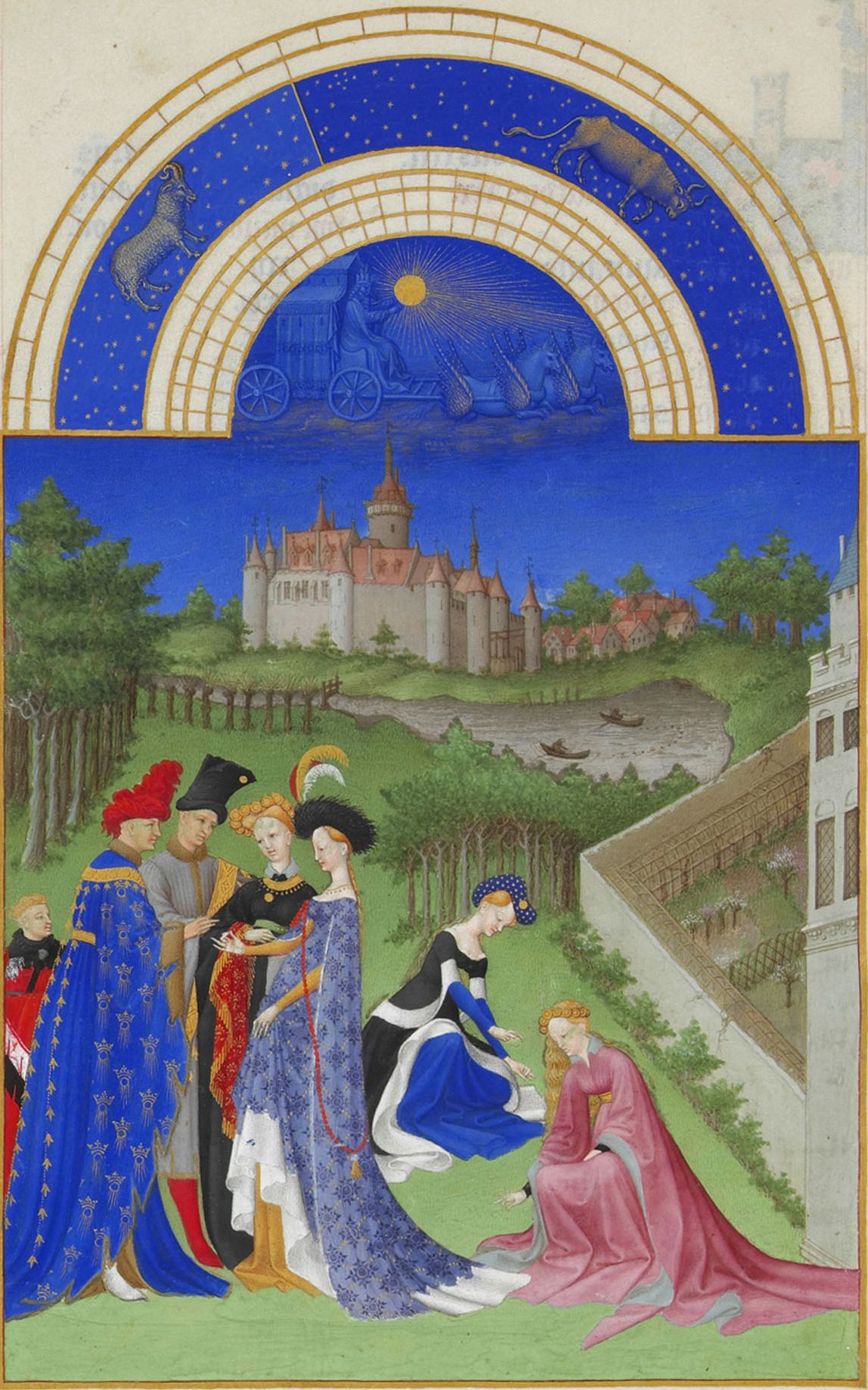
Marriage of Charles I, Duke of Orléans to Bonne of Armagnac at the Château de Dourdan, from the manuscript Très Riches Heures du Duc de Berry.

Bernard VII recruited warbands from southern France and Gascony that fought with unheard-of ferocity: the Écorcheurs. At their head, he ravaged the vicinity of Paris and advanced into the Saint-Marcel suburb. A new treaty, signed at Bicêtre on 2 November 1410, suspended hostilities, but both sides had taken up arms again as early as spring 1411. In October 1411, with an army 60,000 strong, including some English crossbowmen mercenaries, the Duke of Burgundy entered Paris by Waleran III, Count of Ligny and Saint-Pol and Enguerrand de Bournonville's request (as the Armagnacs took Saint-Cloud and were threatening the city) and attacked the Bretons allied to the Armagnacs, who had retrenched at La Chapelle. He had to withdraw in the end, but on the night of 8 to 9 November, he left via the Porte Saint-Jacques, marched across Saint-Cloud, and decisively defeated the Écorcheurs there. Then John the Fearless pursued the princes of Orléans and their allies to Bourges, which Orléans was besieging, but the royal army appeared before the city on 11 June 1412. Another peace was signed at Bourges on 15 July and confirmed at Auxerre on 22 August.

The English took advantage of the situation by punctually supporting the two parties or buying their neutrality. The Armagnacs concluded the Treaty of Bourges with King Henry IV of England on 18 May 1412 to prevent an Anglo-Burgundian alliance. So they yielded Guyenne to him and recognised his suzerainty over Poitou, Angoulême and Périgord. All the same, John the Fearless managed the English well since an English wool embargo could ruin the cloth merchants of Flanders.

In 1413, John the Fearless supported the Cabochien Revolt that brought about a slaughter in Paris. The Parisian population, terrified, called on the Armagnacs for aid. Their troops retook the city in 1414. When King Henry V of England renewed hostilities in 1415, the Duke of Burgundy remained neutral, leaving Henry able to defeat the French army (essentially provided by the Armagnacs), at the Battle of Agincourt on 25 October 1415.

On 29 May 1418, thanks to the treason of a certain Perrinet Leclerc and the support of the artisans and the university, Paris was delivered to Marshal Jean de Villiers de L'Isle-Adam, captain of a troop favouring the Duke of Burgundy. On the following 12 June, the leader Bernard VII, Count of Armagnac and other Armagnacs were slaughtered by a mob. John thus became master of Paris once again, so he entered into negotiations with the English, in which he seemed willing to welcome the king of England's claim on the French throne. It thus became imperative for the Dauphin to negotiate a rapprochement with the Burgundians, again to avoid an Anglo-Burgundian alliance. John, on his part, had become master of a large part of the kingdom after his capture of Paris, but his finances were at rock bottom. John was thus in favor of meeting the Dauphin (who was later Charles VII of France) to sign up for an advantageous peace, so several meetings were organized.

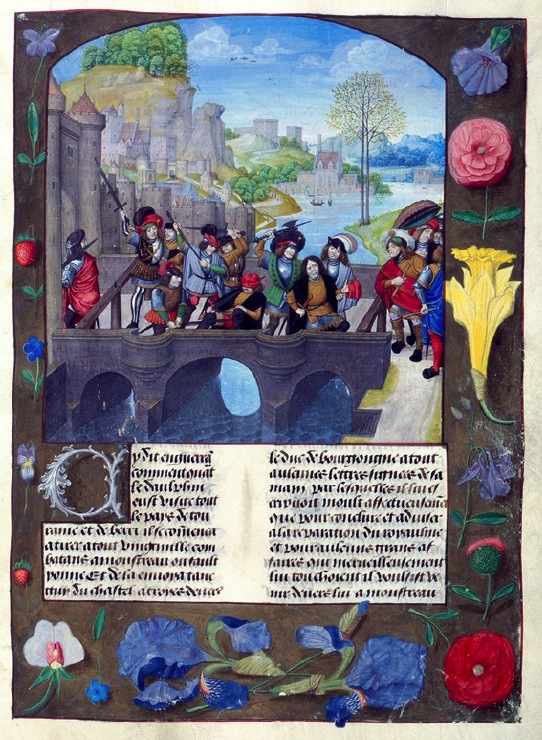
Assassination of John the Fearless, from a miniature of the Master of the Prayer Books around 1500.

=== Assassination of John the Fearless ===
However, having set a precedent for assassinations, on 10 September 1419, John himself was murdered on the bridge at Montereau-Fault-Yonne while he was in the town for an interview with Charles. Both sides agreed to meet on the bridge. Charles's men, including Tanneguy III du Châtel and Jean Louvet, accused the Burgundians of not keeping their promise to break off their alliances with the English. They, on high alert because they had heard that John intended to kidnap or attack the Dauphin, reacted swiftly when the Lord of Navailles raised his sword. In the ensuing scuffle, the duke was killed. This act prevented all appeasement, and thereby enabled a continuation of English military successes with the collusion of Burgundy.

==== Aftermath ====
Philip III the Good, the new Duke of Burgundy, then allied with the English, which resulted in the Treaty of Troyes in 1420. The treaty disinherited the Dauphin Charles and handed the succession to King Henry V of England through a marriage to Charles VI's daughter, Catherine of Valois. The treaty named Henry "regent and heir of France" (although the English had effective control only over northern France and Guyenne) until Charles's death. The treaty was denounced by the Armagnacs, who reasoned "that the king belongs to the crown and not vice versa". Despite his expectations, Henry V predeceased his sickly father-in-law by a few months in 1422. In 1429, the intervention of Joan of Arc culminated in a successful campaign that allowed Charles VII to be annointed King of France at Reims Cathedral, the traditional site of French kings' consecration, on 17 July 1429. The ten-year-old King Henry VI of England was crowned as "King of France" on 16 December 1431 at Notre-Dame de Paris.

== End of the war ==
Territory controlled in 1429 by England, her Burgundian allies (in orange), and France (in yellow). The Burgundian State is in red.

Engaged in a patient reconquest of French territory, Charles VII wished to isolate the English from the Burgundians. In 1435, he concluded the Treaty of Arras with Philip the Good, the Duke of Burgundy ending the civil war. Philip the Good was personally exempted from rendering homage to Charles VII (for having been complicit in his father's murder). The agreement officially ended the war and allowed Charles VII to recapture practically all the English continental possessions, leaving them in 1453 with Calais alone, ending the Hundred Years' War. Philip the Good and his third wife later secured the release of Charles I, Duke of Orléans, in 1440 ending the feud between the two houses.

== List of major actions ==
- Siege of Vellexon (1409–1410)
- Siege of Rethel (1411)
- Battle of Saint-Rémy-du-Plain (1412)
- Siege of Bourges (1412)
- Siege of Dreux (1412)
- Cabochien revolt (1413)
- Siege of Compiègne (1414)
- Siege of Soissons (1414)
- Siege of Arras (1414)
- Siege of Corbeil (1417)
- Siege of Senlis (1418)
- Paris coup d'état and massacres (1418)
- Siege of Gallardon
- Battle of Mons-en-Vimeu

== See also ==
- Journal d'un bourgeois de Paris
- Enguerrand de Bournonville
