= Assassination of John the Fearless =

1419 murder in Montereau, France

Coordinates: 48.3872°N 2.9590°E

Assassination of John The Fearless
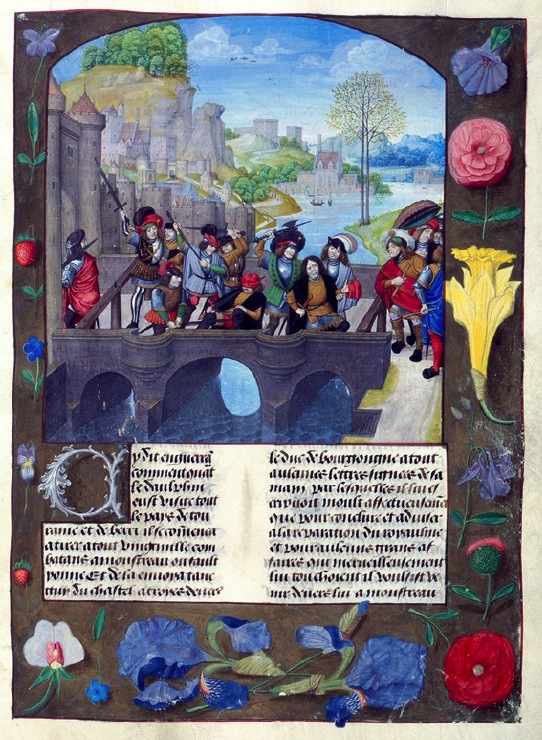
- Miniature c. 1500, by the Master of the Prayer Books
- Location: Montereau, France
- Date: 10 September 1419; 607 years ago
- Target: John the Fearless
- Attack type: Assassination, stabbing
- Deaths: 1
- Perpetrators: Tanneguy du Chastel, Jean Louvet, and their men-at-arms

John the Fearless, Duke of Burgundy, was assassinated on the bridge at Montereau on 10 September 1419 during a parley with the French Dauphin (the future Charles VII of France), by Tanneguy III du Chastel and Jean Louvet, the Dauphin's close counsellors.

== Context ==
The assassination took place during the Hundred Years War. Two rival factions, the Armagnacs and the Burgundians, vied for power within the French regency council headed by the queen consort, Isabeau of Bavaria. The Duke of Orléans and leader of the Armagnacs, Louis I of Orléans, is said to have gained an advantage by becoming the queen's lover, with the subsequent allegation that Charles VII was the Duke of Orléans' illegitimate son. John the Fearless, sensing that he was losing power, had Louis I of Orléans assassinated in Paris in 1407. This event led to a civil war between the Armagnacs and the Burgundians. When the English invaded Normandy, John the Fearless manoeuvred to deal with them carefully, because the Low Countries, which belonged to him, were dependent on the supply of English wool for the production of draperies. Therefore, he only sent a few troops to fight them. He profited from the war by taking power in Paris, supported by the academics and artisans, although two of his brothers, Anthony, Duke of Brabant, and Philip II, Count of Nevers, died fighting for France during the war.

However, since the English had crushed the French knights at Agincourt in 1415, putting an end to the civil war was urgent. John the Fearless and the Dauphin Charles met on 8 July 1419, at Pouilly-le-Fort, then again on 11 July, when they agreed the Treaty of Pouilly-le-Fort. On 19 July, their forthcoming reconciliation was celebrated in Paris with a Te Deum. That, however, was delayed by an English attack which, progressing along the course of the Seine, seized Poissy on 31 July and threatened Paris. The Duke of Burgundy had the royal family evacuated to Troyes, in the East.

Finally, John and Charles agreed to seal their alliance on the bridge across the Seine at Montereau on 10 September 1419.

== Motives ==
- The Armagnacs could not tolerate a rapprochement between the Dauphin and the Burgundians, which would diminish their influence.
- They wanted to avenge the assassination of Duke Louis I of Orléans (1407), their former leader.
- It was suspected but not proven that Duke John the Fearless was also behind the deaths of two of Dauphin Charles's brothers, Dauphins Louis and John.

== The assassination ==
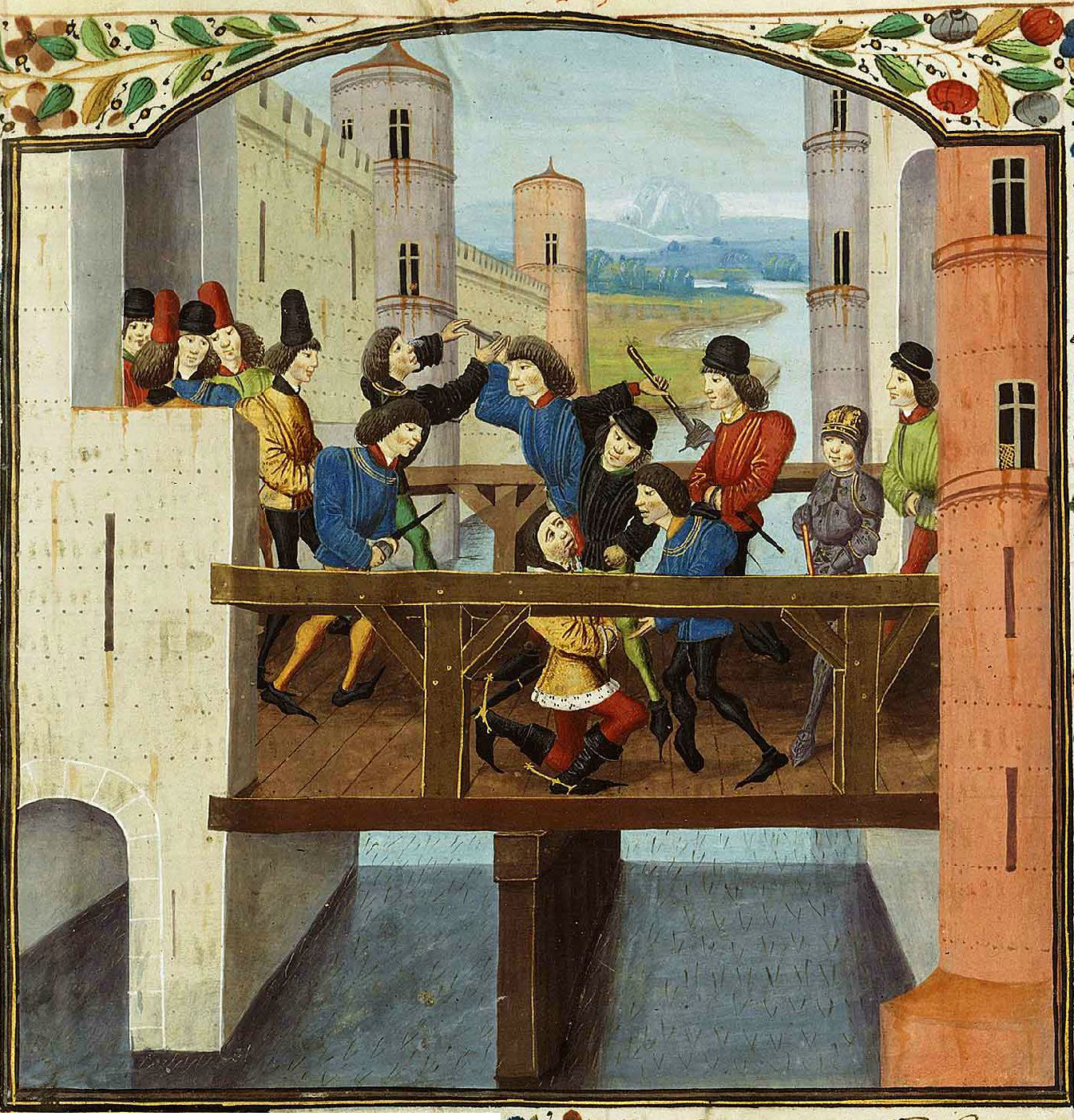
Assassination of John the Fearless, on the Bridge of Montereau in 1419, detail of a 1470s miniature.

On 10 September 1419, the Dauphin and John the Fearless, with their men-at-arms, arrived on the two banks of the Seine, on either side of the bridge of Montereau. John the Fearless was informed that his life was in danger, and his entourage increased its watch in order to protect the Duke. The same was done for the Dauphin. In the middle of the bridge, carpenters had put up two barriers with a door on each side, creating an enclosure for the meeting. It had been agreed that the two rivals would enter the enclosure, each with an escort of ten people, and that the doors would be closed during the meeting. Each of the ten men had taken an oath. Despite the arrangements that had been made, the Duke of Burgundy had second thoughts about the meeting.

The atmosphere was tense. The Duke knelt with respect before the Dauphin, who feigned indifference. Rising, John looked for support by putting his hand on the hilt of his sword. "You put your hand on your épée in the presence of His Highness the Dauphin?" one of the Dauphin's companions, Lord Robert of Loire, asked him. Tanneguy III du Châtel did not wait for this pretext to deliver an axe blow to the Duke's face, crying "Kill, kill!" There was then a scramble, according to a narrative given afterwards by Jean Séguinat, the Duke's secretary, to the commission of inquiry appointed by the Burgundians. Men-at-arms rushed into the enclosure through the door on the Dauphin's side, which had been kept open. The Duke was stabbed repeatedly, while the Dauphin, at a distance, remained impassive. Only three of the Duke's bodyguard had time to react; Archambaud de Foix, Lord of Navailles was killed trying to defend the Duke.

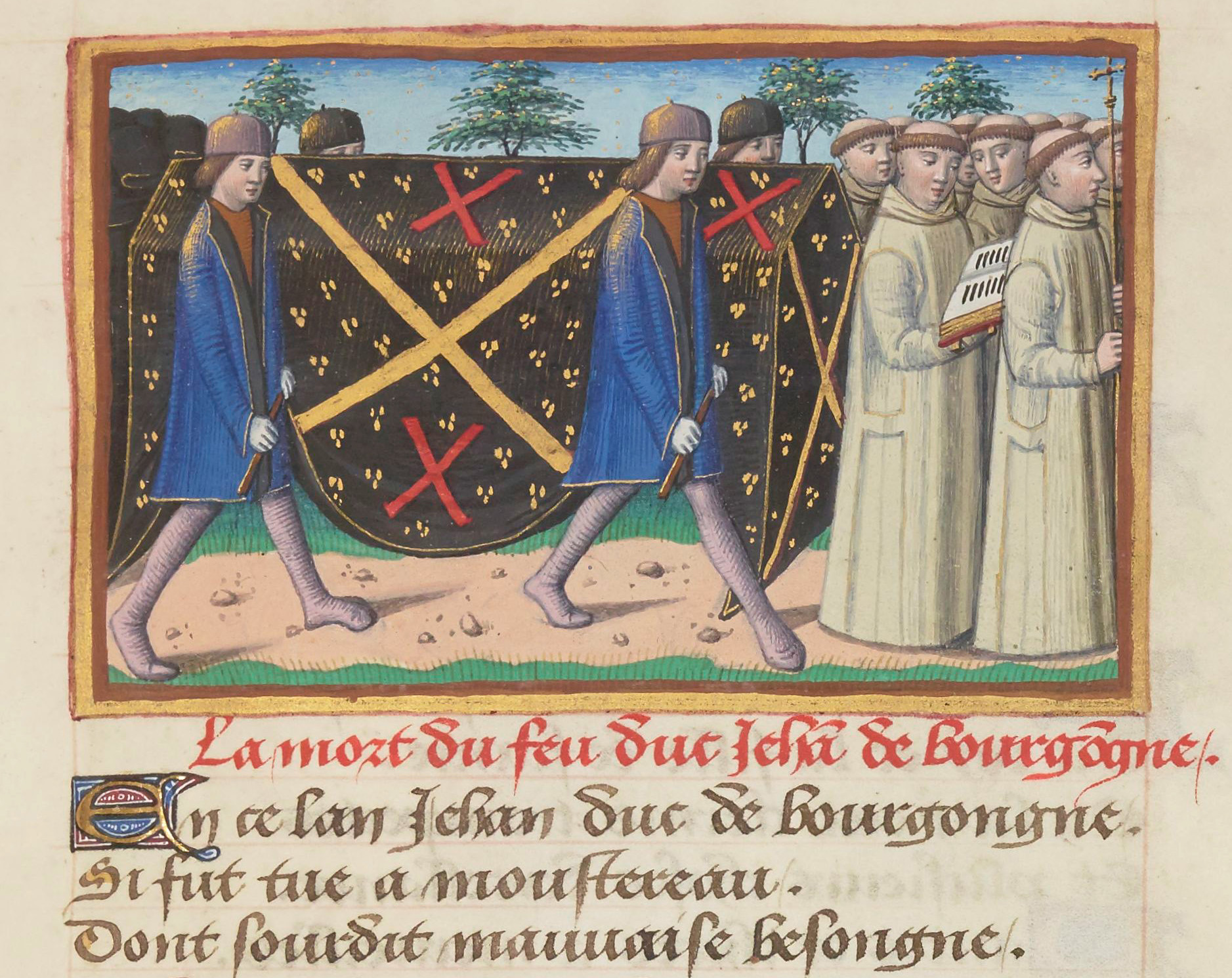
Funeral of John the Fearless

According to some accounts, the corpse of the Duke of Burgundy had the right hand cut off as the Duke himself had done twelve years earlier to his cousin, the Dauphin's uncle Louis I of Orléans. The Dauphin was pointed out as the principal instigator of the assassination of the Duke of Burgundy. Despite his denials and excuses, he could not clear his name, and was disinherited by his parents.

== Consequences ==
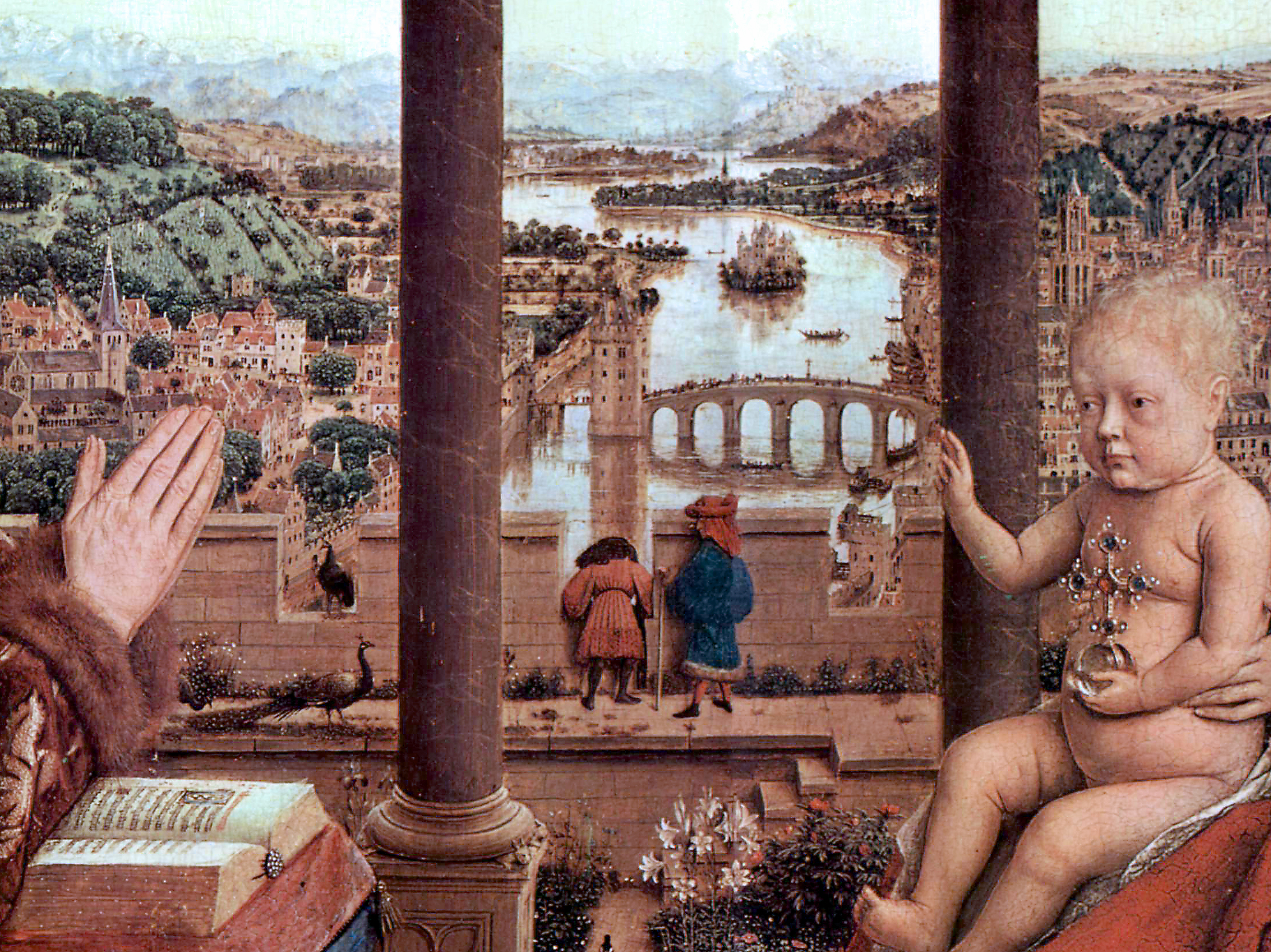
Madonna of Chancellor Rolin by Jan van Eyck, dating from around 1435 (detail). A bridge in the painting has been suggested to have been the location of the assassination. The Treaty of Arras, concluded by Nicolas Rolin, (sitter of painting) on 21 September 1435, contained a decree to the effect that a cross in memory of the assassination be erected on the bridge. The years between the murder and the recently concluded Treaty can be read in the number of floor-tiles between the arcade and the picture-plane.

This act would have catastrophic consequences for France, already greatly weakened by struggles for power and the French defeat at Agincourt in 1415. The new Duke of Burgundy and John's son, Philip the Good, made an alliance with the English; John the Fearless had always avoided this, though he had observed a benevolent neutrality towards them and promptly benefited from their aid, e.g., in order to gain power in Paris. This led to the Treaty of Troyes a year later in 1420, which gave the successor of the crown of France temporarily to King Henry V of England. The Armagnacs contested this treaty, but at the time controlled only the south-east of the country.

== John's skull seen by Francis I ==
Sometime after the assassination, a Carthusian monk recovered the skull of John the Fearless. Then, In 1521, during a visit by King Francis I of France to the Burgundian capital, a monk presented the skull to the King of France, saying to him, "Sire, this is the hole through which the English entered France."

== Bibliography ==
- Françoise Autrand Charles VI , Fayard, 1986.
- Paul Bonenfant, Du meurtre de Montereau au traité de Troyes, Coll. Mémoires de la classe des Lettres et Sciences morales et politiques, tome LII, fasc. 4, Bruxelles, Académie Royale de Belgique, 1958.

== Sources ==
- Le Meurtre de Jean Sans Peur sur le pont de Monterau (Chronicles of Enguerrand de Monstrelet, 15th century, Bibliothèque de l'Arsenal, Paris)
- Philippe de Commines The assassination of John the Fearless (15th century)
