= Treaty of Pouilly-le-Fort =

1419 treaty between John the Fearless, Duke of Burgundy, and the Dauphin Charles

- Signed: 11 July 1419
- Location: Pouilly-le-Fort
- Signatories: Dauphin Charles; John the Fearless
- Parties: Kingdom of France; Duchy of Burgundy

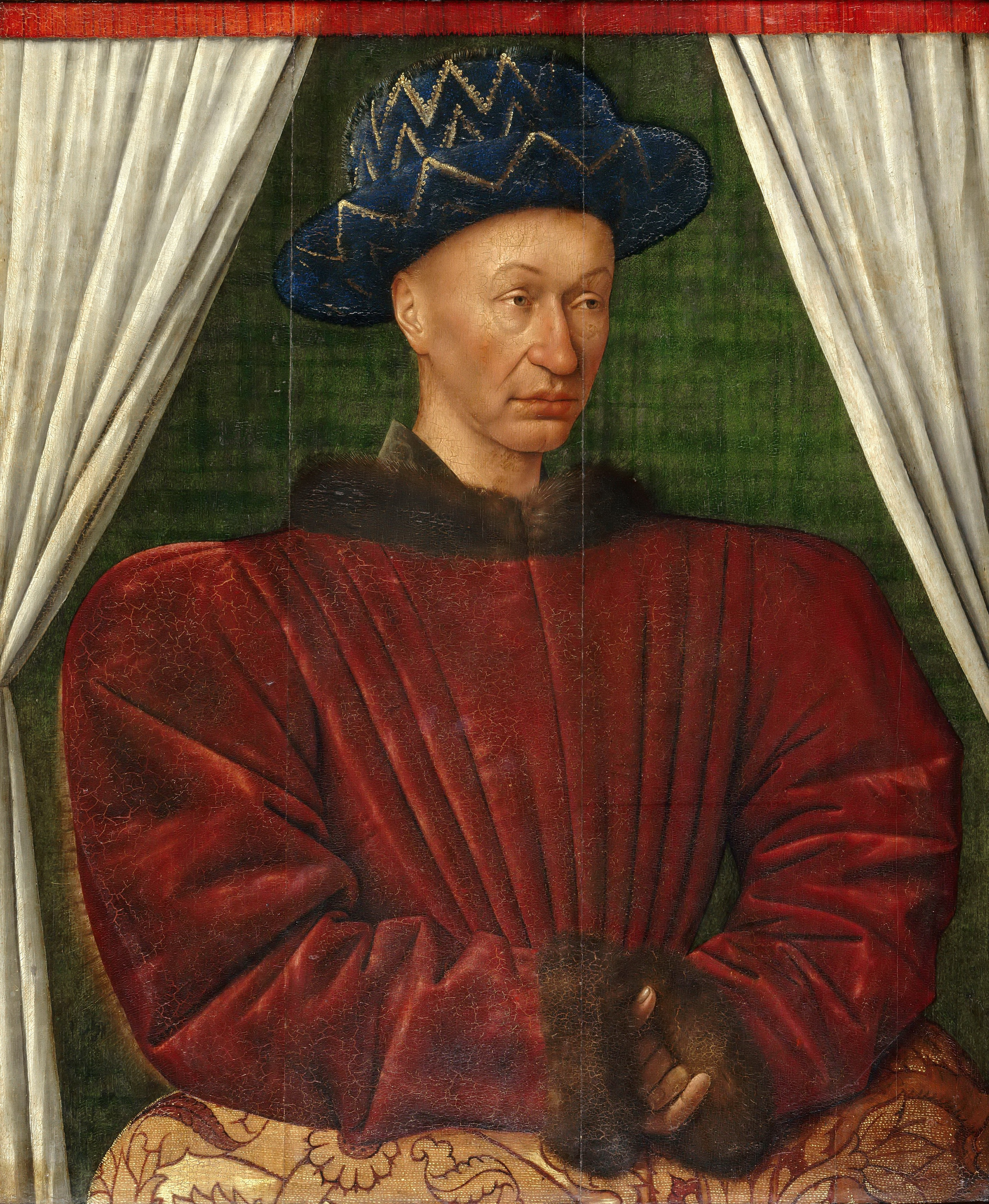
The Dauphin, Charles. Portrait as Charles VII of France, c. 1445–1450. Louvre Museum.

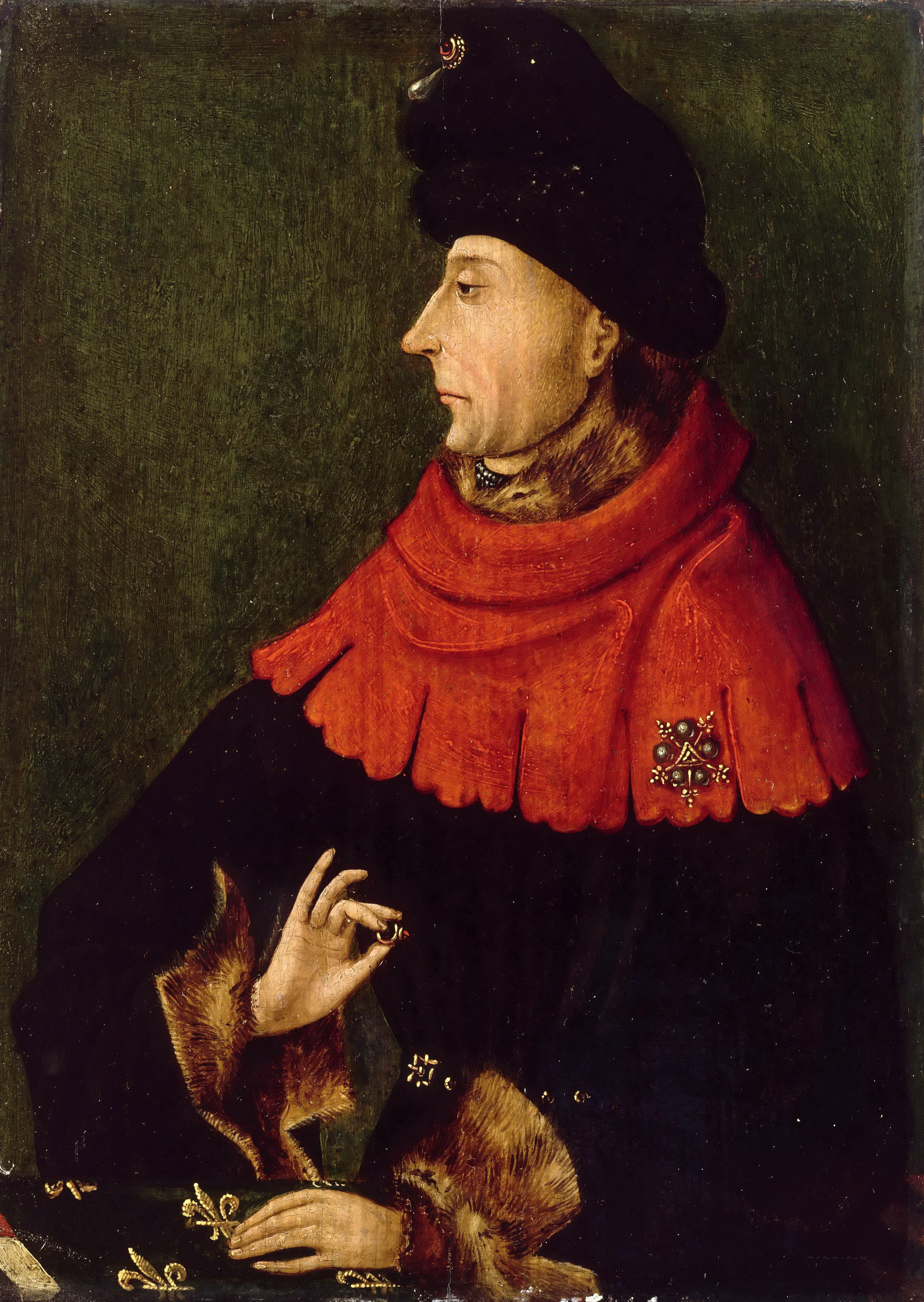
John the Fearless, Duke of Burgundy, c. 1404-1405. Louvre Museum.

The Treaty of Pouilly-le-Fort, also called the Treaty of Pouilly and the Peace of Ponceau was signed on 11 July 1419 by John the Fearless (French: Jean sans Peur), Duke of Burgundy, and the sixteen-year old Dauphin, Charles (the future Charles VII of France).

== Background ==
In 1407, during a lull in the Hundred Years' War against the English, civil war had broken out between two cadet branches of the French royal family – the House of Orléans (Armagnac faction) and the House of Burgundy (Burgundian faction).

John the Fearless, Duke of Burgundy, captured Paris in 1418, and made himself protector of the King, Charles VI of France. He entered into negotiations with the English in which he seemed willing to welcome the king of England's claim on the French throne. It became imperative for the Dauphin to negotiate a rapprochement with the Burgundians to avoid an Anglo-Burgundian alliance. John the Fearless, on his part, had become master of a large part of the kingdom after his capture of Paris, but his finances were at rock bottom. John was thus in favour of meeting the Dauphin in order to sign up to an advantageous peace, so several meetings were organised.

== The treaty ==
John the Fearless and the Dauphin met at Pouilly-le-Fort, a castle located between Melun and Corbeil, initially on 8 July 1419, but were unable to agree. They met again on 11 July and, after initial differences, the Duke and the Dauphin came to an agreement, accompanied by a sworn and signed treaty. In the treaty, the Duke and Dauphin swore peace and loyalty to each other, to help and defend each other against the English, and to work towards the “repulsion” of the English. Their oaths were taken on the Bible, held by the bishop of Léon.

After the agreement, "…the lords of the two retinues raised their hands to the sky. Soon, they mingled with each other and forgetting all resentment, they hugged each other like brothers. After signing the treaty, the two princes stretched out their hands, and swore, having giving each other the kiss of peace, to remain closely united, and made great demonstrations of friendship."

When news of the treaty reached Paris, it was greeted with universal joy: bonfires were lit, bells were rung, and Te Deums were sung in the churches.

== Subsequent events ==
On the grounds that peace was not sufficiently assured by the meeting at Pouilly, a fresh interview was proposed by the Dauphin to take place on 10 September 1419 on the bridge at Montereau, in order to build a strategy that would allow them to fight against the English.

However, at the meeting, Charles's men accused the Burgundians of not keeping their promise to break off their alliances with the English. John the Fearless was killed, felled with an axe by Tanneguy du Chastel, one of the Dauphin’s companions, and done to death by the other members of the Dauphin’s escort. Contemporary evidence shows this was a political assassination, and almost certainly carefully premeditated.

Following this event, Jean's son and successor Philip the Good formed an alliance with the English, which would prolong the Hundred Years' War for decades and cause incalculable damage to France and its subjects.

== Sources ==
- du Fresne de Beaucourt, Gaston (1881). Histoire de Charles VII (in French). Vol. I: Le dauphin, 1403–1422. Paris: Librairie de la société bibliographique. pp. 143–153. Archived from the original on 24 December 2023.
- Vaughan, R. (1998). "John, Duke of Burgundy". Encyclopædia Britannica.

== See also ==
- Hundred Years' War
- Charles VII of France
- John the Fearless
- Assassination of John the Fearless
- Armagnac–Burgundian Civil War
