= John the Fearless =

Duke of Burgundy from 1404 to 1419

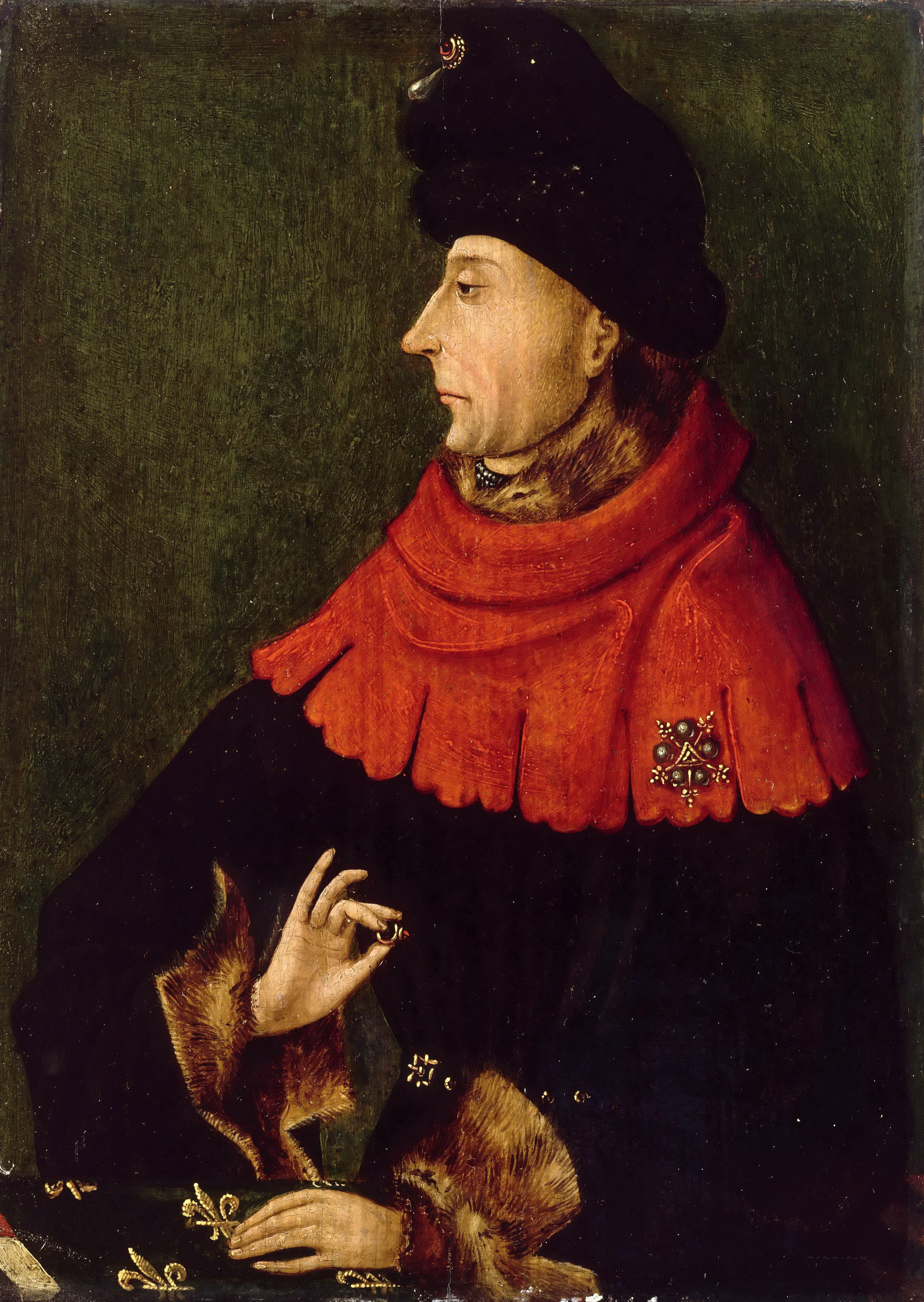
- Anonymous portrait, c. 1405

Duke of Burgundy
- Reign: 27 April 1404 – 10 September 1419
- Predecessor: Philip II
- Successor: Philip III
- Born: 28 May 1371; Ducal palace, Dijon, Burgundy
- Died: 10 September 1419 (aged 48); Montereau, Kingdom of France
- Burial: Champmol, Dijon
- Spouse: Margaret of Bavaria (m. 1385)
- Issue more...: Margaret, Dauphine of France; Mary, Duchess of Cleves; Philip III, Duke of Burgundy; Anne, Duchess of Bedford; Agnes, Duchess of Bourbon
- House: Valois-Burgundy
- Father: Philip the Bold
- Mother: Margaret III, Countess of Flanders

John I, called the Fearless (French: Jean sans Peur ; Dutch: Jan zonder Vrees; 28 May 1371 – 10 September 1419), was a scion of the French royal family who ruled the Burgundian State as the Duke of Burgundy from 1404 until his assassination in 1419. He played a key role in French national affairs during the early 15th century, particularly in his struggle to remove the mentally ill King Charles VI and during the Hundred Years' War against the Kingdom of England. A rash, ruthless and unscrupulous politician, John murdered Charles's brother, the Duke of Orléans, in an attempt to gain control of the government, which led to the eruption of the Armagnac–Burgundian Civil War in the Kingdom of France and in turn culminated in his own assassination in 1419.

The involvement of Dauphin Charles, the heir to the French throne, in his assassination prompted John's son and successor Philip III the Good to seek an alliance with the English, thereby bringing the Hundred Years' War to its final phase.

John, like his father Philip the Bold before him, played an important role in the development of gunpowder artillery in European warfare, making extensive and successful use of it in his military campaigns.

== Early life ==
John was born at the Palace of the Dukes of Burgundy in Dijon on 28 May 1371 to Philip the Bold, Duke of Burgundy and Margaret III, Countess of Flanders. His paternal grandfather was King John II of France, making John a prince du sang ("prince of the blood"). On the death of his maternal grandfather Count Louis II of Flanders in 1384, he received the County of Nevers.

In 1385, a double wedding for the Valois-Burgundian family took place in Cambrai. John married Margaret of Bavaria, daughter of Count of Holland and Duke of Bavaria Albert I, while at the same time his sister Margaret of Burgundy married Albert's son William in order to consolidate John's position in the Low Countries. The marriage took place after John cancelled his engagement to his first cousin, Catherine, a daughter of King Charles V of France, who was only a child at the time.

Before his accession to become the Duke of Burgundy, John was one of the principal leaders of the French forces sent to aid Sigismund, King of Hungary in his crusade against Sultan Bayezid I of the Ottoman Empire. John led the French forces fought in the Battle of Nicopolis of 25 September 1396 against the Ottomans with such enthusiasm and bravery that he was given the cognomen Fearless (Sans-Peur). Despite his personal bravery, his impetuous leadership ended in disaster for the European expedition. He was captured and did not recover his liberty until the next year after an enormous ransom was paid.

== Conflict with Orléans ==
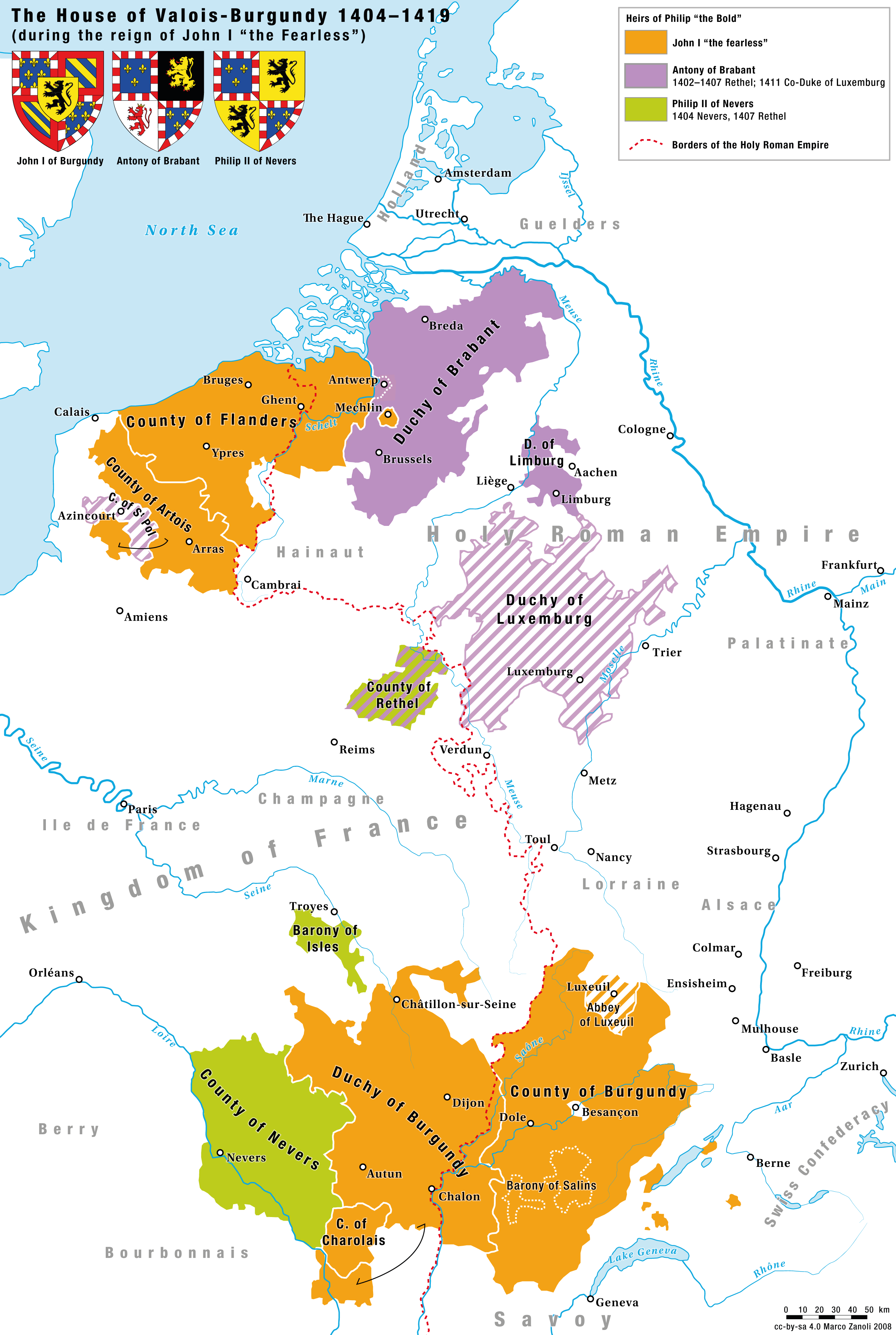
Map of the territories held by the House of Valois-Burgundy 1404–1419 during the reign of John I “the Fearless”

John inherited the Duchy of Burgundy on 27 April 1404 upon the death of his father, Philip the Bold and the counties of Burgundy, Flanders and Artois on his mother's death on 16 March 1405. He almost immediately entered into open conflict with Louis I, Duke of Orléans, the younger brother of the increasingly disturbed King Charles VI of France. Both men attempted to fill the power vacuum left by the demented king.

John played a game of marriages by exchanging his daughter Margaret of Burgundy for Michelle of Valois, who would marry his heir, Philip the Good, Count of Charolais. For her part, Margaret was married to Dauphin Louis, Duke of Guyenne, the heir to the French throne from 1401 until his death in 1415. For all his concentration on aristocratic politics, John nonetheless did not overlook the importance of the middle class of merchants and tradesmen or the University of Paris.

Louis I, Duke of Orléans tried to gain the favour of the wife of Charles VI, Queen Isabeau, and may have become her lover. After his son-in-law, the Dauphin Louis, was successively kidnapped and recovered by both parties, the Duke of Burgundy managed to gain appointment by royal decree—during one of the king's "absent" periods when mental illness manifested itself—as guardian of the Dauphin and the king's children. This did not improve relations between John and the Duke of Orléans. Soon the two rivals descended into making open threats. Their uncle, John, Duke of Berry, secured a vow of solemn reconciliation on 20 November 1407, but only three days later, on 23 November 1407, Louis was brutally assassinated in the streets of Paris. The order, no one doubted, had come from the Duke of Burgundy, who shortly admitted to the deed and declared it to be a justifiable act of "tyrannicide". According to Thomas Walsingham, Orléans had simply received his just desserts as he had been "taking his pleasure with whores, harlots, incest" and had committed adultery with the wife of an unnamed knight who had taken his revenge by killing him under the protection of the Duke of Burgundy. After an escape from Paris and a few skirmishes against the Orléans party, John managed to recover the king's favour. In the treaty of Chartres, signed on 9 March 1409, the king absolved the Duke of Burgundy of the crime, and he and Louis' son Charles pledged a reconciliation. A later edict renewed John's guardianship of the Dauphin.

He moved further closer to securing the Regency for himself when he had Jean de Montagu, Grand Master of France and the king's long standing favorite and administrator aligned with the Orléanists, arrested during another one of Charles' manic episodes, and after an expedited summary trial carried out by the Burgundian-aligned politicians, Montagu was beheaded at the Gibbet of Montfaucon on 17 October 1409.

Even with the Orléans dispute resolved in his favour, John did not lead a tranquil life. Charles, the son and heir of the murdered Duke of Orléans, was only 14 at the time of his father's death and was forced to depend heavily on allies to support his claims for the property that had been confiscated from him by the Duke of Burgundy. Chief among these allies was his father-in-law Bernard VII, Count of Armagnac. Because of this alliance, their faction became known as the Armagnacs in opposition to the Burgundians. With peace between the factions solemnly sworn in 1410, John returned to Burgundy and Bernard remained in Paris, where he reportedly shared the Queen's bed. The Armagnac party was not content with its level of political power, and after a series of riots and attacks against the citizens, John was recalled to the capital, then sent back to Burgundy in 1413. At this time, King Henry V of England invaded French territory and threatened to attack Paris. During the peace negotiations with the Armagnacs, Henry was also in contact with John, who was keen to wrest control of France away from King Charles VI. Despite this, he continued to be wary of forming an alliance with the English for fear of destroying his immense popularity with the common people of France. When Henry demanded Burgundy's support for his claim to be the rightful King of France, John backed away and decided to ally himself with the Armagnacs. Although he talked of helping his sovereign, his troops took no part in the Battle of Agincourt in 1415, although two of his brothers, Anthony, Duke of Brabant, and Philip II, Count of Nevers, died fighting for France during the battle.

== Conflict with the Dauphin ==
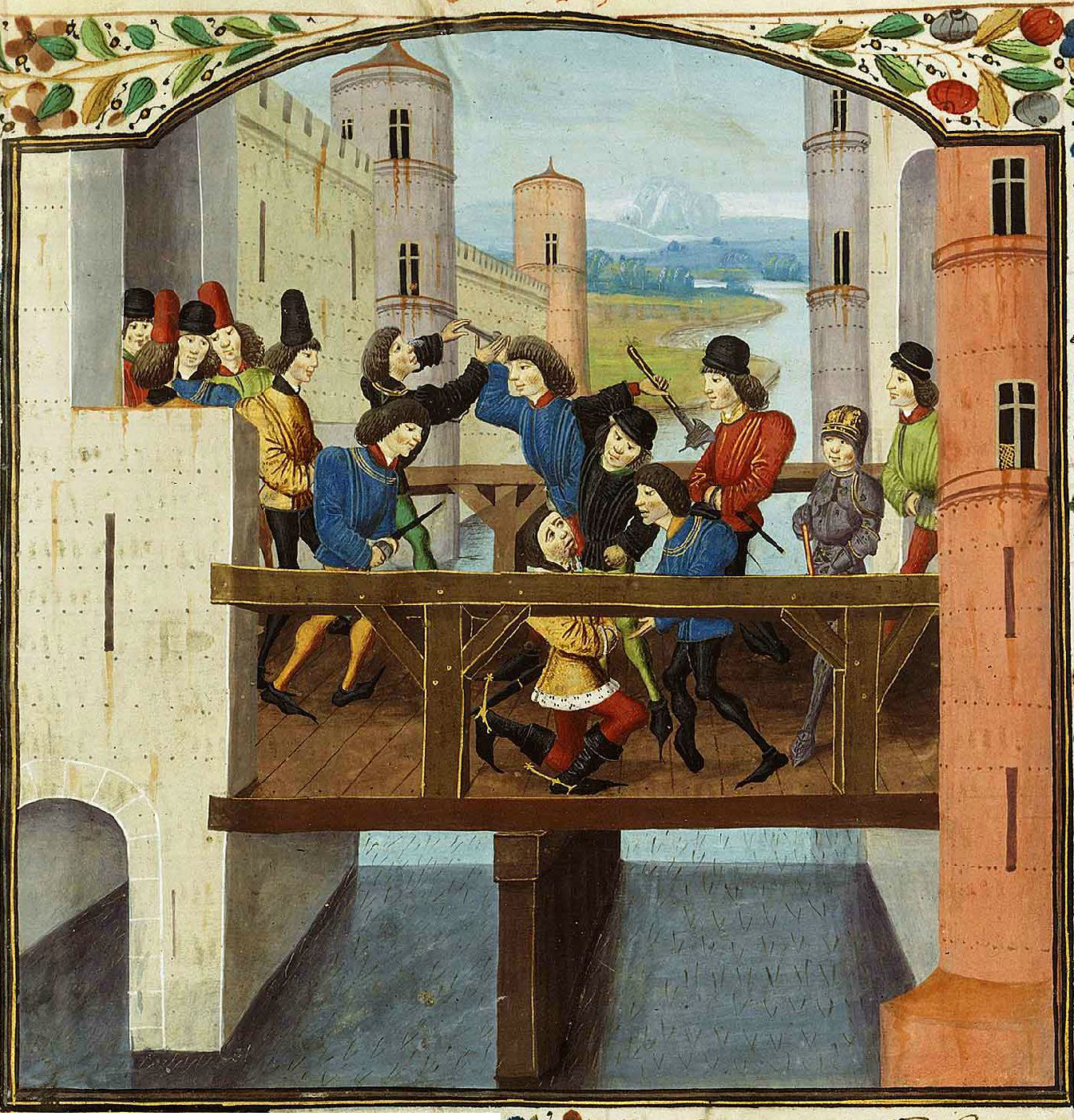
Assassination of John the Fearless on the Bridge of Montereau in 1419; detail from a 1470s miniature

Two years later, with the rivalry between Burgundians and Armagnacs at an all-time high because of the shattering defeat at Agincourt, John's troops set about the task of capturing Paris. On 30 May 1418, he captured the city, but not before the new Dauphin, the future King Charles VII of France, had escaped and sought shelter at the Bastille. John then installed himself in Paris and made himself protector of the king. Although not an open ally of the English, John did nothing to prevent the surrender of Rouen in 1419. With the whole of northern France in English hands and Paris occupied by Burgundy, the Dauphin tried to bring about a reconciliation with John. They met in July and swore peace on the bridge of Pouilly-le-Fort, near Melun. On the grounds that peace was not sufficiently assured by the meeting at Pouilly, a fresh interview was proposed by the Dauphin to take place on 10 September 1419 on the bridge at Montereau. John of Burgundy was present with his escort for what he considered a diplomatic meeting. He was, however, assassinated by the Dauphin's bodyguards, including Tanneguy III du Châtel and Jean Louvet. He was later solemnly buried in Dijon in 1420 after the Anglo-Burgundian forces occupied Montereau. Following this, his son and successor Philip the Good formed an alliance with the English, which would prolong the Hundred Years' War for decades and cause large scale damage to France and its subjects.

== Family ==
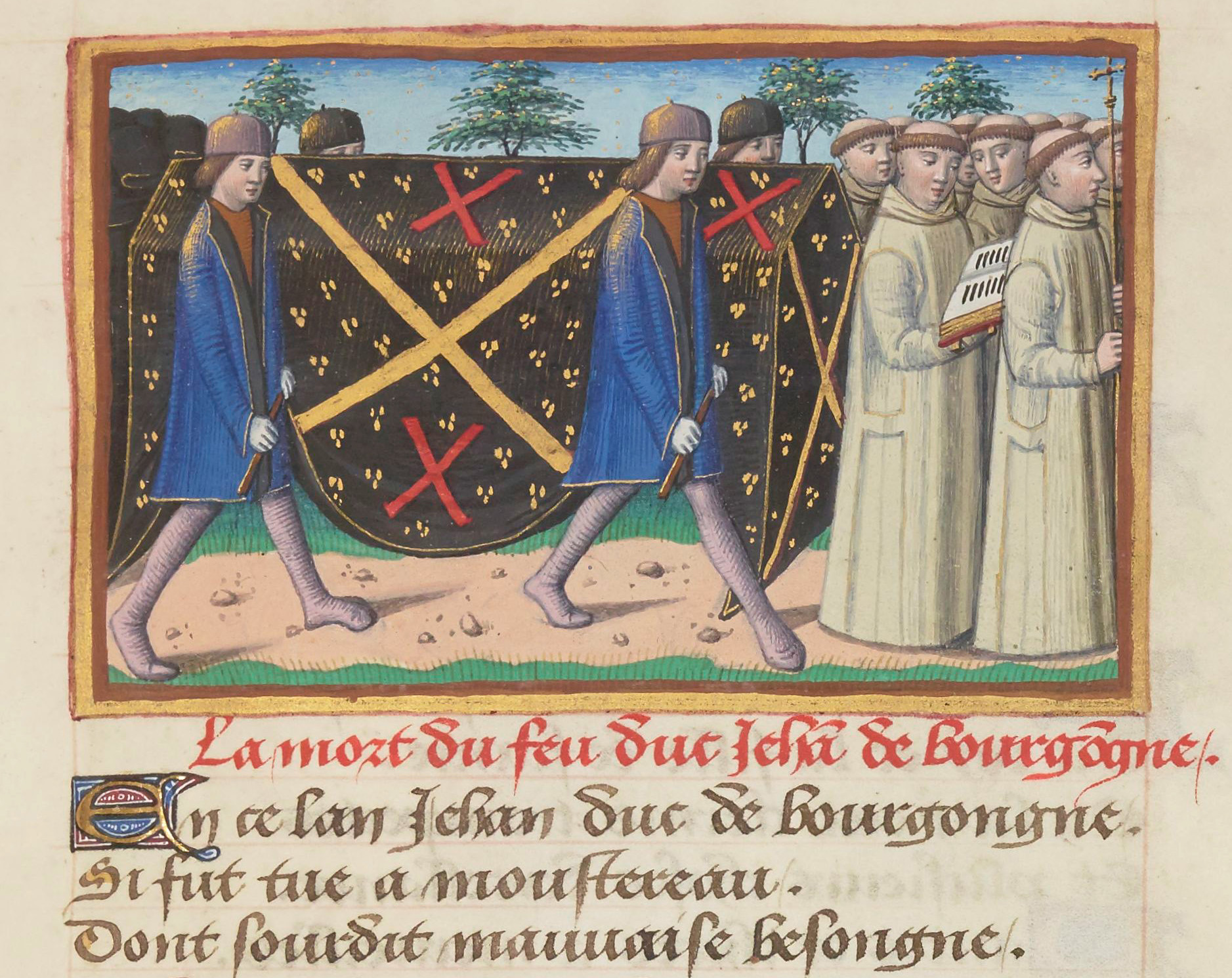
His funeral

John and his wife Margaret, who were married in 1385, had:

1. Marie (1393–1463, Monterberg bei Kalkar); married Adolph I, Duke of Cleves
2. Margaret (1393–1442, Paris); married on 30 August 1404 Dauphin Louis, Duke of Guyenne (heir of king Charles VI of France); then in 1423 Arthur, Count of Richmond, the future Duke of Brittany
3. Philip ΙΙΙ (1396–1467), son and heir. Duke of Burgundy, succeeding John from 1419 to 1467.
4. Catherine (1399–1414, Ghent); promised in 1410 to Louis III, Duke of Anjou, son of Louis II, Duke of Anjou
5. Joanna (1399–1406), died young
6. Isabelle (1400–1412, Rouvres); married at Arras on 22 July 1406 Olivier de Châtillon-Blois, Count of Penthièvre and Périgord
7. Anne (1404–1432, Paris); married John, Duke of Bedford
8. Agnes (1407–1476, Château de Moulins); married Charles I, Duke of Bourbon

John and his mistress Agnes de Croy, daughter of Jean I de Croÿ, had:

- John of Burgundy, Bishop of Cambrai

John and his mistress Marguerite de Borsele had:

- Guy of Burgundy, Lord of Kruibeke (killed at the siege of Calais in 1436); married Johanna, illegitimate daughter of Albert I, Duke of Bavaria
- Antoine of Burgundy
- Philipotte of Burgundy, Lady of Joncy; married Antoine of Rochebaron, Baron of Berze-le-Chatel

== Titles ==
- 1384–1404: Count of Nevers as John I
- 27 April 1404 – 10 September 1419: Duke of Burgundy as John I
- 21 March 1405 – 10 September 1419: Count Palatine of Burgundy as John I
- 21 March 1405 – 10 September 1419: Count of Artois as John I
- 21 March 1405 – 10 September 1419: Count of Flanders as John I
- 27 April 1404 – 28 January 1405: Count of Charolais as John I

== See also ==
- Duke of Burgundy

== Sources ==
- Smith, Robert Douglas & DeVries, K. (2005). The Artillery of the Dukes of Burgundy, 1363–1477. Woodbridge: Boydell Press. ISBN 978-1843831624.
- Lindquist, Sherry C.M. (2016). Agency, Visuality and Society at the Chartreuse de Champmol. Routledge. p. 72.
- Vaughan, R. (1998). "John, Duke of Burgundy". Encyclopædia Britannica.
- Vaughan, Richard (2005). John the Fearless. The Dukes of Burgundy. Vol. 2 (reprinted new ed.). Boydell Press. ISBN 978-0851159164.
- Kasten, Brigitte (2008). Herrscher- und Fürstentestamente im westeuropäischen Mittelalter. Böhlau Verlag Köln Weimar. p. 478.
- Kerrebrouck, Patrick van (1990). Nouvelle histoire généalogique de l'auguste maison de France. Les Valois. Vol. 3. Villeneuve-d'Arcy. p. 517.
- Library of Congress staff (16 December 2014) [2011]. "Library of Congress Name Authority File: Anne, of Burgundy, Duchess of Bedford, 1404?–1432".
- Sommé, Monique (1998). Isabelle de Portugal, duchesse de Bourgogne: une femme au pouvoir au XVe siècle. Presses Universitaires du Septentrion. p. 69. ISBN 978-2859395490.
- Ward, A.W.; Prothero, G.W.; Leathes, Stanley, eds. (1934). The Cambridge Modern History. Vol. XIII. Cambridge University Press.

John the Fearless House of Valois-Burgundy Cadet branch of the House of Valois Born: 28 May 1371 Died: 10 September 1419
Regnal titles
Preceded by Philip the Bold	Duke of Burgundy; 1404–1419	Succeeded by Philip the Good
Preceded by Philip the Bold	Count of Charolais; 1404–1405	Succeeded by Philip the Good
Preceded by Margaret III & II	Count of Artois, Flanders and Burgundy; 1405–1419	Succeeded by Philip the Good
Preceded by Margaret III & II	Count of Nevers; 1384–1404	Succeeded by Philip II
