= Assassination of Louis I, Duke of Orléans =

1407 murder in Paris, France

Coordinates: 48.859°N 2.359°E

Louis I, Duke of Orléans, was assassinated on 23 November 1407 in Paris, France. The assassination occurred during the power struggles between two factions attempting to control the regency of France during the reign of King Charles VI, who was seen as unfit to rule due to his mental illness. One faction was led by Louis, the king's younger brother, and Queen Isabeau of Bavaria, Charles' wife. They attempted to seize control of the country from the House of Valois-Burgundy after the death of the powerful Duke of Burgundy, Philip II the Bold, in 1404.

In the midst of these power struggles, Philip's successor, John the Fearless, dispatched a group of servants to murder the unpopular Louis. Following the murder, John openly bragged about it. Due to the assassination, the court conflict grew into open warfare, and ultimately in the assassination of John the Fearless himself twelve years later.

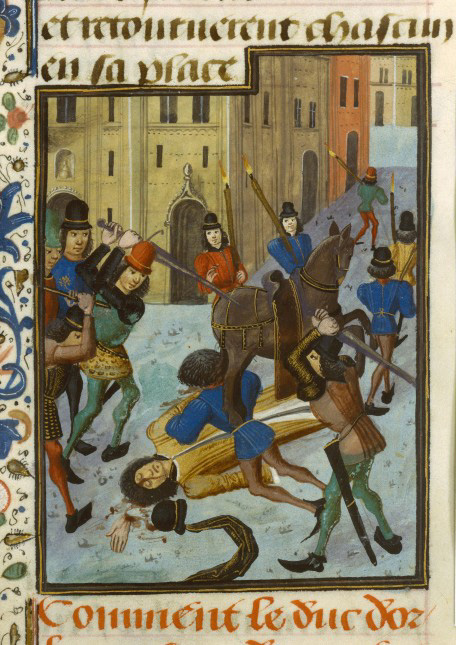
Assassination of the Duke of Orleans, showing the Duke's mutilated hand and his dead esquire.

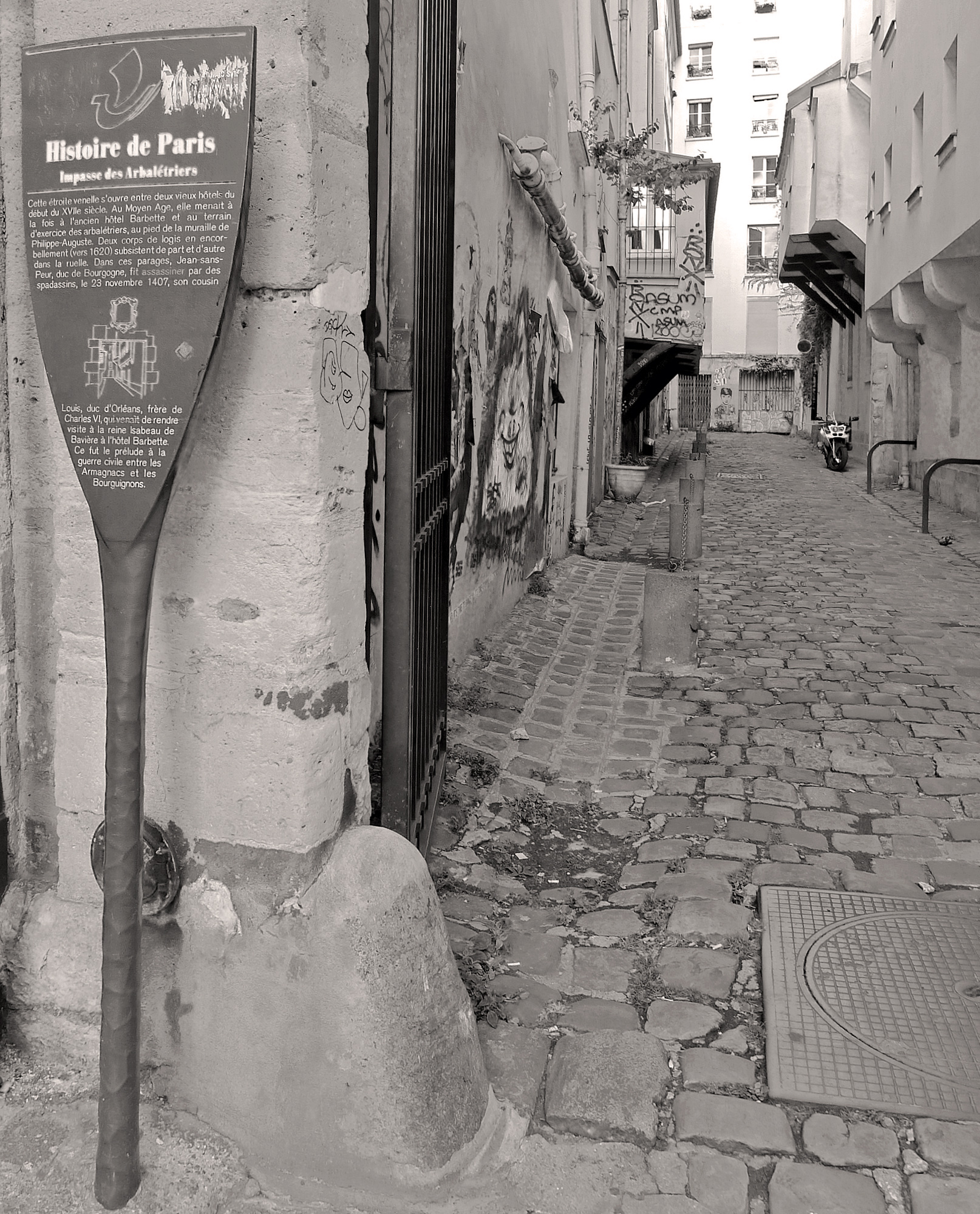
2014 photograph of the site in Paris of the assassination of the Duke of Orleans

== Background ==
During the reign of King Charles V, French generals like Bertrand du Guesclin steadily regained territory previously lost to the English in the Hundred Years' War. At the same time England was suffering from serious political disturbances and border threats at home. These two factors led to a truce being declared in 1389 in the Hundred Years' War.

Beginning in 1392, the King of France, Charles VI, experienced bouts of madness and often had to be confined. Whenever he was incapacitated, France was ruled by a regency council composed of the grandees of the kingdom presided over by Queen Isabeau. With the death of Philip II the Bold, Duke of Burgundy, political power shifted away from his son, John the Fearless, to the king's brother, Louis of Orléans, who was rumoured to have had a relationship with the queen. Louis had the Burgundians expelled from the council and took the lion's share of the royal treasury, which he used to break up the Duke of Burgundy's territorial possessions of Flanders and the Duchy of Burgundy by purchasing the Duchy of Luxembourg.

His authority thus weakened, John the Fearless decided he had to kill his rival.

== The murder ==
On 23 November 1407, the Duke of Orléans went to visit Queen Isabeau, who had given birth a little earlier, at the Hôtel Barbette on the Rue Vieille-du-Temple, in Paris.

Thomas de Courteheuse informed him that King Charles VI awaited his urgent presence at the Hôtel Saint-Paul.

Upon his departure, he was stabbed by about fifteen masked thugs led by Raoulet d'Anquetonville, who was a henchman of the Duke of Burgundy. The valets and guards that escorted him were unable to protect him. An esquire named Jacob was killed trying to protect the Duke. The Duke's hand was cut off and his skull split by an axe. The Duke of Burgundy had the support of the Parisian and University populations, which he had known how to win over by promising the establishment of an ordinance like that of 1357. Able to seize power, he could publicly confess to the assassination. Far from hiding it, John the Fearless had a eulogy of tyrannicide written by the theologian Jean Petit, an academic at the Sorbonne.

== Aftermath ==
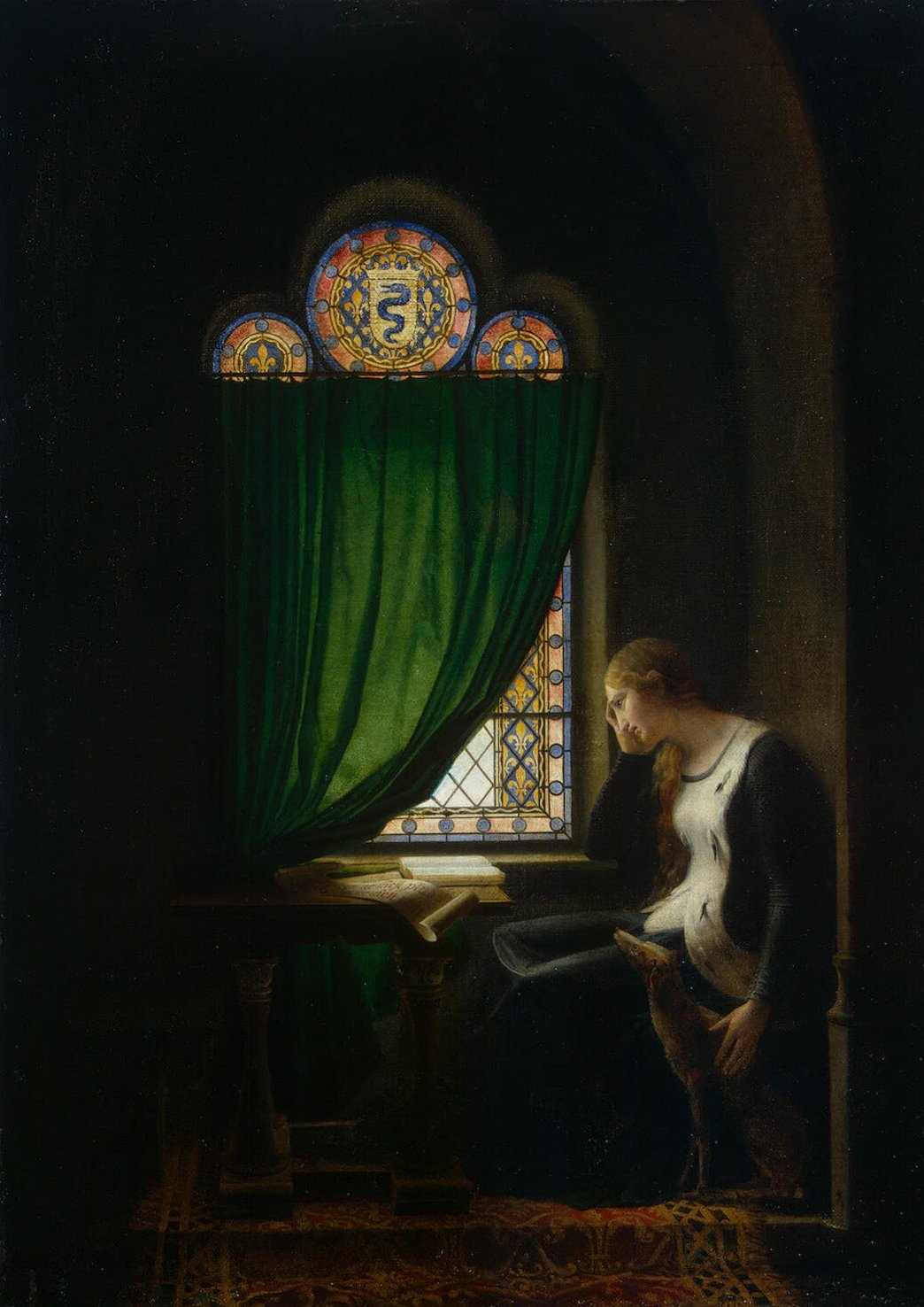
Valentine of Milan Mourning Her Husband the Duke of Orléans, an 1802 painting by Fleury François Richard depicting the widowed Duchess of Orléans.

In order to appease the combatants following the assassination, King Charles VI of France called the Duke of Burgundy and the children of the deceased to Chartres on 28 February 1409. He also charged Count William IV of Hainaut, the brother-in-law of John the Fearless, to ensure, at the head of 400 men-at-arms and 100 archers, the protection of each of the delegations during their trip and to fight on the side of the attacked party if hostilities were to occur.

On 15 April 1410, in Gien, during the nuptials of Charles I, Duke of Orléans, the son of the assassinated duke, and Bonne of Armagnac, the powerful men of the kingdom present joined forces against the Duke of Burgundy. The Armagnac–Burgundian Civil War that ensued went on for thirty years, until the signing of the Treaty of Arras. John the Fearless was himself assassinated by the Armagnacs in 1419, on the bridge at Montereau.
