= Jean Petit (theologian) =

French theologian and professor

Jean Petit (Jehan Petit, John Parvus) (b. most likely at Brachy, Caux, in Normandy, and certainly in the Diocese of Rouen, c. 1360 − 15 July 1411) was a French theologian and professor in the University of Paris. He is known for his public defence of a political killing as tyrannicide.

== Life ==
Some historians (César-Egasse du Boulay, Luke Wadding) say he was a Franciscan, others that he was a Dominican: as a matter of fact, he never was a member of any religious order. He owed his education to the generosity of the Duke of Burgundy, who granted him a pension. In the first extant document that records his name, he is called Master of Arts (16 August 1385). Two years later his name occurs in the list sent by the University of Paris (31 July 1387) to the Avignonian Antipope Clement VII, recommending its masters for vacant benefices.

He became a licentiate in theology in May 1400, and received the degree of Doctor before 1403, since he is mentioned in that year on the roll of the university as an active member of the theological faculty of Paris. In April 1407, he formed part of the embassy sent by Charles VI of France to urge the Avignonian Antipope Benedict XIII and Pope Gregory XII to abdicate and thus reunite Christendom. This embassy had just returned to Paris, after a fruitless journey, when an event took place that gave Jean Petit a great notoriety in history.

== Justification of political assassination ==
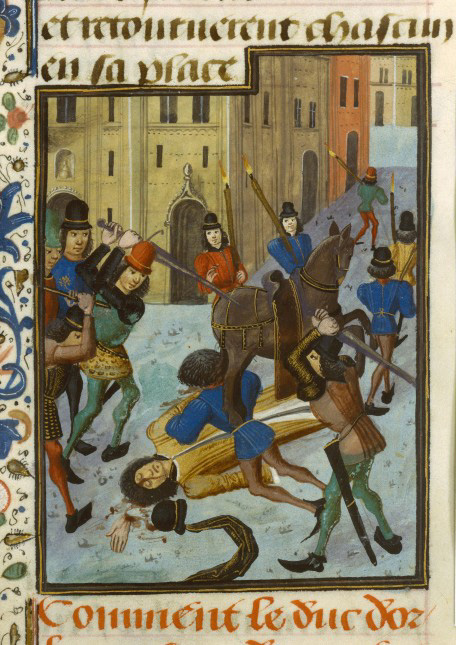
The assassination of the Duke of Orléans

On 23 November 1407, assassins in the pay of John the Fearless, Duke of Burgundy, murdered Louis I, Duke of Orléans, brother of the mentally ill king Charles VI. The unpopular Duke of Orléans was widely held responsible for public disorder and heavy, arbitrary taxation. The University of Paris bitterly opposed him for having renewed obedience to Avignon antipope Benedict XIII.

The Duke of Burgundy, on the contrary, was very popular, regarded as a friend of the commoners and an opponent of abusive taxation, while the university supported him in opposition to the Avignon antipope. Excluded from the royal council after the assassination, he withdrew to his estates in Flanders, raised an army, and called around him several of the university professors, including Jean Petit himself, who for three years had been attached to his suite and was receiving a pension from him. Thus supported, Jean Petit declared that he would go to Paris and justify himself. The royal council forbade him to enter Paris, but he came anyway and was received with popular acclaim. He demanded an audience with the king. It was granted on 8 March 1408, in the Hôtel de St-Paul, where the court habitually resided.

There, before the Dauphin, King of Sicily, Cardinal de Bar, Dukes of Anjou, Berry, Brittany, Bar, and Lorraine; the rector of the University of Paris, and many counts, barons, knights, and citizens, Jean Petit delivered on behalf of his client an address bristling with propositions, syllogisms, and biblical quotations. The 1913 Catholic Encyclopedia summarizes his argument as follows:

Whosoever is guilty of high treason and becomes a tyrant, deserves to be punished with death, all the more so when he is a near relative of the king; and in that case the natural, moral, and divine laws allow any subject whatever, without any command or public authorization, to kill him or to have him killed openly, or by stealth; and the more closely the author of the slaying is related to the king the more meritorious the act. Now, the Duke of Orléans — so ran the minor proposition — a slave to the passion of greed, the source of all evil, was guilty of high treason, and was a tyrant; which was proved by holding him guilty of all the pretended crimes which popular imagination and the partisans of the Duke of Burgundy laid to his charge. The conclusion was therefore that the Duke of Burgundy not only should not be punished or blamed for what had been done to the Duke of Orléans, but rather should be rewarded.

This thesis seemed preposterous to some members of the assembly; but the Duke of Burgundy was present with his troops, ready to suppress any attempt at reply, and further he was in the good graces of the university; so he had no difficulty in obtaining letters of pardon from the king.

As for Jean Petit, who in his address admitted that he was receiving, and expected still to receive, a pension from the Duke of Burgundy, he found it more prudent to withdraw from Paris and retire to the estate of the Duke of Burgundy at Hesdin, Artois, where he died in a house of his protector, regretting, it is said, that he had ever allowed himself to defend such a proposition.

=== Scholarly and theological responses ===
The interest it excited was not to die with him. As long as the Duke of Burgundy was all-powerful in Paris, the argument could not be attacked publicly, but when he was expelled, Jean Gerson, in a sermon delivered before the king, strongly denounced seven propositions of Jean Petit as heretical and scandalous (1413). Shortly afterwards the king asked Gerard de Montaigu, Bishop of Paris, and the inquisitor of France to examine them and to take whatever action they judged proper — without however mentioning the name of Jean Petit. The bishop and the inquisitor with sixty doctors went into what was called a "Council of the Faith." After several sittings the speech of Jean Petit and nine propositions, said to have been extracted from it, were condemned (23 February 1414) by decree of the Bishop of Paris and of the inquisitor, and the book containing them was publicly burnt three days later.

In the month of March following, the Duke of Burgundy appealed from the decision of the Bishop of Paris to Pisan Antipope John XXIII. The pontiff entrusted the investigation to three cardinals. On the other hand, Gerson and the ambassadors of the King of France brought the affair before the ecumenical Council of Constance. At this juncture, John XXIII left Constance (20 March 1415) and withdrew from the council, while the King of France and the Duke of Burgundy made peace by the Treaty of Arras (22 February 1415). Thereupon Charles VI ordered his representatives to take no action at the council against Jean Petit, provided the Duke of Burgundy would also let the matter rest.

Gerson broke the agreement by trying to obtain from the council a declaration that the writings of Jean Petit contained numerous errors in matters of faith. The Duke of Burgundy replied by a letter in which, while disavowing the general principles that formed the major proposition of the argument of Petit, he maintained that the propositions condemned by the Bishop of Paris were not contained in the discourse. Thereupon the three cardinals, entrusted with the duke's appeal, cited the Bishop of Paris to appear before them, and as he failed to do so, they reversed his decision, declaring at the same time that they did not intend thereby to approve of the propositions condemned by him, but only wished to do justice to the Duke of Burgundy, who had not been heard at the trial.

From that moment the trial of Jean Petit became the battleground of the ambassadors of France and of the Duke of Burgundy, and even of the Emperor Sigismund. The council had no intention of lending its authority to any political party, and in its fifteenth session, 6 July 1415, contented itself with a general condemnation of tyrannicide as upheld in the following proposition:

"A tyrant may be licitly and meritoriously, and rightly put to death by any vassal or subject, even by resorting to secret plots, adulation, and feigned friendship, notwithstanding any oath of fealty to him or treaty concluded with him, without any judicial decree or order."

But Jean Petit was not mentioned and the council avoided saying that any such proposition was contained in his address, and no further decision was pronounced by the council on the particular case. After securing the condemnation of Jean Petit in August 1416, King Charles VI two years later disavowed Gerson and his supporters (6 October 1418), and on 3 November 1418, he rehabilitated Jean Petit and annulled the sentences pronounced against him. The propositions attributed to him by his adversaries are not contained in his discourse, in the form in which it has reached us.

== Other works ==
Petit's career occurred at the time of the Western Schism. France sided with the Avignonian Antipope Clement VII, but every one was anxious for reunion. Petit gave expression to this desire in his Complainte de l'Eglise, a poem discovered in the National Library, Paris. This poem of 322 verses was composed in 1394. He had already written four others, the Disputation des pastourelles (1388), defending the Immaculate Conception; the Livre du champ d'or; the Livre du miracle de Basqueville (1389); and the Vie de Monsieur saint Léonard, about the same time. They offer an unflattering picture of the society of the day.
