= Jean Louvet (politician) =

15th century French politician

Jean Louvet (c. 1370 – c. 1440), called the president of Provence, occupied the position of président of the Chambre des Comptes at Aix in 1415. Towards the end of that year he went to Paris with Louis II, Duke of Anjou, attached himself to Dauphin Charles, and after having been chief steward of the household to Queen Isabeau he turned against her. He was one of the principal agents of the Armagnac party, and became the most influential adviser of Charles VII during the first years of his reign.

But his rapacity gained him enemies, and when the Constable Arthur, Count of Richmond, attained a preponderating influence over Charles VII, Louvet retired to his captaincy of Avignon. He still remained a personage of importance in his exile, and played an influential part even in his last years.
