= Armagnac (party) =

Medieval French political party

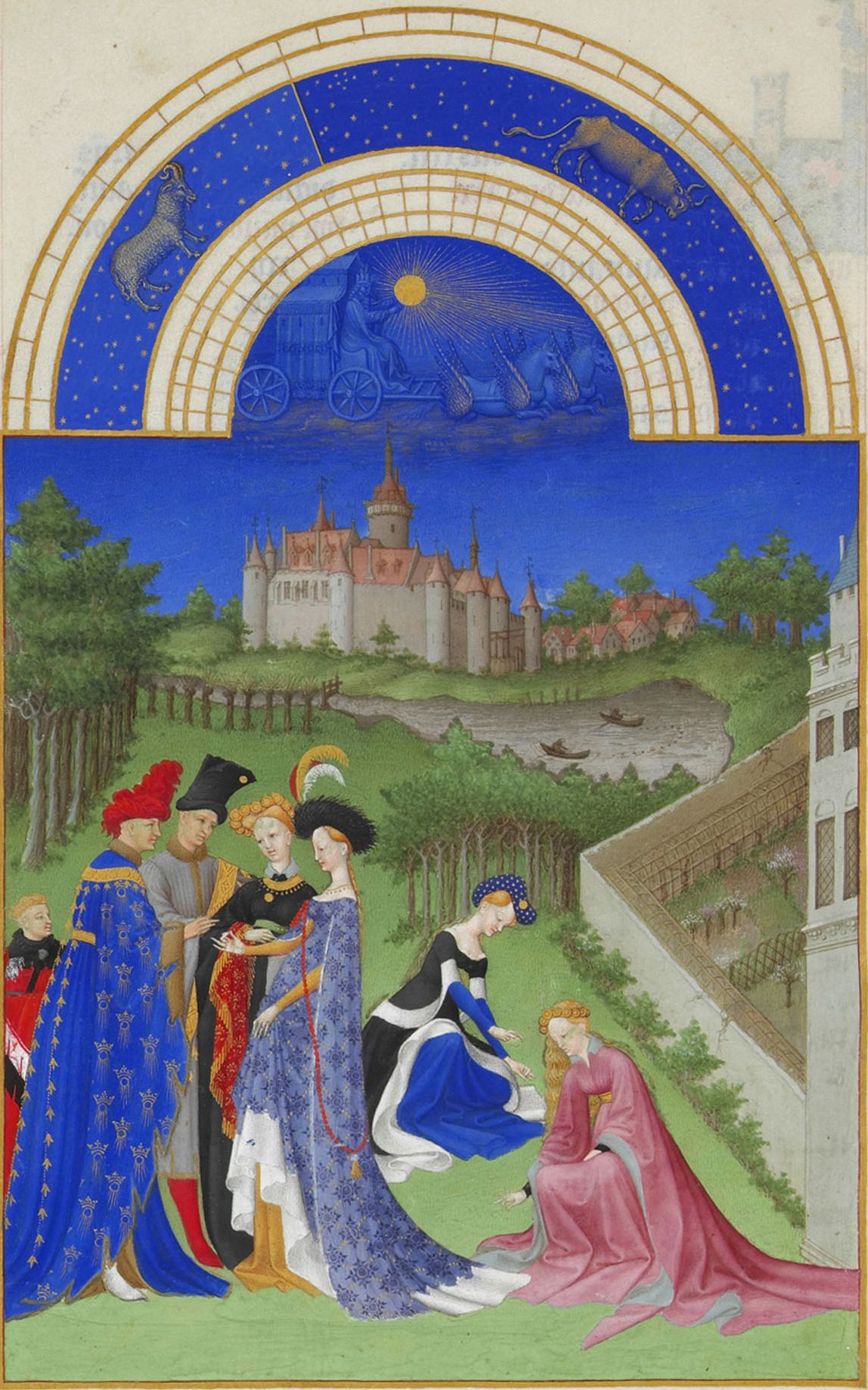
Marriage of Charles I, Duke of Orléans to Bonne of Armagnac at the Château de Dourdan - from the manuscript Très Riches Heures du Duc de Berry.

The Armagnac (US: /ˌɑːrmənˈjæk, ˌɑːrmɑːnˈjɑːk/, French: [aʁmaɲak]) faction was prominent in French politics and warfare during the Hundred Years' War. It was allied with the supporters of Charles I, Duke of Orléans against John the Fearless after Charles' father Louis of Orléans was killed on a Paris street on the orders of the Duke of Burgundy on 23 November 1407.

The Armagnac Faction took its name from Bernard VII, Count of Armagnac (1360–1418), Charles' father-in-law. He guided the teen-aged Charles and provided much of the financing and some of the seasoned Gascon troops that besieged Paris before their defeat at Saint-Cloud.

== Origins ==
In 1407, Louis I, Duke of Orléans was assassinated on the order of John the Fearless, Duke of Burgundy. Fearing Burgundian ambitions, the dukes of Berry, Brittany, and Orléans, and the counts of Alençon, Clermont, and Armagnac, formed a league against the Duke of Burgundy in 1410. Charles of Orléans, son of the murdered Louis, married Bonne of Armagnac, daughter of Bernard VII, count of Armagnac. In consequence, his father-in-law became the nominal head of the family. For that reason, Orléanist were called Armagnacs.

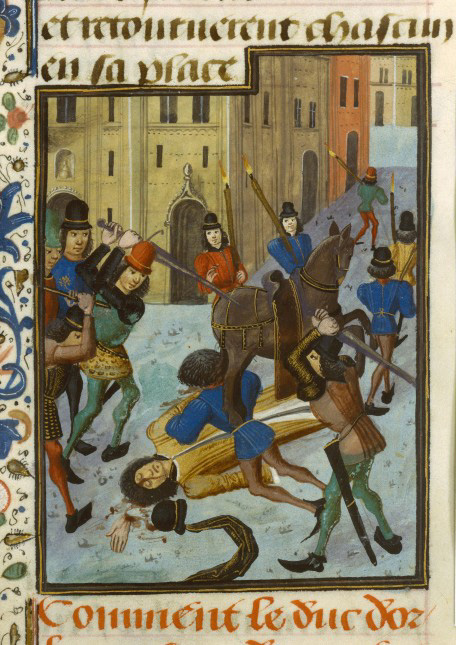
Assassination of Louis I, Duke of Orléans in 1407.

Parisian supporters of the nobles adopted the name "Armagnac" in the struggle for control of the city against the Burgundians. It was composed of two elements: the Orleanists and those following the Count who gradually infiltrated the noble opposition. Armagnac became an outspoken adherent of the Orleanist Faction in the Valois Court. His Gascon raiders hired to impose order on Paris wore their white shoulder sash. But Armagnac's brutal tactics made his administration very unpopular among Parisians. In February, the citizens asked the exiled John the Fearless to return to the capital. The following month he presented a long document known as The Justification of the Duke of Burgundy containing proof of the Armagnac schemes of intrigue. Orleans pleaded with the king, but Charles insisted on setting a meeting in Chartres for a reconciliation. Meanwhile, by the end of December 1409, Burgundians had filled all the offices of the city government.

The Armagnacs withdrew altogether from city politics to form the League of Gien. They were joined by disaffected Princes of the Blood: John, Duke of Berry, youngest brother of King Charles V; Louis II, Duke of Anjou; John I, Duke of Bourbon; John I, Duke of Alençon; John V, Duke of Brittany; Charles I d'Albret, Constable of France. These nobles formed the political and military elite of the Armagnac faction.

The Burgundians met them at the Peace of Bicetres, an attempted truce designed to iron out their differences. It largely failed because as the Armagnacs laid siege to Paris, a small English force landed at Calais to assist the Burgundian government. In October 1411, they marched towards Paris.

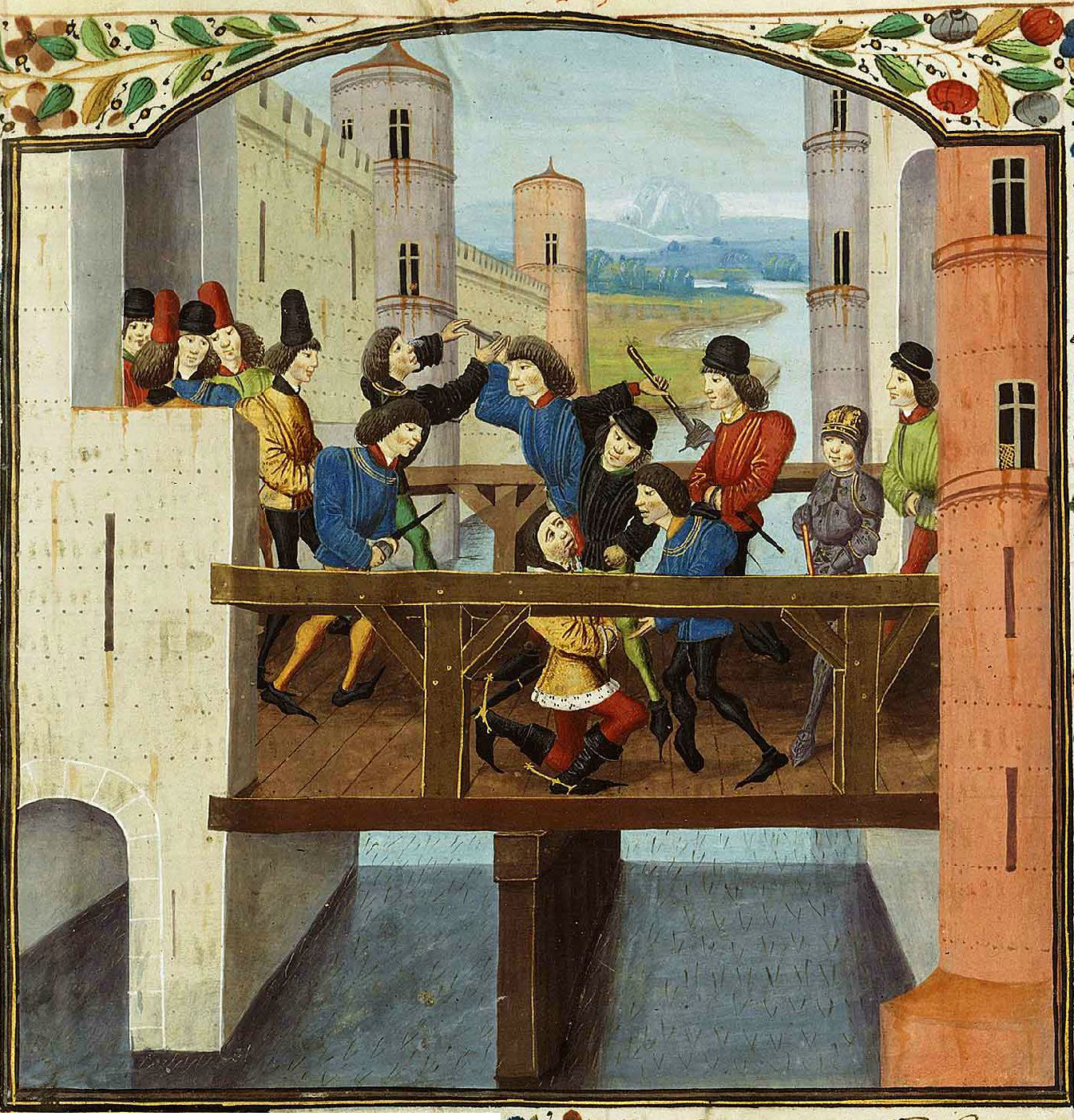
Assassination of John the Fearless, Duke of Burgundy in 1419. Details of a 1470s miniature.

Both parties in the Armagnac–Burgundian Civil War sought support from King Henry IV of England. In May 1412, the Armagnacs suffered a second reverse at the Treaty of Bourges. The Armagnacs offered Henry IV full sovereignty in Gascony in return for an army of 4,000 men. Thomas, Duke of Clarence, a fiery cavalry general, demanded considerable territorial concessions including Normandy in return for aid to Burgundy. Now desperate to save the honour of the Oriflamme, the Armagnacs resorted to seeking English arbitration in the internal dispute. At the Treaty of Buzancais, the English demanded a punitively large ransom from the Armagnacs. In a series of humiliating encounters, their leading general, Louis, Duke of Guyenne (then the Dauphin), was outmanoeuvred, defeated, and forced into the Treaty of Auxerre.

Later, John the Fearless was sent back to his lands, and Bernard VII of Armagnac remained in Paris and, some said, in the queen's bed. Burgundy gained control of Paris by a coup d'état in 1418, the Count of Armagnac was imprisoned and murdered by a Burgundian mob. In the same year, Henry V conquered Normandy. For both parties, it was clear that England was the main threat. There was an attempt at reconciliation between Armagnacs and Burgundians. However, in a meeting on the bridge at Montereau in September 1419, followers of the Dauphin Charles (who had succeeded in 1417) assassinated John the Fearless. As consequence, John's son Philip the Good allied with England as Henry V advanced without opposition to Paris.

The Armagnac faction, together with the Dauphin Charles, established a separate jurisdiction in central and southern France. Meanwhile, the Anglo-Burgundian alliance controlled the north, including Paris. Sporadic warfare continued between the Armagnacs and Burgundians for a number of years. As the Burgundians were allied with the English from 1419, and the Armagnacs supported the Dauphin, the factional rivalry became part of the larger dispute between the French and English monarchies.

The terms remained in use until they were outlawed by Charles VII toward the close of the Hundred Years' War, as part of efforts to heal the factional rift.

== See also ==
- Burgundian (party)
