= Siege of Saint-Denis (1435) =

Conflict in Hundred Years' War

- Part of the Hundred Years' War
Date	Late August – 4 October 1435
Location	Saint-Denis, France (close to Paris) 48°56′08″N 2°21′14″E
Result	English victory

Belligerents
Kingdom of England; Burgundian State	Kingdom of France

Commanders and leaders
John Talbot; Robert Willoughby; Thomas de Scales; Jean de Villiers	Pierre de Rieux (fr)

Strength
5,000	Over 1,500

Casualties and losses
At least 80	Unknown

The siege of Saint-Denis (Late August – 4 October 1435) was the last instance of cooperation between the English and their Burgundian allies in the Hundred Years' War. Saint-Denis, the traditional burial place of the kings of France, was located in the outskirts of English-held Paris, and had been captured by the French a couple of months earlier. The enemy presence there critically endangered the English position in the capital, and, aiming to retake it urgently, the English moved onto the town in August with a handful of Burgundian auxiliaries. The siege was undertaken during the peace congress of Arras, during which no end to the fighting was seen, as both sides struggled to gain ground around and over Paris. The English were victorious at St. Denis after the French garrison surrendered due to lack of external support.

On 21 September 1435, halfway through the siege, the Duke of Burgundy concluded the treaty of Arras with Charles VII of France. The agreement definitely severed the alliance between England and Burgundy. The Burgundians who were fighting alongside the English at Saint-Denis stayed until the end of the siege.

The English did not control Saint-Denis for long. By the time the town had been recovered, the French had taken Meulan, which blocked the main supply route from Paris to Normandy, further isolating the English forces in the French capital. The loss of the alliance with Burgundy crippled the English cause militarily, and following the reconciliation between the Armagnacs and Burgundians, military successes by a now-unified and strengthened French party led to the French capture of Saint-Denis in February 1436, followed by their recapture of Paris on 17 April 1436, further demonstrating their resurgence, and the English decline, in the conflict.

== Background ==
The town of Saint-Denis was important not only as a strategic outpost positioned in the very outskirts of Paris, but was also recognized by both sides in the conflict as a symbol of France, as it was the traditional burial place of French monarchs. Near it flows the Croult river, an affluent of the Seine. St. Denis had briefly fallen under French control in 1429, when Joan of Arc arrived, but was retaken soon after. The town and the surrounding region remained under English for the following years, but despite enjoying some military successes in the environs of the French capital during that period, their hold on the area remained tenuous, and the French continued ravaging the Île-de-France right up to the gates of Paris. In late 1434, England's ally Philip the Good, the Duke of Burgundy, began signing a series of truces with the Armagnacs, leaving the English on their own. Moreover, the English were increasingly lacking funds to continue the conflict. By 1435, the English military situation had declined considerably and the French increasingly gained ground in the surroundings of Paris.

On 9 May 1435, the French forces decisively defeated the English at the Battle of Gerberoy. The French did not fail to take advantage of the disrupted English defences, and on the early hours of 1 June, Armagnac troops led by the captains of nearby of Melun and Lagny seized Saint-Denis. Paris was now blockaded, making it difficult to supply the city by river or elsewhere. From their newly established position, the Armagnacs proceeded to afterwards harassed the surroundings of Paris, attacking and killing its inhabitants and ruining plantation fields around the city. The alarmed Parisians sent urgent deputations to John, Duke of Bedford, the English regent of France (then residing at Rouen), and to Louis of Luxembourg, the bishop of Thérouanne and chancellor of France for the English, for the dispatch of sufficient troops to defend the city from the nearby French.

The chancellor summoned 500 French soldiers from Picardy, a Burgundian contingent led by his cousin Jean, the bastard of Saint-Pol. The force was joyfully received in Paris, and, with the aid of Jean de Villiers de L'Isle-Adam, the governor of Paris for the English, commenced to wage war on the nearby Armagnacs. The latter did not relent in face of the resistance and attacked the castle of Orville near Louvres, which belonged to a Burgundian knight. In the meantime, reinforcements were being gathered in England. The English lords Talbot and Willoughby raised a force of 2,500 men and arrived at France in late July 1435. They were joined in France by Lord Scales, who supplied an army of 728 archers and about 50 infantrymen. They joined L'Isle-Adam in Paris, but they had to be redirected to relieve Orville before marching onto St. Denis, leaving the French garrisoned there to freely enjoy its possession, as well as the freedom to roam the environs of Paris, until the siege was finally laid in the last week of August.

In early August, the peace congress of Arras was officially convened with delegations from the Armagnacs, Burgundians, and the English. This did nothing to stop the fighting, as the French and English fought fiercely to gain ground over and near Paris, held only narrowly by the English. Even with peace being discussed, the war around the French capital continued; the Anglo-Burgundian army successfully relieved Orville, and moved to reduce the rest of the area to their obedience. They conducted many successful operations around Paris, recovering many castles and minor strongholds previously taken by the French. In the last week of August, St. Denis was finally invested.

== The siege ==
The besieging Anglo-Burgundian army numbered about 5,000 men, and was led by lords Talbot, Willoughby, Scales, and of L'Isle-Adam. The French garrison, which numbered at least 1,500, was led by marshal Pierre de Rieux. Upon noting the approach of the English, the garrison took their measures to defend the town, remaining alert day and night to be always ready to mount the defence. During the siege, the English were frequently visited by the chancellor Louis of Luxembourg, who urged the besiegers to finish the affair quickly.

The Anglo-Burgundian army carried out their attacks with the same vigor and diligence they had displayed until then throughout the Hundred Years' War. Their cannons caused great damage to the town walls, prompting them to mount a series simultaneous attacks in order to take the place by storm. They gathered a force of 600 men for this purpose. The assault was mounted on 9 September, the day after the Nativity of Mary. Bringing scaling ladders and other instruments of war, the English and Burgundians crossed the moat between them and the fortifications, with the water reaching up their necks, and afterwards began to fearlessly scale the town walls. The defenders mounted an energetic defense; they would lose their lives if the assault was successful. Pierre de Rieux ordered his men at the ramparts not to quit their positions under any circumstance, and had at his disposal a backup force in case any area faced difficulties.

The ferocious assault lasted for two hours, with many "gallant acts" being performed by both sides according to the chronicler Monstrelet. The assault was ultimately unsuccessful, and the defenders repulsed the attackers. The deaths of 80 or more attackers (Note: Among the dead was Robert Harling, maternal half-nephew of John Fastolf. He was the son of Cecily Mortimer, Fastolf's uterine half-sister.) in the ditches or under the walls led the English to evaluate that the attack could not be carried out without heavy casualties, and they sounded a retreat. Despite victorious, the besieged also suffered greatly. They repaired the broken structures, namely the walls and gates, and began looking towards the peace conference at Arras for help from their allies.

On 21 September, the Duke of Burgundy signed the Treaty of Arras with the disputed French king Charles VII, by which he permanently abandoned his English allies. Despite their overlord severing ties with England in the middle of the siege, the Burgundian contingent in the besieging army would stay until the end.

Upon the conclusion of the Congress of Arras, the French constable, Arthur de Richemont, went to Senlis. He was unable to gather a sufficiently powerful force to challenge the English at Saint-Denis, and Rieux, being aware of this, entered into negotiations with the besiegers for the conditional surrender of the garrison. The French were allowed to have their lives spared in return for surrendering the town and returning all prisoners they had made. On 4 October, the defending garrison left Saint-Denis, escorted by 600 cavalry. After 4 months, the town was under English rule once more. Parts the town were razed, with a notable exception of an area which lodged the son-in-law of Simon Morhier, the former English provost of Paris.

== Aftermath ==
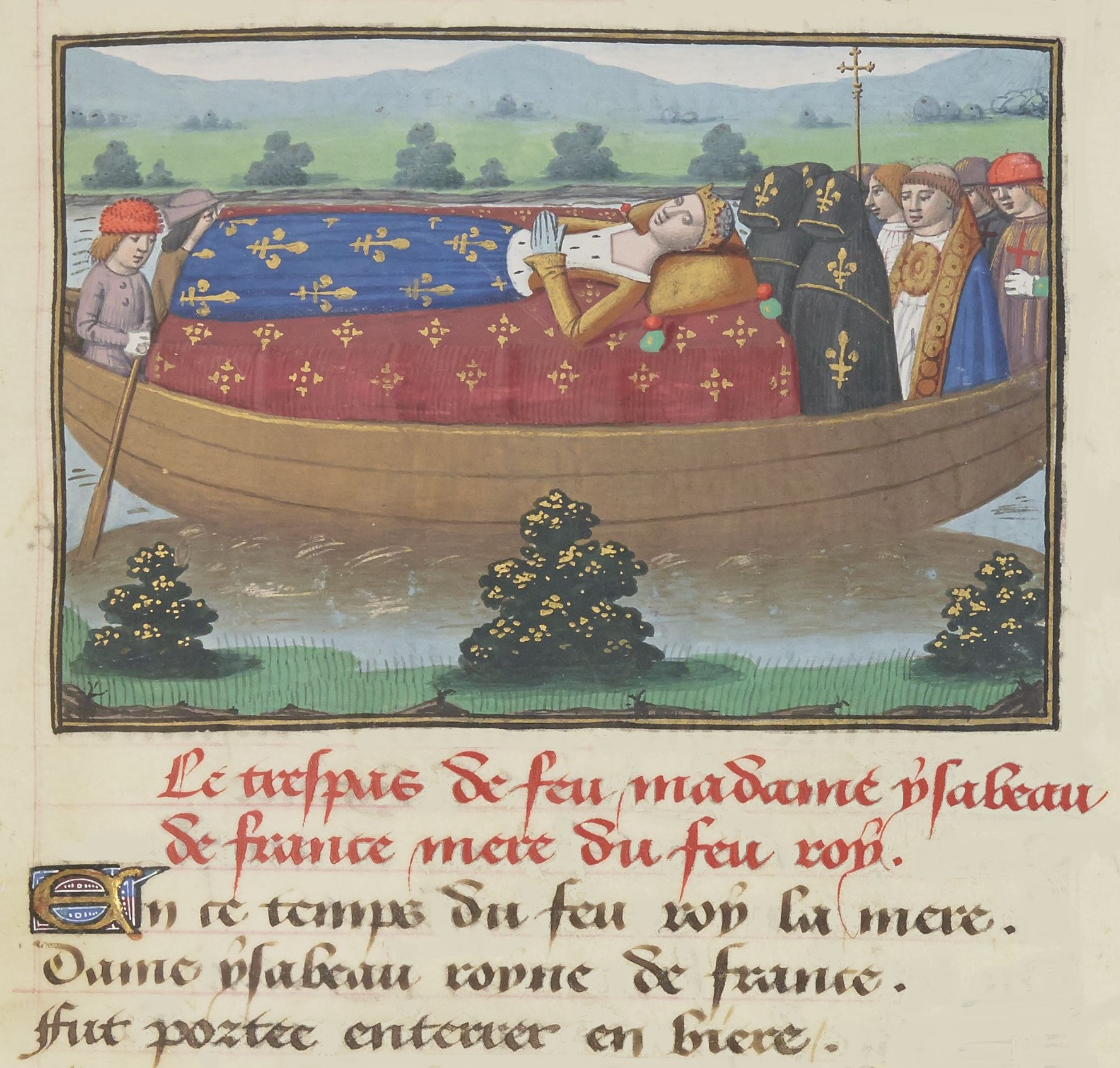
15th century illustration (from Vigiles de Charles VII) of Isabeau of Bavaria being carried through the Seine to be buried at Saint-Denis

Though the English had retaken an important area close to the capital, this was undermined by the French capture of Meulan, to the west of Saint-Denis, at night on 24 September. This blocked the main supply route from Normandy to Paris, and as a consequence food prices in the French capital rose dramatically. The Parisian population was also harassed by the recently released Armagnac garrison of Saint-Denis, who looted, pillaged, and kidnapped around the city.

On 24 September 1435, the dowager queen of France, Isabeau of Bavaria, maternal grandmother of Henry VI of England, had died. The capture of Saint-Denis, the traditional place of burial for French monarchs, allowed her to be buried alongside her deceased husband Charles VI of France. It was still too dangerous to allow the funeral party to travel by land, and so her body was taken by boat down the Seine.

The defection of Burgundy proved catastrophic to the English and nullified any gains by the capture of Saint-Denis. Much of English-ruled France began to collapse; Pierre de Rieux, recently relieved from the siege, surprised and captured Dieppe in Normandy on 29 October 1435.

Saint-Denis itself was besieged anew by the French and captured in February 1436, with an English relief army of around 800 men led by Sir Thomas Beaumont (Note: Thomas Beaumont (d. c. 1458), lord of Basqueville (Bacqueville or Bacqueville-en-Caux) in Normandy, captain of Château Gaillard since 1430, veteran of the siege of Orléans. He was a younger son of John Beaumont, 4th Baron Beaumont.) being almost destroyed. The French now tightened their siege of Paris, blockading the city on all sides; food prices in the city now reached famine levels. The citizens, who were primarily loyal to the Burgundians and not the English, opened the city gates to French forces on 13 April 1436. Four days later the English garrison negotiated its departure from the city. Among the commanders of the French force that retook the city was Jean de Villiers, who had fought alongside the English at Saint-Denis only a few months previously.
