= Siege of Paris (1435–1436) =

Conflict in Hundred Years' War

- Part of the Hundred Years' War
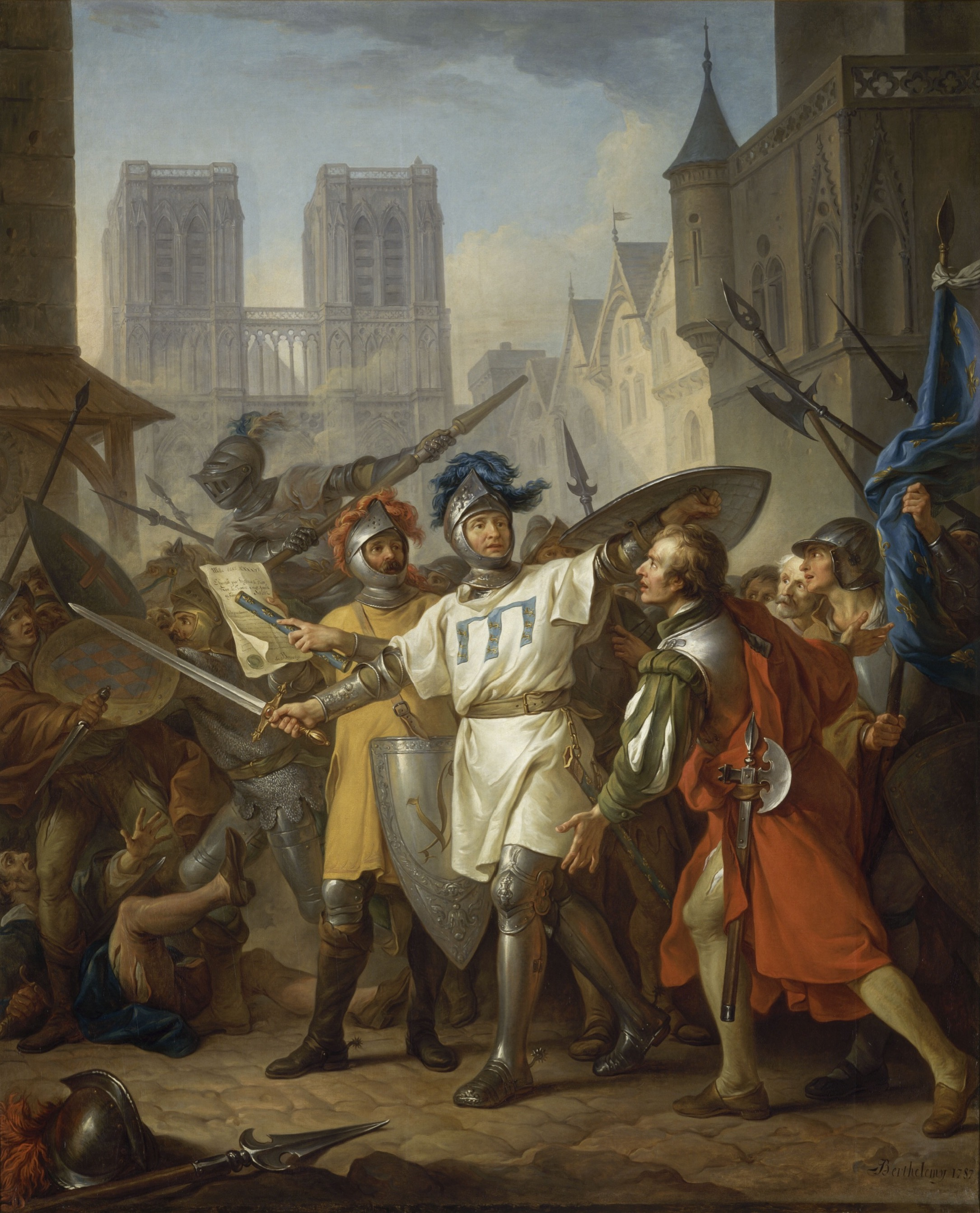
- Entry of the French army into Paris, 13 April 1436; Jean-Simon Berthélemy, 1787
Date	1st June 1435 – 17 April 1436
Location	Paris, Kingdom of France
Result	French victory

Belligerents
Kingdom of England	Kingdom of France; Burgundian State

Commanders and leaders
Robert Willoughby	Charles VII of France; Ambroise de Loré; Jean de Villiers; Arthur de Richemont; Jean de Dunois

Strength
5,000 (including 3,000 soldiers and 2,000 routiers); 3,000 reinforcements	5,000 soldiers of Arthur de Richemont Burgundian reinforcements

The siege of Paris of 1435-36 took place during the decisive Lancastrian phase of the Hundred Years' War. The resurgent forces of Charles VII of France, having reversed the tide of the conflict, set their sights on capturing the capital, Paris, which had been controlled by forces loyal to Henry V of England then Henry VI of England since 1420.

== Background ==
The year 1429 saw a dramatic transformation in the military situation of the French during the Hundred Years’ War. At the start of the year, France was on the brink of collapse: much of northern France, including Paris, was under English control, and the city of Orléans was besieged by English forces. Morale among the French was low, and the legitimacy of Charles VII, the Dauphin, was widely doubted. However, the arrival of Joan of Arc marked a turning point. Inspired by her leadership and religious conviction, French forces lifted the Siege of Orléans in May 1429—a victory that reversed years of setbacks. This triumph was followed by a series of swift French advances, including victories at Jargeau, Meung-sur-Loire, Beaugency, and Patay. By July Charles were crowned king at the Reims Cathedral after the successful March to Reims of the French army. Thereafter, the French attempted to capture Paris that September, but failed to do so.

In 1435, Charles sought to make another attempt at the capital. On 9 May 1435, his forces prevailed at the Battle of Gerberoy. Taking advantage of the disrupted English defences, on the early hours of 1 June, Armagnac troops led by the captains of nearby of Melun and Lagny seized Saint-Denis. Paris was now blockaded, making it difficult to supply the city by river or elsewhere. However, attempts to take Paris were complicated by the continuing conflict between the Armagnacs and Burgundians, then later remaining allied with the English.

== Forces present ==
=== Supporting Henry VI of England ===
- 3,000 English soldiers, mostly in Paris.
- The University of Paris.
- 2,000 routiers.
- 3,000 English reinforcements elsewhere in the region.

=== Supporting Charles VII of France ===
- The French royal army, dispersed in the region.
- 5,000 soldiers commanded by Arthur de Richemont.
- Burgundian reinforcements.

== The siege ==
Having received the reinforcement of the Burgundian troops to support, the French army defeated the English and their reinforcements at Saint-Denis on 6 April 1436, driving them back within the Paris city walls.

Paris was now completely encircled by the French army. Unable to receive food shipments, Parisians had witnessed the price of grain quadruple in two months.

On April 13, Richemont presented himself beneath the city walls. Charles VII had promised a total amnesty, leading to secret negotiations with the Parisian bourgeoisie. Michel de Lallier, Jean de La Fontaine and four other citizens allowed Charles's forces to enter, under the command of Arthur de Richemont and Jean de Dunois, This was achieved using a simple tactic: the bourgeois provoked a riot at the porte Saint-Denis, on the city's northern edge, obliging the English to mobilise their forces in that sector. Paris was then a city of narrow streets, lacking large boulevards that would allow for easy troop movements. This meant that troops needed to travel from one city gate to the next.

Taking advantage of the diversion, the French royal forces promptly attacked the Porte Saint-Jacques on the city's east end, now poorly defended. Once captured, the troops easily reached Les Halles and Notre-Dame.

The English now found themselves in a street battle, in which residents launched projectiles from their windows, requiring the English to retreat to the Bastille Saint-Antoine. On 17 April, the English garrison was permitted to withdraw from the city, leaving for Rouen.

== Aftermath ==
Charles VII finally entered Paris on 12 November 1437. He was taken aback by the condition of much of the city, having suffered from years of civil war and occupation. He permitted all Parisians who had fled to return, on condition that they pledge allegiance to him. After this siege, Paris would not be occupied by foreign troops for another 400 years, until the army of the Sixth Coalition defeated Napoleon's army at the Battle of Paris (1814) during the Napoleonic Wars.

== Bibliography ==
- Barker, Juliet (2012). Conquest: The English Kingdom of France 1417–1450 (PDF). Harvard University Press. Archived (PDF) from the original on 12 June 2018.
- Pollard, A. J. (1983). John Talbot and the War in France 1427–1453. London: Royal Historical Society. ISBN 978-0-901050-88-5.
- Vale, Malcolm (1974). Charles VII. Berkeley: University of California Press. OCLC 1288402090.
- Perroy, Edouard (1951). The Hundred Years War. London: Eyre & Spottiswoode. OCLC 1149428397.
- Reid, Peter (2007). By fire and sword : the rise and fall of English supremacy at arms: 1314-1485. London: Constable. ISBN 9781845295264.
- Vale, Malcom; et al. (The New Cambridge Medieval History) (2006). "France at the End of the Hundred Years War 1420-1461". 1415—1500. Vol. VII. Cambridge: Cambridge University Press. ISBN 978-0-521-38296-0.
