= L'Isle-Adam =

L'Isle-Adam may refer to:

Places

- L'Isle-Adam, Val-d'Oise, a commune in France
  - Château de L'Isle-Adam

People

- Philippe Villiers de L'Isle-Adam (1464-1534), Grand Master of the Knights Hospitaller
- Auguste Villiers de l'Isle-Adam (1838–1889), French symbolist writer
