= Pierre II de Villiers de L'Isle-Adam =

French noble

Pierre II de Villiers (1365–1398) was a medieval French noble. He resided in the Castle of L'Isle-Adam until he died in 1398. He was lord of L'Isle-Adam until the death of his father, and he later became the Chamberlain of King Charles VI.

== Family ==
Pierre II de Villiers was the son of Pierre I de Villiers (1320–1386) his second wife Marguerite de Vendome (1345–1382). He married Jeanne de Châtillon in 1383 and was the father of Jean II de Villiers (1384-1437), seigneur de L'Isle-Adam; Robert de Villiers, seigneur de Valmondois and Lauberdière and Jeanne de Villiers who married Lyonnel de Bournonville, lord of the Castle of the Bretèche. He was the brother of Perronelle de Villiers. He was the half-brother of Isabeau de Villiers; Catherine de Villiers, Jeanne de Villiers, Peter de Villiers, Jean de Villiers, and Laurent de Villiers.

Pierre II de Villiers and his family held in the Castle of L'Isle-Adam. His father made his will in 1383. He died in 1386. After his death, the estate ownership of L'Isle-Adam went to his son Pierre II de Villiers de l'Isle-Adam who later became the Chamberlain (officer-in-charge of managing the household for noblemen) of King Charles VI.

== Life ==
Pierre II de Villiers was Chamberlain of King Charles VI of France, when, on 21 May 1383, he married, by contract, Jeanne de Châtillon, daughter of Charles and Jeanne de Coucy.

As the King's Chamberlain, he negotiated with the Parisians on behalf of the Duke of Anjou.

In 1390, a suit was brought against him by his half-brother, also called Pierre, Archdeacon of Sologne, concerning the estate of their father. On 20 August 1390 Pierre II was ordered to pay his half-brother six hundred pounds in land and an increased dowry. However, on 9 April, the Court awarded him the lordships of L'Isle-Adam and Valmondois. His half-brother was obligated to keep and maintain the agreement made between them.

On 7 September 1396 a judgment recognized the Lord of Isle-Adam, the right warren on all non-agricultural land of his lordship. That law challenged several owners of the land.

Pierre II de Villiers died at age 34 in 1398. In 1411 he declared his holdings of L’Isle-Adam and Valmondois before the King.

== Descent ==
Pierre II de Villiers married Jeanne de Châtillon (1365–1457 ), daughter of Charles de Châtillon and Jeanne de Coucy, on 21 May 1383.

They were the parents of:

- Jeanne de Villiers de L'Isle-Adam, married to Lyonnel Bournonville, captain for the Duke of Burgundy, lord of the earth and the castle of La Bretèche, mother:
  - Mahaut of Bournonville (1400 - 1462)
  - Valeran Bournonville, governor of the fortress of Beaumont-en-Argonne, author of Bournonville in Champagne
- Jean de Villiers de L'Isle-Adam (1384–1437), Marshal of France, knight of the Order of the Golden Fleece, governor of Holland, captain of Pontoise and Paris, killed protecting the Duke Philip the Good during a riot in Bruges, lord of L'Isle-Adam, Domont and Yvor, married Jeanne de Vallengoujart and father:
  - Jacques de Villiers de L'Isle-Adam, Lord of L'Isle-Adam, chamberlain of the king, father:
    - Philippe Villiers de L'Isle-Adam, grand master of the Order of St. John of Jerusalem in 1521
    - Robert de Villiers, Lord of Valmondois and Boucherville
    - Jeanne de Villiers
    - Anne de Villiers de L'Isle-Adam
- Robert de Villiers de L’Isle-Adam
