= Jean de Villiers de L'Isle-Adam =

15th-century Marshal of France

Jean de Villiers Seigneur of L'Isle-Adam
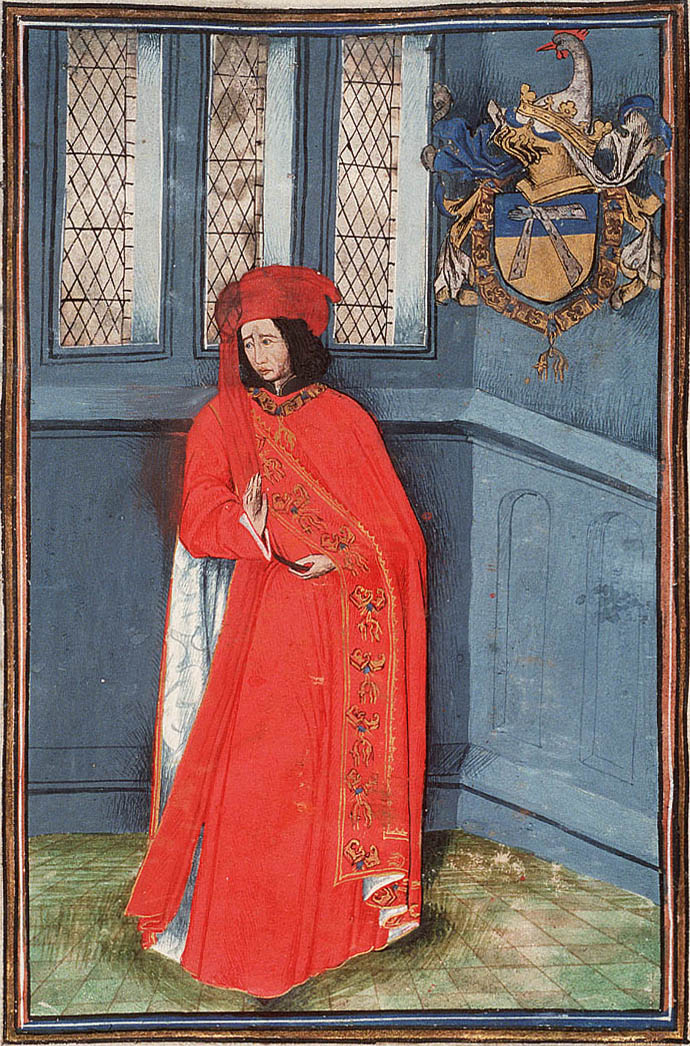
- Born: c. 1384
- Died: 22 May 1437; Bruges, Burgundian Netherlands
- Resting place: St. Donatian's Cathedral, Bruges
- Father: Pierre II de Villiers
- Awards: Marshal of France; Knight of the Golden Fleece

Jean de Villiers, Seigneur of L'Isle-Adam (c. 1384 – 22 May 1437) was a French nobleman and military commander who fought in the Hundred Years' War. As a supporter of the Duke of Burgundy, he fought on both sides of the conflict – English and French. He was a Marshal of France and a founding member of the knightly Order of the Golden Fleece.

== Life ==
Jean de Villiers (Jehan de Villers, Seigneur de l'Isle-Adam) was the son of Pierre II de Villiers and Jeanne de Châtillon in an old noble French family.

He was captured at the siege of Harfleur in 1415 by the English and released for ransom.
King Charles VI of France made him maître des eaux et forêts of Normandy.

=== Marshal of France ===
In the Armagnac–Burgundian Civil War, Villiers joined the Burgundians and became one of their leading officers. On 29 May 1418 he succeeded in conquering the city of Paris, and was involved in the following massacre, in which Bernard VII, Count of Armagnac was also killed. In the same year, John the Fearless appointed him Marshal of France, as successor of Boucicaut.

After holding Beauvais against the English, he was imprisoned in 1420 in the Bastille when Thomas Beaufort, Duke of Exeter conquered Paris. Released in 1422, he fought for the English under John of Lancaster, 1st Duke of Bedford, and besieged Meulan.

=== Knighthood ===
Arms of Villiers de L'Isle-Adam

Reappointed Marshal, he entered in the service of Philip the Good, Duke of Burgundy, and became his councilor. In October 1426, he became governor of the County of Holland and helped Philip the Good take control of the county during the Hook and Cod wars. In 1429 he became again governor of Paris, and successfully defended the city from a French attack by Joan of Arc. In 1430 he received the title of Knight in the Order of the Golden Fleece. The Order of the Golden Fleece was established on 10 January 1430, by Philip the Good, Duke of Burgundy, in celebration of the prosperous and wealthy domains united in his person that ran from Flanders to Switzerland. It was restricted to a limited number of knights, initially 24, of which Jean was selected to be one.

In 1432 he besieged Lagny-sur-Marne, and conquered Saint-Denis in 1435. After the reconciliation between France and Burgundy in the Treaty of Arras (1435), he returned in French service under King Charles VII of France, and chased the English from Pontoise and Paris.

Villiers was killed on 22 May 1437 in the city of Bruges, during skirmishes between the people of Bruges and a force accompanying Philip the Good. He was buried in the St. Donatian's Cathedral in Bruges.
