= Siege of Paris (1429) =

1429 battle of the Hundred Years' War

Coordinates: 48.8566°N 2.3518°E

- Part of the Hundred Years' War (1415–53 phase)
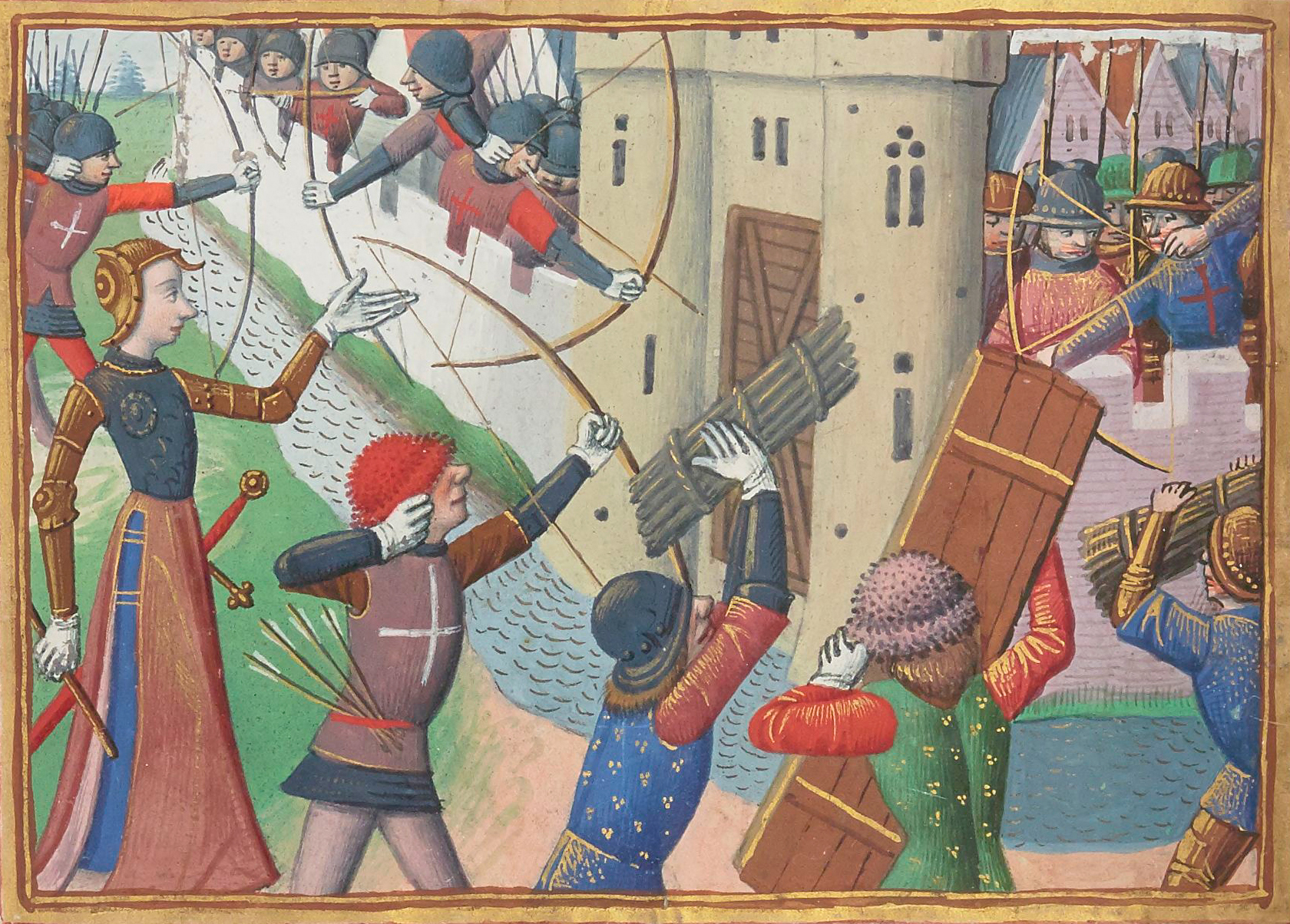
- Joan of Arc at the porte Saint-Honoré during the siege of Paris of 1429
| Date | 3–8 September 1429 |
| Location | Paris, Kingdom of France |
| Result | English and Burgundian victory |

Belligerents
| Kingdom of France | Kingdom of England; Burgundian State |

Commanders and leaders
| Charles VII; Joan of Arc (WIA); Jean II d'Alençon; Gilles de Rais; Jean de Brosse | Jean de Villiers; Simon Morhier |

Strength
| 10,000 | 3,000 English citizens of Paris |

Casualties and losses
| 500 dead 1,000 wounded | |

The siege of Paris was an assault undertaken in September 1429 during the Hundred Years' War by the troops of the recently crowned King Charles VII of France, with the notable presence of Joan of Arc, to take the city held by the English and Burgundians. King Charles's French troops failed to enter Paris, defended by the governor Jean de Villiers de L'Isle-Adam and the provost Simon Morhier, with the support of much of the city's population.

== Background ==
After Henry V of England entered Paris in May 1422, the English administration was sympathetic to the citizens of Paris, confirming their former privileges and giving new ones. The Parisians had accepted the English mostly because of their hatred of Charles VII (whom they had nicknamed "King of Bourges") and the Armagnac party, who threatened the many liberties that the city had obtained over the centuries.

After the battle of Montépilloy on 26 August 1429, Joan of Arc and Duke John II of Alençon took Saint-Denis, a town north of Paris. On August 28, Charles VII signed the truce of Compiègne which excepted from the armistice Saint-Denis (which was already taken), St. Cloud, Vincennes, Charenton and Paris.

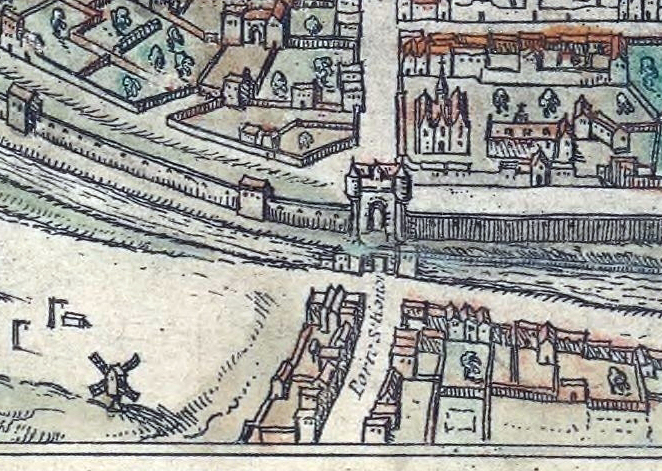
The Porte Saint-Honoré a century later, in 1530 (Braun and Hogenberg plan).

In early September, Charles VII established his camp at the butte de Saint-Roch.

On September 3, Joan of Arc accompanied by the Dukes of Alençon and Bourbon, the counts of Vendôme and Laval, Marshals Gilles de Rais and La Hire and their troops, lodged in the village of La Chapelle. After several days of performing recognitions and skirmishes on various gates of Paris, Joan of Arc prayed in St. Genevieve chapel. On the morning of Thursday, 8 September 1429, Joan of Arc, the Duke of Alençon, Marshals Gilles de Rais and Jean de Brosse Boussac began their march from the Village of La Chapelle to storm the Porte Saint-Honoré. Joan of Arc installed culverins on the butte de Saint-Roch to support the attack.

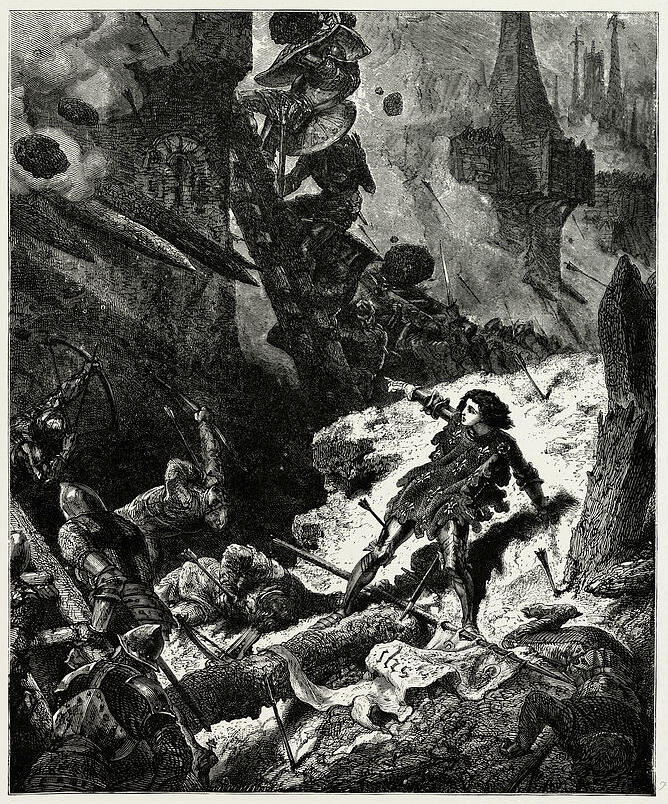
Joan of Arc at siege of Paris

The Parisians, believing that the Armagnacs wanted to destroy the city from top to bottom, made a vigorous defence. Joan of Arc was given the task of leading the assault to capture the city by Charles VII. Joan of Arc charged towards the main gate with the French army and tried to cross the city's water-filled moat in front of the gate. The French failed to capture any section of the gatehouse and its surrounding walls and suffered extremely heavy casualties. Joan of Arc was wounded by a crossbow bolt in the thigh. Joan was then dragged away from the battlefield and was brought back to her house in La Chapelle. Although she wished to resume the attack on Paris, Charles VII ordered her to withdraw to the Abbey of Saint-Denis. After four hours of assaulting the walls of Paris, Charles VII sounded the retreat as no progress had been made. The city would remain under English control.

== Consequences ==
The city was defended by about 3,000 English commanded by marshal Simon Morhier and governor Jean de Villiers de L'Isle-Adam, which forced Charles VII and his army of 10,000 soldiers to retreat.

Having failed by force, Charles VII, tried to take the city otherwise. In 1430, he staged a plot that was discovered by the English, and led to the hanging of six Parisians on the scaffold. In 1432 and 1434, further attempts were made to open the gates of Paris to the forces of Charles VII, but were prevented by Parisians. After the Duke of Burgundy had withdrawn his support for the English as a result of the Treaty of Arras (1435), on 13 April 1436 the Parisians opened the city gates to Jean de Dunois and Arthur de Richemont.

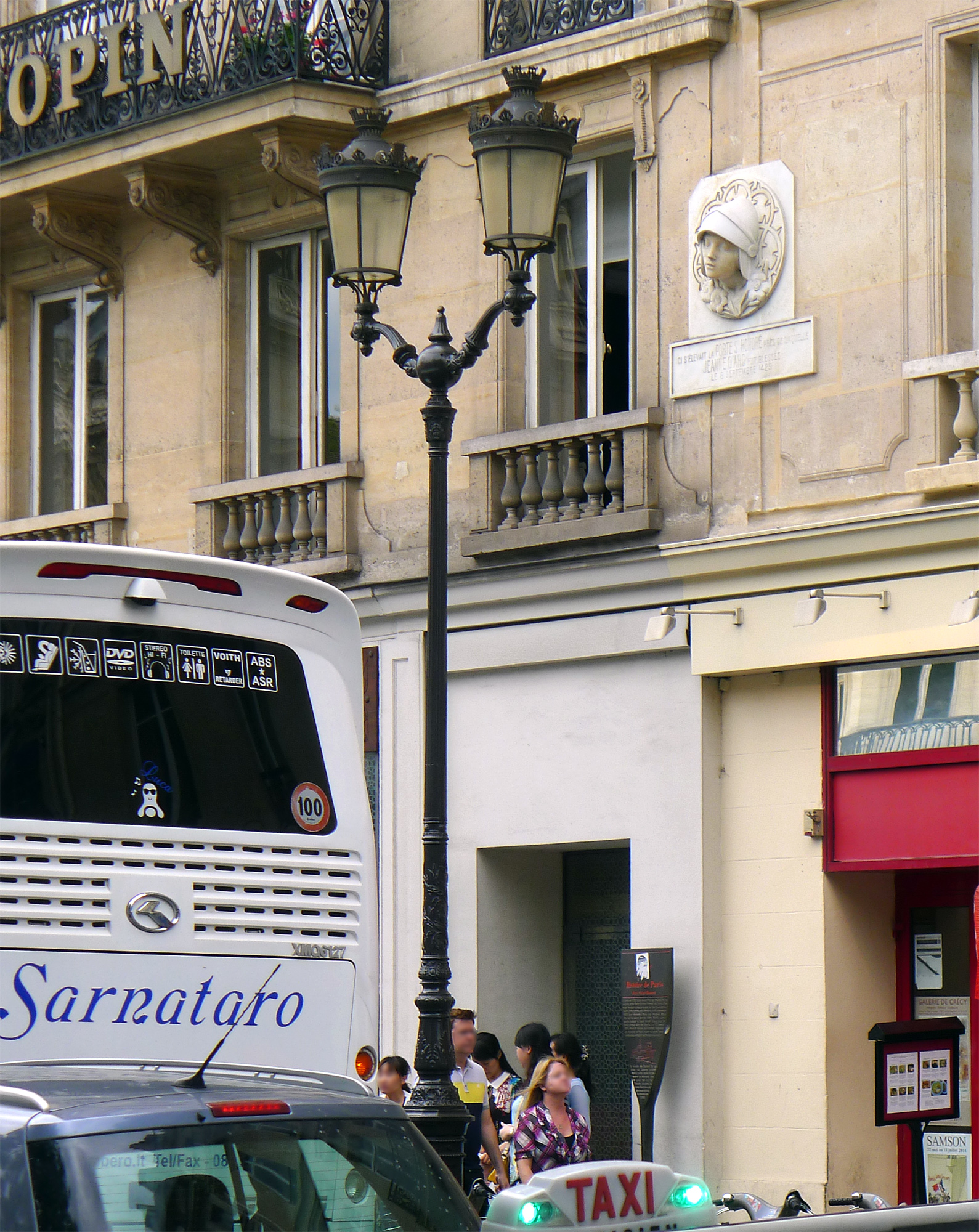
Saint-Honoré street at numbers 161-163

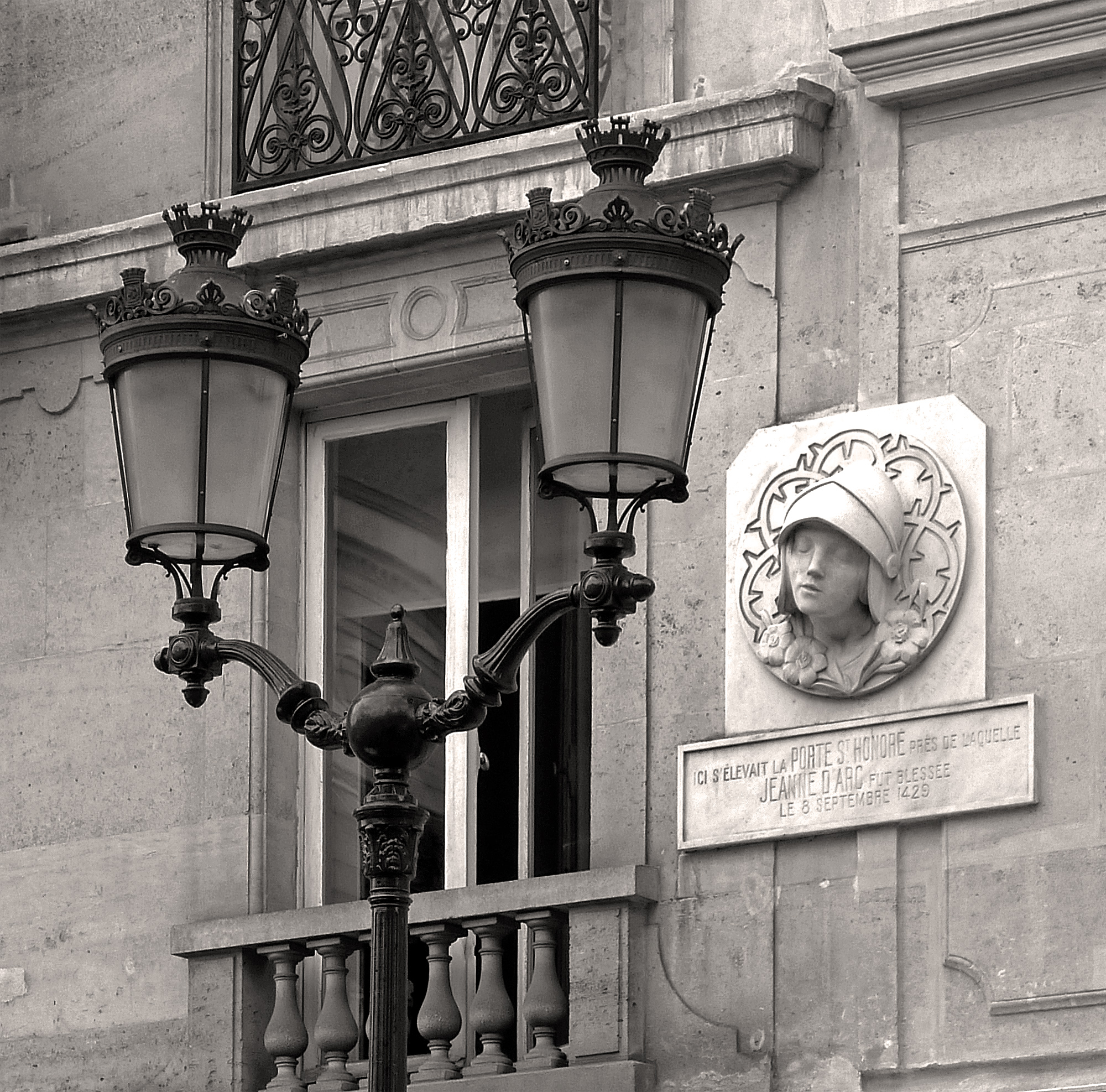
Commemorative plaque
