= Simon Morhier =

- Lord of Gilles and Villiers-le-Morhier
- Born: c. 1390
- Died: c. 1450; La Boissière-École
- Buried: Saint-Honoré de Paris
- Occupation: Administrator, soldier

Provost of Paris (fr)
- In office 1 December 1422 – 1432
- Monarch: Henry 'II' (VI of England)
- Preceded by: Pierre Le Verrat (fr)
- Succeeded by: Gilles de Clamecy

Councillor of France and Normandy
- In office 24 June 1437 – c. 1449
- Monarch: Henry VI of England
- Governor: The Duke of York; The Earl of Warwick; The Duke of Somerset

Military service
- Allegiance: Burgundian party Kingdom of England
- Conflicts: Hundred Years' War: Siege of Montargis (1427) (surrendered); Battle of Rouvray (1429); Siege of Paris (1429); Siege of Paris (1436) (surrendered); Siege of Meaux (1439); Siege of Creil (1441); Siege of Pontoise (1441); Action at Torcy (1449) (surrendered)

Simon Morhier (c. 1390–c. 1450), lord of Gilles, near Nogent-le-Roi, in the Chartrain country, was a medieval French nobleman who sided with the English during the Hundred Years' War. He was provost of Paris during the English occupation in the 15th century, and remained a steadfast supporter of the English cause in France throughout his life.

== Burgundian partisanship ==
A knight and a gentleman, Morhier became involved in the ongoing struggle between the French ruling class for control of the regency of the mad King Charles VI. He became a partisan of the Burgundians against the Armagnacs, and entered into the service of Isabeau of Bavaria (the Queen of France) as butler.

After Burgundy's English allies took control of Paris in 1420, Morhier cooperated with the new regime. Upon the accession of the infant King Henry to the French throne in 1422, the French regency was assumed by the child's uncle, John, Duke of Bedford, who enacted policies to acclimate the French to English rule, and appointed Burgundian partisans to positions of power. Morhier was named provost of Paris by Bedford on 1 December 1422, succeeding Pierre Le Verrat and Jean de La Baume, and holding this post until 1432. He was accused of abusing his functions, and had to testify before the public prosecutor in front of the parliament.

Morhier seems to have been involved in diplomatic missions to Aragon. For this, and other services rendered, he received a gift from the French crown on 31 May 1425. It included the lordships of Saint-Piat (which had belonged to his ancestor Guillaume Morhier), Montlouet, and Talvoisin. On 23 July 1430, he is described in a document as lord of Ménil. On 11 August 1431, he was granted Houdan, whose castle was located in a strategic position.

He fought and was taken prisoner at the failed Siege of Montargis in 1427. In February 1429, alongside the English John Fastolf, Morhier led the military escort of a supply convoy destined to the ongoing Siege of Orléans, and successfully defended it from a French ambush at the Battle of the Herrings. One of the few casualties on the English side included his nephew, and Morhier himself was again captured by the enemy. In September 1429, however, he repulsed an attack by Joan of Arc on Paris. In 1432, when the French took Chartres by surprise, Morhier unsuccessfully tried to recapture it. In 1433 or 1434, Morhier was made captain of Montlhéry. He campaigned in the Cotentin in 1435.

== Career after 1435 ==
After the Duke of Burgundy abandoned the alliance with England by signing the Treaty of Arras (1435), Morhier remained faithful to the English party. He was once more taken prisoner at the bridge of Charenton in 1436, when the French took Paris. His custodian, a certain Denis de Chailly, released him in return for the lordships of Mesnil-Aubry and Montanglaut, and Morhier was allowed to leave the French capital alongside the rest of the English garrison and their French loyalists.

Henry VI of England gave Morhier a generous pension and a series of important offices. On 24 June 1437, he was appointed a member of the king's Grand Council of France and Normandy, and from March 1438 to November 1445 or February 1446 Morhier was treasurer of France and Normandy. He became captain of Dreux, La Roche-Guyon (1440), and Saint-Lô (1445), and assisted in the defence of Meaux (1439), of Creil and of Pontoise (1441).

As part of a series of confrontations leading to the rupture of the truce of Tours (1444–1449), Morhier was captured on 25 February 1449 at Torcy-le-Grand in a raid conducted by the French garrison of nearby Dieppe. It happened in the middle of a meeting between English partisans, of which Morhier was present. He died in captivity between 4 July 1449 and 31 October 1452, a date when his wife is described as a widow.

== Family ==
Coat of arms of the Morhier family

Simon Morhier was the son of Étienne Morhier (died after 20 August 1395) by his wife Gauchère La Vernière. They married perhaps in about 1385–1389.

Morhier married firstly Blanche de Popincourt, lady of Mesnil-Aubry (died 10 December 1422), in about 1420. They had one son:

- Jean Morhier, who in 1458 married Jeanne de Bretagne, illegitimate daughter of Francis I, Duke of Brittany. The couple had a daughter, Marguerite Morhier, who on 16 November 1495 married Jean Vipart, and had issue.

His second marriage was to Jeanne de Laigny, or Lagny (died before 28 April 1436), in about 1425. They had a daughter:

- Isabelle Morhier (aft. 1425–aft. 1506), who married Guy II le Bouteiller and had issue. A certain descendant of Isabelle named Catherine de Baillon has a recorded presence on French Canada in the 17th century, and through her, many people in North America can claim descent from Simon Morhier.

Morhier's third and last marriage was to Catherine de Gavre d'Escornaix (aft. 1385–bef. 1472), between 4 January and 9 April 1440 at La Roche-Guyon, at around the same time Morhier was appointed to the captaincy of that location. The union remained childless. Catherine de Gavre d'Escornaix was the mother of Guy II le Bouteiller from her first marriage with Guy I le Bouteiller, who was the husband of Simon Morhier's daughter Isabelle Morhier. Simon Morhier and Catherine de Gavre d'Escornaix would be the grandparents of Isabelle Morhier's son Jean de le Bouteillière, Lord of Boissière, who was the great great great grandfather of Catherine de Baillon through her father Alphonse de Baillon's mother Renee Maillard.
