= Dual monarchy of England and France =

Dual monarchy in medieval France

- 1422–1453
- Flag The Royal Arms of England during Henry VI's reign
- Status: English-held territories in France
- Capital: None
- Government: Dual monarchy
- King of England and France
  - 21 October 1422 – 19 October 1453: Henry VI of England and II of France
- Regents of France
  - 1422-1435: John, Duke of Bedford and Philip III, Duke of Burgundy
- Lieutenant-general and governor of France
  - 8 May 1436 – 16 July 1437: Richard Plantagenet, Duke of York (1st tenure)
  - 16 July 1437 - 30 April 1439: Richard Beauchamp, 13th Earl of Warwick
  - 1439-1440: John Beaufort, Earl of Somerset
  - 2 July 1440 – 29 September 1445: Richard Plantagenet, Duke of York (2nd tenure)
  - 24 December 1446 – ?: Edmund Beaufort, Marquess of Dorset
- Historical era: Lancastrian War
  - Treaty of Troyes: 21 May 1420
  - Death of Charles VI of France: 21 October 1422
  - Coronation of Henry II at Notre-Dame de Paris: 16 December 1431
  - Treaty of Arras: 21 September 1435
  - Loss of Bordeaux: 19 October 1453
Preceded by	Succeeded by
Kingdom of France; Kingdom of England	Kingdom of France; Kingdom of England

The dual monarchy of England and France existed during the latter phase of the Hundred Years' War when Charles VII of France and Henry VI of England disputed the succession to the throne of France. It commenced on 21 October 1422 upon the death of King Charles VI of France, who had signed the Treaty of Troyes which gave the French crown to his son-in-law Henry V of England and Henry's heirs. It excluded King Charles's son, the Dauphin Charles, who by right of primogeniture was the heir to the Kingdom of France. Although the Treaty was ratified by the Estates-General of France, the act was a contravention of the French law of succession which decreed that the French crown could not be alienated. Henry VI, son of Henry V, became king of both England and France and was recognised only by the English and Burgundians until 1435 as King Henry II of France. He was crowned King of France on 16 December 1431 in Paris.

In practical terms, King Henry's claim to de jure sovereignty and legitimacy as king of France was only recognised in the English and allied-controlled territories of France which were under the domination of his French regency council, while the Dauphin ruled as King of France in part of the realm south of the river Loire.

The Dauphin was crowned as King Charles VII of France at Reims on 17 July 1429, largely through the martial efforts of Joan of Arc, who believed it was her mission to free France from the English and to have the Dauphin Charles crowned at Reims. In 1435, the Duke of Burgundy, released from his obligations to Henry VI by a papal legate, recognised Charles VII as the rightful king of France.. The defection of this powerful French noble marked the decline of Henry's de facto reign over France The dual monarchy came to an end with the capture of Bordeaux by Charles VII's forces on 19 October 1453 following their final victory at the Battle of Castillon (17 July 1453), thus bringing the Hundred Years' War to a conclusion. The English were expelled from all of the territories which they had controlled in France, with the sole exception of Calais. Charles VII had thus established himself as the undisputed king of almost all of France (save Calais, which remained under English rule for another century).

== Background ==
The English and French had been constantly at war over hereditary sovereignty in France; the Hundred Years' War (1337–1453) escalated, and the conflict between the two nations reached its peak in an intermittent series of belligerent phases, with each phase usually ending with a temporary truce lasting for a few years. In the first phase Edward III won some extraordinary victories against the French, most notably at Crécy and Sluys. His son Edward, the Black Prince also captured the French king John II at the battle of Poitiers in 1356, and routed the French army. The year 1360 marked the end of the first phase and an opportunity for peace.

In the Treaty of Brétigny the French king was ransomed for an amount equal to twice the French kingdom's Gross. In addition, the French granted Edward III an extended Aquitaine, thus restoring one of the main duchies of the previous Angevin Empire. Edward III was, however, forced to give up his title as the rightful king to the throne of France, this claim being based on his mother, Isabella. Charles V ascended to the throne, and in 1369 hostilities were reopened by the French declaring war, thus breaking the treaty. This time they led to embarrassing strategic defeats for the English side. Charles' strategy was to attack the castles, where English victories were less certain, and to avoid pitched battles with the English; with this important strategic move, the extended English holdings in Aquitaine were quickly recaptured. The English, now on the defensive, lost more territory, retaining only parts of Gascony and a few coastal cities. By now, Edward was aging and no longer fit to lead in battle. His son, the Prince of Wales, predeceased him by a year, and so when Edward III died in 1377 it was his grandson Richard II who became king.

There was another truce in 1396 when Richard II married Isabella of Valois, a daughter of King Charles VI of France, thus marking the end of the second phase. Peace did not last long however, as, in 1399, Henry IV usurped Richard's throne while Richard was away in Ireland, thus provoking French hostility in 1403 which marked the beginning of the third phase of the war.

== The House of Lancaster and Anglo-French relations ==
In the beginning, Henry claimed he was retrieving his confiscated region of Lancaster, and wrote to Richard that he had "no wish or right to depose your highness as king". Henry, nevertheless, remained firmly on the throne, and Richard II was deposed. Internal strife reached its climax during his reign, with the rebellions of Owain Glyndŵr (in Wales) and of the Percy family (Henry's old primary supporters) in the North. Henry, however, was least involved politically. Civil War was raging in France, especially between the parties of Armagnac and the Burgundians. Charles VI's brother Louis, Duke of Orléans, was assassinated on the order of the Duke of Burgundy, John the Fearless. This was largely due to a scandalous affair with the Duchess of Burgundy, which started as a rumor but would later involve Charles VII. Henry IV was considered a key ally during the civil war. The Armagnacs even offered to give back the Duchy of Aquitaine in support of military services, although Aquitaine was forgotten when the Armagnacs won. Henry sent an expeditionary force in 1412 to aid them.

The civil war continued with persecution on both sides, the sack of Soissons by the Armagnacs and the control of Paris by the Burgundians. John the Fearless claimed to be the regent of the young dauphin Charles and the insane king Charles VI. Henry IV, the usurper, died in 1413. His son, Henry, was still in his mid twenties when he became king.

== The Warrior King ==
The main feature of Henry IV's reign in England was internal strife and rebellion, and as a result, Henry V took part in battles from an early age. His first test in battle was in the Welsh wars: Henry fought at the Battle of Shrewsbury in 1403. He took a Welsh arrow in the lower part of his face; it passed through his jaw and out the other side. Henry's knights were charging the Welsh positions, so in spite of his wound, Henry refused to leave the field and the English won the day.

Henry would employ the English and Welsh archers on a massive scale in his campaign at Agincourt. Upon the death of Henry IV, Thomas, Duke of Clarence (Henry V's younger brother) was supported as the heir rather than Henry. The dauphin was made Duke of Guyenne, which was English Gascony, as the Armagnacs wanted Gascony back under their own sovereignty. Clarence was to lead the English in Gascony, not Henry; this would give him a chance to take the throne of England. While Clarence was away in Gascony, Henry V took the throne. Henry had also successfully fended off the dauphin's designs on the Guyenne region. As Henry started his reign in 1413, and the civil war in France was still on, Henry demanded that the King of France give him back an extended Aquitaine, Normandy, the ports of Provence, the old county of Toulouse (which was vassal to the Angevin empire), and the provinces of Maine and Anjou. The French refused to accept his demands, and they ignored his claims. In 1415, at the age of twenty-eight, Henry began his invasion of France which would culminate in the Battle of Agincourt.

=== 1415 campaign ===
On 11 August 1415, Henry sailed for France, where his forces besieged the fortress at Harfleur, capturing it on 22 September. Afterwards, Henry had to march with his army across the French countryside towards Calais. On 25 October 1415, on the plains near the village of Agincourt, he turned to engage a pursuing French army in battle. Despite his men-at-arms being exhausted and outnumbered, Henry led his men into battle, decisively defeating the French who died in the thousands. Most of those taken prisoners were slaughtered by order of Henry, who spared only the most illustrious. This victorious conclusion, from the English viewpoint, was only the first step in the campaign.

People of England, cease your work and pray, For the glorious victory of Crispin's day; Despite their scorn for Englishmen's renown, The odious might of France came crashing down.

This Latin epigram was one of many produced after the battle and came from a long tradition of such work in Chronicles.

=== 1417 campaign ===
So, with those two potential enemies gone, and after two years of patient preparation following the battle of Agincourt, Henry renewed the war on a larger scale in 1417. Lower Normandy was quickly conquered, and Rouen cut off from Paris and besieged. The French were paralysed by the disputes between the Burgundians and the Armagnacs. Henry skilfully played them off one against the other, without relaxing his warlike approach. In January 1419, Rouen fell. The Norman French who had resisted were severely punished: Alain Blanchard, who had hung English prisoners from the walls, was summarily executed; Robert de Livet, Canon of Rouen, who had excommunicated the English king, was sent to England and imprisoned for five years

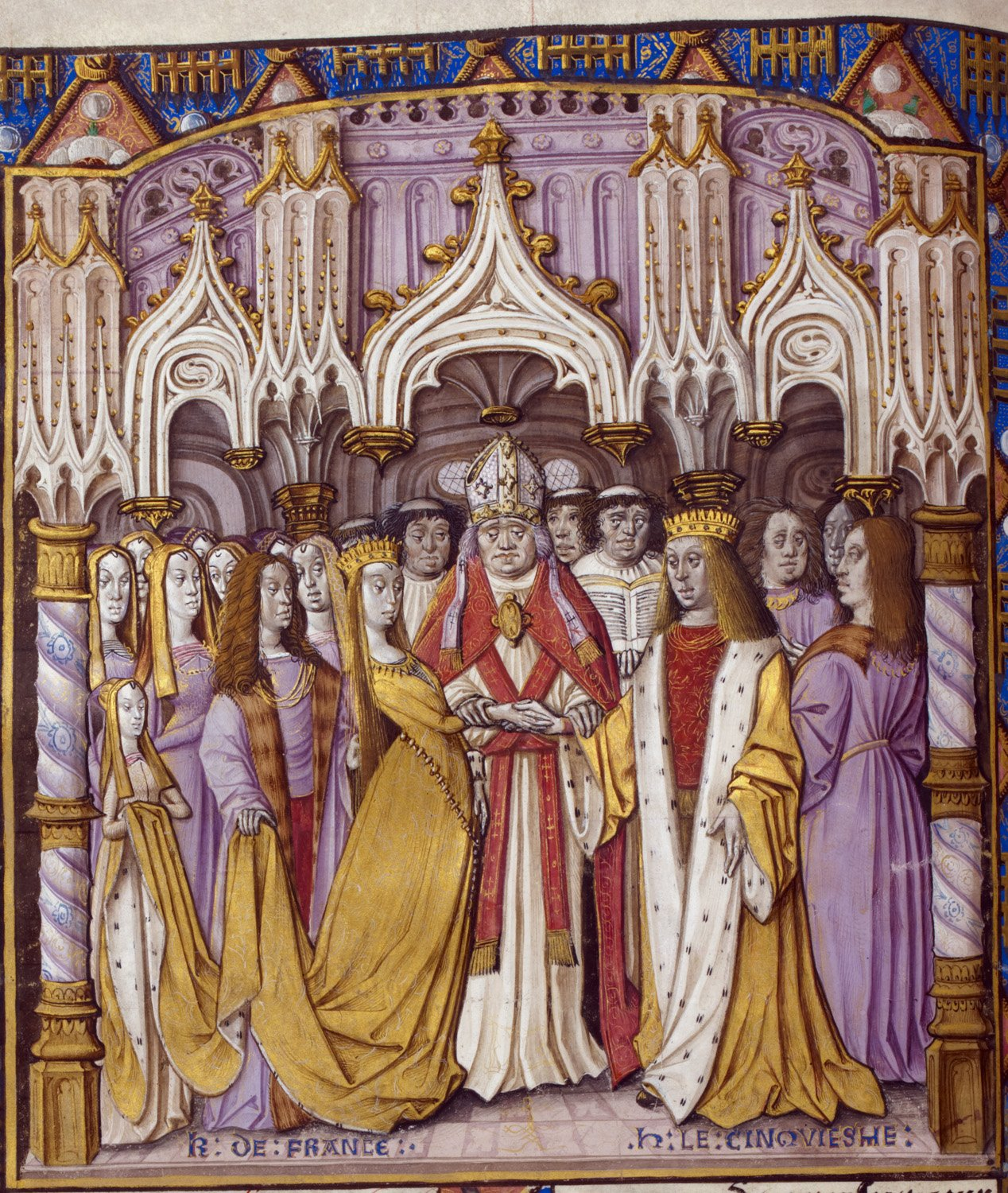
Henry V's marriage to Catherine of Valois

By August, the English were outside the walls of Paris. The intrigues of the French parties culminated in the assassination of John the Fearless by the Dauphin's partisans at Montereau (10 September 1419). Philip the Good, the new duke, and the French court threw themselves into Henry's arms. After six months of negotiation, the Treaty of Troyes recognised Henry as the heir and regent of France (see English Kings of France), and, on 2 June 1420, Henry married Catherine of Valois, the daughter of Charles VI of France. From June to July, Henry's army besieged and took the castle at Montereau, then Melun in November, returning to England shortly thereafter. Henry VI was born the following year.

=== 1421 campaign ===
On 10 June 1421, Henry sailed back to France for what would be his last military campaign. From July to August, his forces besieged and captured Dreux, thus relieving allied forces at Chartres. That October, his forces lay siege to Meaux, capturing it on 2 May 1422. Henry V died suddenly on 31 August 1422 at the Château de Vincennes near Paris, apparently from dysentery, which he had contracted during the siege of Meaux. He was thirty-five years old. Before his death, Henry V had named his brother John, Duke of Bedford regent of France in the name of his son Henry VI, then only a few months old. Henry V did not live to be crowned King of France himself, as he might confidently have expected after the Treaty of Troyes, as the sickly Charles VI, whose heir he had been named, survived him by two months. His son Henry, who was born the year before, succeeded his father as king Henry VI of England and, six months later, his maternal grandfather as king of France.

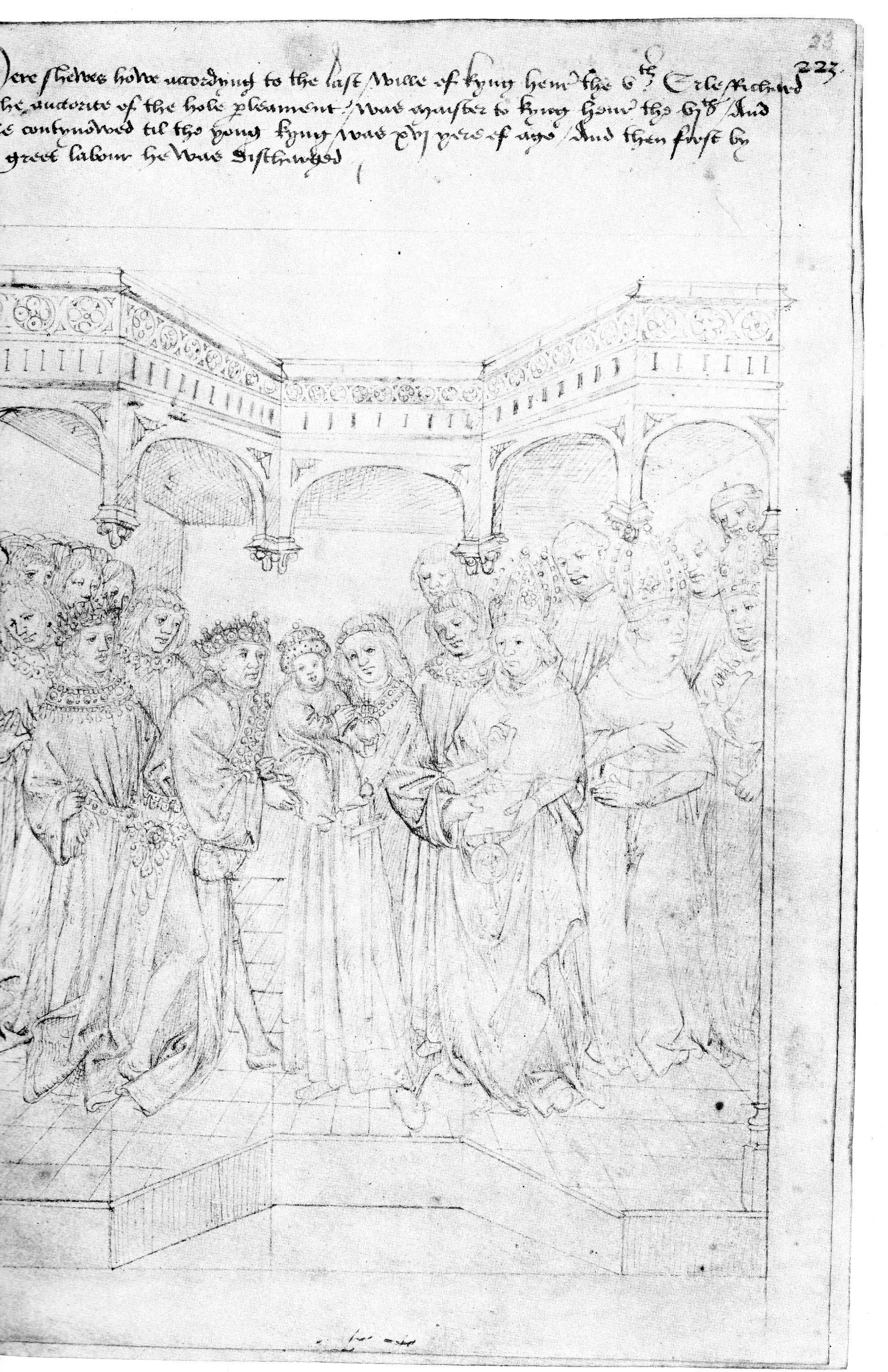
Henry VI, aged nine months, is shown being placed in the care of Richard de Beauchamp, 13th Earl of Warwick

== 1422: The question of regent upon French succession ==
After Henry V's death, the issue of the regency to the infant king Henry VI was resolved by meetings between Bedford, Burgundy and the French Estates-General. The Settlement of Troyes was reaffirmed in accordance with it; Bedford was made keeper of Normandy and Burgundy and may have been named regent for the king of France. Bedford was a little uncertain whether Burgundy would relinquish his status as keeper of Normandy, so he wrote to London five days later to advertise his position as Regent of England, then of France. Bedford had no reason to contradict Henry V, but if he could not be regent for his French king, he would be as his English Regent. At the time, Bedford was still referring to himself as "gubernator Normandiae", governor of Normandy, on 1 November six days after the letter was dispatched to London. Bedford started to emerge as French regent for his nephew King Henry VI of England and France. At the same time the Treaty of Troyes was reaffirmed, and on 19 November Bedford presided as French regent in the Parlement de Paris and dedicated himself to be working for the good of France.

Henry VI was also now King of France united with Normandy, and Gascony, by the Treaty of Troyes, passed directly to the French king Charles VI; when Henry VI of England succeeded to the French crown in 1422 it was included as part of the jurisdiction. The Duke of Bedford was content and he made no appeal to return to England, returning only in 1425 to England in an urgent meeting with Bishop Henry Beaufort. Philip of Burgundy could hardly resist English wishes, for he needed their support after the murder of his father, John the Fearless by the henchmen of the dauphin (now de facto Charles VII of France). Henry V's arrangements had one fatal flaw: not until the last few days of his life had he thought he would predecease Charles VI. Moreover, the treaty had restricted Henry's freedom on his deathbed. The arrangements he had made were to cover the short term (up to Charles VI's death) and the long term (when Henry VI would become king of both France and England). This is a major reason for Burgundy's alliance with England and the steadfastness of English commanders to the battlefield.

Charles VI's death had in no way affected the Anglo-Burgundian alliance or the legal dual monarchy of England and France. Monstrelet the Burgundian is the only contemporary to record that Burgundy backed down to the regency to the French king in order to have Bedford as Regent. He claimed to record Henry V's last words on his deathbed, and also the content of the recorded speech. It made an insult to Gloucester by further saying Henry had maintained the regency of England to Exeter. The chronicle, however, was written after Gloucester's invasion of the Low Countries in 1425 which provoked Burgundy's hostility and after Gloucester repelled Duke Philip's attack on Calais in 1436. This was a distortion of fact. Monstrelet was trying to heighten Burgundian self-esteem and to explain why Burgundy dropped the regency in 1422. The St. Albans' chronicler recorded that Burgundy was never entrusted with the regency of France. However, his work ends six weeks before Charles VI's death and mentions nothing beyond that. Henry V may have not inquired about any specific regent for France, but Bedford was unopposed.

== English regency ==
Henry V's wish that Gloucester be appointed regent for England was controversial, and not clear in any sense that there was any named candidate to adopt the regency to England. On 7 November 1422, which was the day of Henry V's solemn burial at Westminster, dukes of Gloucester and Exeter and Bishop Beaufort studied the attached last wills of Henry. There was some agreement on the authority of the dead king's wishes, but until all of Henry's directions were carried out, there was still going to be objections to Humphrey. John, Duke of Bedford, unsure of his future in France, issued an objection to Humphrey's regency on 26 November. Some lords supported the idea of Gloucester as regent because of his youth, and his emerging reputation; however, most of the lords still disliked the idea and expressed great misgivings about the powers which were later to be bestowed upon him by the codicil of 1422.

Gloucester realised the idea of using history or precedent; in 1216, the first English minority since the Norman conquest was upheld and later, William Marshal, 1st Earl of Pembroke who was rector to king Henry III while the latter was in his minority. He wanted to have the same authority but as wardship to the young king. The lords countered that this precedent was too far back in time, and furthermore Richard II was in his minority as King but John of Gaunt (Humphrey's grandfather) was given no specific position in the council. They ruled with general consensus between the gentry rather than a single rector to the king. Bedford was rector of France because a single regent was favoured in France rather than a ruling council and the dual monarchy existed through a personal union and each kingdom is allowed with their own traditions and customs. The lords did not want to attack Humphrey personally in his pretensions to regent but rather the will itself. They denied that Henry V had any right to determine the governance of England or of disposing of any royal land. The will itself was too inclined to Roman law and rather heavily foreign to the English. It was said Gloucester's keepership was made forfeit by Henry's death.

Gloucester was given a blow and was only to act in affairs by council permission as well as by opening and closing parliament. However, it was not the only drawback and since Bedford was heir to the throne of France as well as to that of England, if he returned from France he would take Gloucester's position as head regent with the permission of council temporarily until he withdrew back to his regency in France. Gloucester's position was severely limited in England but both realms were to benefit for the time being.

== The French realm ==
Staying in the offensive and maintaining French possessions meant that the English navy was now a second defence. In 1420, the Treaty of Troyes achieved political stability as did the Anglo-Burgundian alliance. In 1423, the alliance further included John VI, Duke of Brittany. The English, under Thomas Montacute, 4th Earl of Salisbury, were moving towards the Loire by 1428.

In the 1420s, Gascony had received no harm from any of the Valois attempts to capture the area, as it was isolated by both sea and land from the northern French territories. Gascony was largely protected by French nobles sympathetic to the English cause and there were negotiations with the Languedoc gentry, such as the Count of Foix. Calais was protected by its garrison and local merchant community which exported wool to Northern Europe and England and making good commercial relations with the Low Countries. Normandy and the Île-de-France region was protected by the French Regent and Rheims by the Duke of Burgundy. The only sensitive part was in the Channel where Anglo-Breton relations and attitudes affected the safekeeping of south-western English waters and the passing of ships to Gascony.

The Duke of Brittany's allegiance to the dual monarchy under the protectorate of Bedford was preserved through his abiding aim to preserve the independence of his duchy. Arthur de Richemont, a Breton nobleman, at first supported Henry V in the signing of the Treaty of Troyes, and he was created Count of Touraine by the English, but soon gave allegiance to Charles VII when Yolande of Aragon made him Constable of France. As the English were moving into Valois territory, relations with Brittany started to deteriorate in 1424 and when "open war" was declared the Estates-General took precautions against Breton raiders on the coast. Relations with Burgundy were much more important for English commerce.

Like Jean V, Philip also had other political wishes. One of his greatest concerns was Burgundian influence in the Low Countries. After Jacqueline of Hainault's flight to England in 1421 from her husband John of Brabant, she married Humphrey, Duke of Gloucester in 1423. This quickly caused English intervention in 1424 when Jacqueline's uncle and enemy made the Duke of Burgundy his heir. The outcome was Gloucester's disastrous campaign to Hainault. Bedford came to shore up the alliance on which his power depended.

Channel naval protection was not a concern, even after Burgundy switched its support at Arras. In the late 1420s, coastal areas like Devon and the Isle of Wight suffered some military engagements against Breton raiders. Bedford himself relied heavily on English financial aid to support his armies on the Norman frontiers. Local revenue from Normandy, Gascony and Calais was used for expected naval defence fortifications and garrisons in France.

== 1422–1429: English offensive ==
A dual monarchy gave Englishmen and northern Frenchmen alike the impetus to ensure complete suzerainty of France and to punish the treachery of Charles VII. In the 1420s, the English sent a small expeditionary force to France. As such, many English gentry were given French estates. The scheme was supported in 1417 during the conquest of upper Normandy during the reign of Henry V and was revived by Bedford. Most of Normandy, with the exception of Mont Saint-Michel, was stabilised. The Crotoy in the mouth of the Somme was also in Valois' hands, but was taken over by an English force, with Bedford's aid. Another expedition under the Duke of Exeter consisting of 1600 men (mostly archers) was sent to protect the Lancastrian-dominated part of France. Not only was most of Normandy cleared from the Armagnac French but there was also some attempts south of the Loire to endanger Charles VII's capital at Bourges.

The English strategy became more widespread while they swept across the Seine valley and Paris. The western border on Brittany was also strengthened. In 1424, Bedford made a bid in Paris at the Estates-General for an expeditionary force aimed to conquer Maine-Anjou and the Picardy region. It led to the Battle of Verneuil on the Maine–Normandy border. Bedford began to emerge as an English conqueror with a better reputation after his victory. It dealt also a stinging defeat against the Scots since they supported Charles VII and fought many causes in his name. Bedford's extensive conquests in Maine and towards the Loire meant that King Henry's French realm's capital was no longer in the front lines as long as the English remained in the offensive. Bedford assured the Norman population and made proclamations that the Normans would not suffer any colonial regime or financial hardship by taxation.

After Henry V's death in 1422, the duke of Bedford had intended on bringing the powerful duke of Brittany and Burgundy closer to the Lancastrian cause and confirm it in a treaty. In 1423, at the Treaty of Amiens, the three dukes, John VI of Brittany, John of Bedford and Philip the Good agreed on a triple alliance, lapsing on any of their deaths, which also recognised Henry VI as King of France and that they would work together to subjugate Charles the dauphin in the South. Overshadowing the Treaty of Troyes further, it arranged the marriage of Anna of Burgundy (Philip's sister) to John Duke of Bedford Regent of France. The two were married at Troyes cathedral, where Henry V was married to Catherine of Valois. The marriage, although primarily a political movement, evolved into a love match despite Anna being 15 years Bedford's senior.

The alliance of Amiens was almost completely undermined when Brittany and Burgundy held a conference the same year in which both parties agreed to be friends if either side ever reconciled with the dauphin. Although both Brittany and Burgundy acknowledged Henry VI of England as their sovereign, the friendly relations still remained between Brittany and Burgundy despite Burgundy breaking their agreements with the English at the Treaty of Arras.

By 1424, French estates were sold widely from noble to commoner, and by both English and French. In 1417, English settlers had arrived to purchase estates in coastal cities like Cherbourg, Caen and Harfleur. However, for matters of security of English-controlled France, the English soldiers were valued highest for the disposal of French estates. As much as the conquests seemed realistic in a complete France, enthusiasm started to wane. After Gloucester's invasion of Holland in 1424 to enforce the rights of his wife, Jacqueline of Hainault, Anglo-Burgundian relations began to become strained. In addition, Brittany under Duke Jean V lost interest, and his negotiations with Charles VII were used to weaken the western military frontier on Brittany. In 1428, the Scots continued to support Charles, and when Anglo-Scottish relations deteriorated completely, French envoys were sent to Scotland for an alliance and a proposal that King James I of Scotland's daughter would marry Charles' son Louis.

The military of Normandy now depended on three men, Bedford, Warwick and Suffolk. Warwick landed in France in 1426 to protect Cherbourg, threatened by Breton raids. In 1427, Brittany was forced again to be a Vassal after 1 year of fighting against the English. After Verneuil, there was less need for a civil administration. The defence and garrisons slowly passed to the keeping of the civilians after Bedford and his host left for England in 1427 left. The same year, there was another draw for an invasion further in towards the Anjou region. Local French forces subject to their King Henri II of France however were neglected of military duty and the English soldier again was favoured by the Estates-General to carry out the offensive. This decision was made during the absence of Bedford, who had already left for England.

Orléans was the last jewel for the Armagnacs. The Earl of Salisbury began the siege in 1428 with 2400 men in addition to Burgundian allies who joined the siege. Salisbury's death at the start of the siege destroyed the Anglo-Burgundian morale. The French revived with Jeanne d'Arc's arrival, and it was the turning point of the war. She lifted the siege and Charles VII was consecrated in Rheims, the traditional crowning place for French kings. It was reported with great gravity in Westminster and the coronation of Henry VI as king of France in Paris could be the sole propaganda weapon against Charles. The crusade assembled by Beaufort against the Bohemians was quickly diverted to France. Beaufort could not afford to anger Pope Martin V by denying the crusade, however the defeat at Patay could not have been ignored. The events at the Loire brought the English-French military scheme to its test.

== Two coronations (1429–1431) ==
Henry VI experienced two coronations: the first at Westminster Abbey in England, on 6 November 1429, and the second at Notre-Dame in Paris, on 16 December 1431. The coronation in England was in response to the collapse of the Siege of Orléans and was a move recommended by Henry's English and French advisers. His English coronation had already been postponed for seven years, and John of Lancaster, 1st Duke of Bedford, was the one to suggest the idea of his French coronation in Paris, as there was no reason to further postpone his coronation until he came of age. Deeply shocked by the Valois success in having Charles VII crowned King of France in Reims, the traditional altar for the consecration of French kings, Bedford believed that Henry VI's coronation in Paris would cancel the victory of Joan of Arc, and he quickly arranged it. Charles' coronation in Reims, on 16 July 1429, was an act of symbolic significance compared to the English position in the 1420s. However, by the end of 1427, the French and the English were quarrelling over strategic military plans to gain the upper hand in conquering France. The States-General in Paris announced that the provinces adjacent to the east and south of Normandy were assigned to Philip the Good and so allowed Bedford to concentrate in Normandy. Some Englishmen who feared an English government in France were opposed to the idea of Henry's being crowned in France before his coronation in England.

During Henry's coronation as king of England in 1429, poems by John Lydgate were read to stress further Henry's dual inheritance of England and France. A direct link was made between Henry and his grandfather, Charles VI. The painted pedigree paralleled Henry's descent through his mother, Catherine of Valois, from Saint Louis, and his descent on his father's side from another saint, Edward the Confessor. This was not mentioned in John Lydgate's poem, no doubt because it was largely a translation from a French work. But in another poem written for the king's coronation on 6 November 1429 Henry's descent from both these saints was mentioned.

Your Father which did all shine in all virtue ... with the good life of Queen Catherine, your blessed Mother ... of Good roots, springing from virtue must grow good fruit by necessity.

There was also a mention of the king's descent from Clovis, to whom God had sent an angel, to secure for Henry of France and England the fleur-de-lys and to signify perfect religious belief and the steadfast unity of the three persons of the Trinity. The actual anointing and coronation were performed by Cardinal Beaufort, Bishop of Winchester, a natural son of John of Gaunt.

France in 1428. Paris was centred in the Anglo-Burgundian-controlled region. Reims lies to the northeast of this area.

On 23 April 1430, Henry embarked from Dover for France in company with Cardinal Beaufort, the Duke of Bedford and the bishops of Thérouanne, Norwich, Beauvais and Évreux. On 16 December 1431, on the way to his French coronation in Paris, Henry travelled to the Basilica of St Denis, a hallowed burial place for French kings on the outskirts of Paris. Two days earlier, the coronation was carefully set to be held at the cathedral of Notre-Dame, on the first Sunday in Advent, which was the traditional day for a king of France to proceed to the cathedral, this being a symbolic parallel with the progress of the King of Heaven. Henry was preceded by twenty-five trumpeters and a guard of between two and three thousand men. The royal party's route took the usual ceremonial entry into Paris from the north.

With trumpets sounding and fleurs-de-lys flying, the procession proceeded over the Seine bridge to the Île de la Cité, where the young French King kissed the Holy Relics at the Sainte Chapelle. The route traversed to the western part of Île de la Cité carefully missing the Cathedral and then moved east to the Hôtel des Tournelles where Anne of Burgundy and the Duke of Bedford awaited their royal nephew. The following day, the King waited to the east of the city for his coronation. Preparation was done for the hallowing at Notre-Dame, and the gold draperies were taken down until the coronation day. The newly anointed and crowned sovereign would be seated on a great raised dais. Stairs were covered by azure cloth sewn with fleurs-de-lys from the top of the structure down. The English Chapel Royal choir joined the choir of the cathedral of Paris, who sang their traditional polyphonic music during the coronation. Cardinal Beaufort did the actual crowning, which was traditionally an office to be performed by the bishop of Paris, who was further shocked that Beaufort also celebrated part of the Holy Mass service at the chapel, another office which properly belonged to him. The coronation had very important orchestration, seeking to present again the dual-lineage of Henry, and a French play called tableau of Châtelet: a boy clothed in gold fleurs-de-lys, representing the king of England and France, was balancing the two crowns on his head with actors representing the duke of Burgundy and his son, the count of Nevers, offering him the shields of France, and other actors playing Anne of Burgundy and the Duke of Bedford as offering him the Lion Rampant of England. As a blight on the occasion, Philip, Duke of Burgundy, never in fact met his acknowledged sovereign at any time during his expedition to France from 1430 to 1432, since Philip was in Lille in connection with his newly established Order of the Golden Fleece.

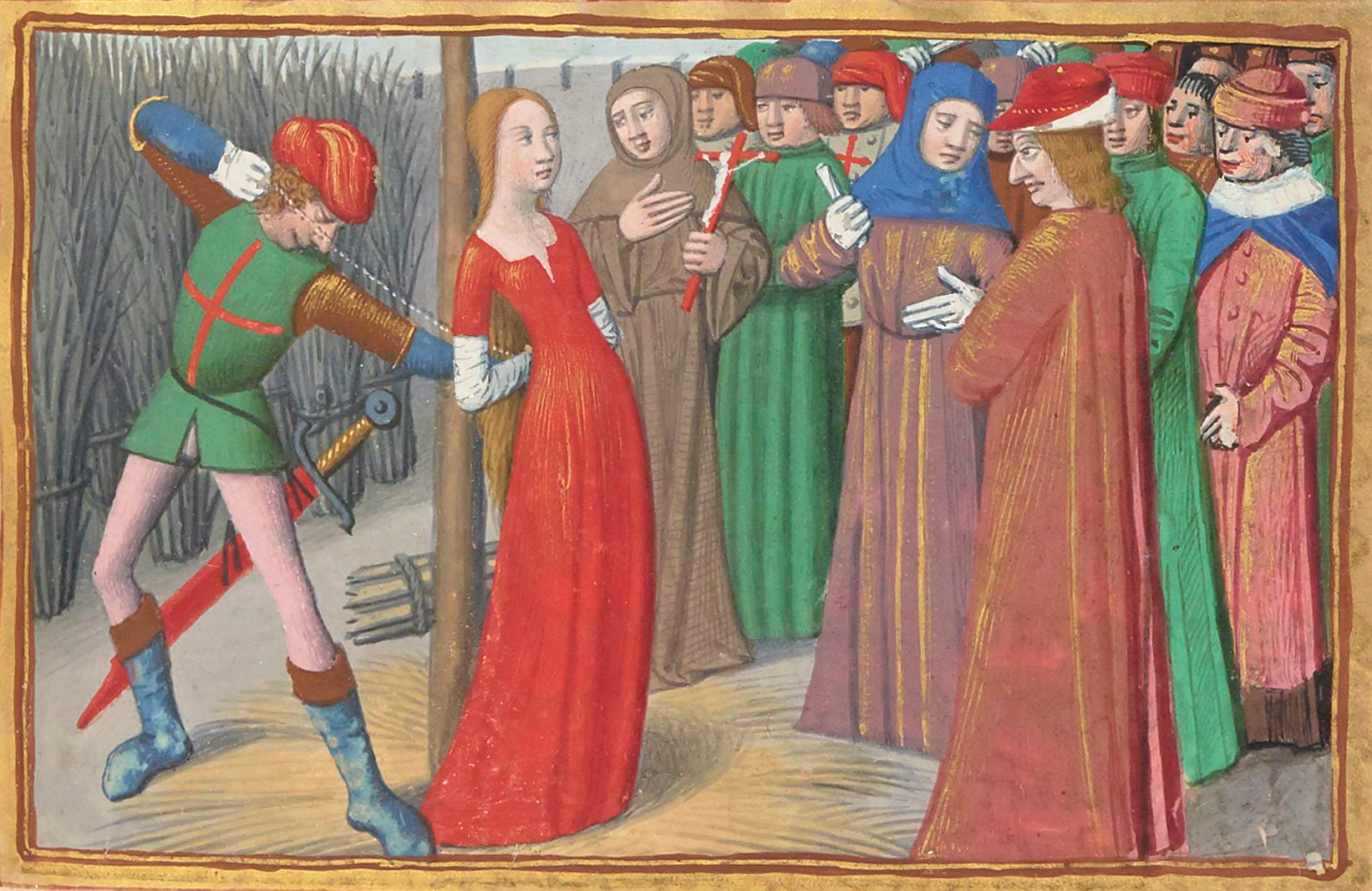
Miniature of Joan's Execution from The Vigils of King Charles VII, anonymous (c. 1484, Bibliothèque nationale de France)

Apart from its splendour and glory, the coronation ultimately achieved little. England's suspicions of Burgundy had become marked concerning the actual military position, as it was discovered three days before the coronation that Philip had made a six-day general truce with Charles VII. The coronation was principally an English affair, dominated by Beaufort, some English bishops, and some Anglophile French bishops. The coronation had not offered resistance to the Valois-French pressing at the borders, with the English losing mile after mile of territory. Henry, with little to show for his two-year stay in his French kingdom, returned to England by way of Calais and never stepped on his French kingdom again. In 1432, Henry Chichele, Archbishop of Canterbury, stated that Henry's stay had not achieved its desired effect but had instead shown that English power in Normandy was weakening. Bedford himself was then mourning the death of his wife, Anne of Burgundy, and collapsed from exhaustion after news of more territory being lost to Charles VII. Five months later, Bedford married Jacquetta of Luxembourg, who came from a family distrusted by Philip the Good's Anglo-Burgundian forces, and thus Bedford and Philip lost the link they had with each other through Anne of Burgundy, who had been the primary mediator between the two. The last three years saw England struggle to maintain its military commitment to the war, and Philip was finding the war too costly on his part.

== See also ==
- English claims to the French throne
- Franco-British Union
