= L'Isle-Adam, Val-d'Oise =

L'Isle-Adam
- Commune
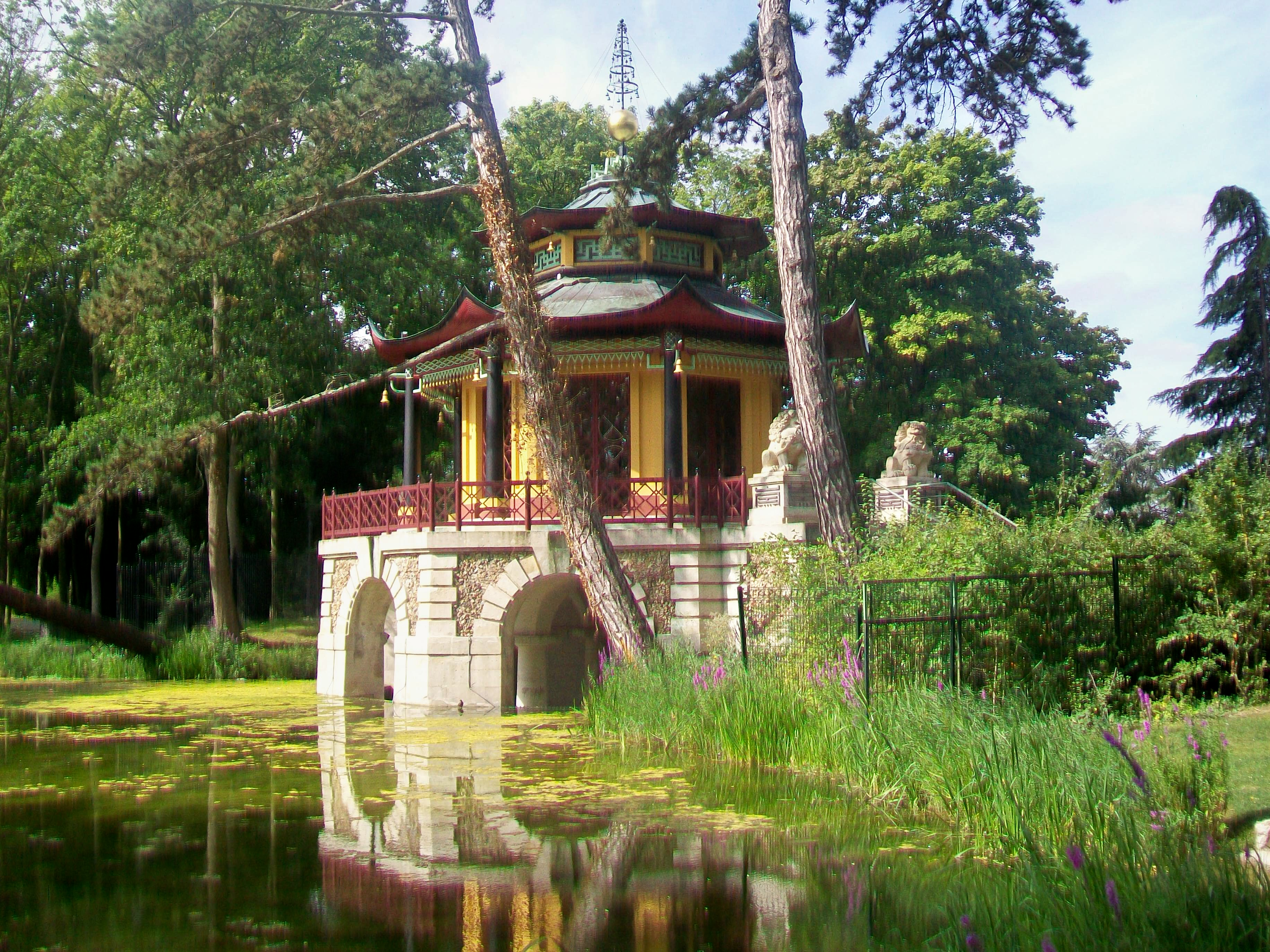
- The Cassan Chinese Pavilion, in L'Isle-Adam

- Coat of arms
- Location of L'Isle-Adam
- Location within France Location within Île-de-France (region)
- Coordinates: 49°06′43″N 2°13′25″E
- Country: France
- Region: Île-de-France
- Department: Val-d'Oise
- Arrondissement: Pontoise
- Canton: L'Isle-Adam
- Intercommunality: Vallée de l'Oise et des Trois forêts

Government
  - Mayor (2020–2026): Sébastien Poniatowski
- Area^{1}: 14.94 km^{2} (5.77 sq mi)
- Elevation: 70 m (230 ft)
- Highest elevation: 117 m (384 ft)
- Lowest elevation: 23 m (75 ft)
- Population (2023): 12,493
  - Density: 836.2/km^{2} (2,166/sq mi)
- Time zone: UTC+01:00 (CET)
  - Summer (DST): UTC+02:00 (CEST)
- INSEE/Postal code: 95313 /95290
- ^{1} French Land Register data, which excludes lakes, ponds, glaciers > 1 km^{2} (0.386 sq mi or 247 acres) and river estuaries.

L'Isle-Adam (French pronunciation: [lil adɑ̃]) is a commune in the Val-d'Oise department in Île-de-France in northern France. The small town beside the river Oise has a long sandy beach and attracts visitors from Paris.

== Geography ==
L'Isle-Adam is a commune and town in north central Val-d'Oise. It is located on the left bank of the River Oise immediately opposite the town of Parmain which is on the right bank, about 25 kilometres (16 mi) northwest of Paris, 12 kilometres (7 mi) north of Pontoise and 35 kilometres (22 mi) south of Beauvais. It is on the northern fringe of the urban area of Paris, near the Regional Natural Park of French Vexin.

The Oise borders the town on its north and west sides, and the town is partially built on three islands, the Ile du Prieuré, the Ile de la Cohue and the Ile de la Dérivation, by which there is a dam and lock. Several small streams flow through the town and there are also ponds and small lakes in the vicinity. The town is liable to flooding when the river rises, and nowhere in the commune is higher than 117 metres (384 ft) above sea level, the river being at 23 metres (75 ft) above sea level. A bridge carrying RD 64 connects L'Isle-Adam with Parmain. L'Isle-Adam–Parmain station has rail connections to Persan, Creil, Pontoise and Paris.

== Population ==
Historical population
Year	Pop.	±% p.a.
1968	6,920	—
1975	9,971	+5.36%
1982	9,479	−0.72%
1990	9,979	+0.64%
1999	11,163	+1.25%
2007	11,466	+0.34%
2012	11,918	+0.78%
2017	12,057	+0.23%
2023	12,493	+0.59%
Source: INSEE

== Tourism ==
L'Isle-Adam has several historic sites and was the haunt of impressionist painters such as Charles-François Daubigny and Jean Droit. Saint-Martin's Church is noteworthy as well as the Château de Stors and its chapel. The Château was damaged in World War II and afterwards abandoned, but is being renovated. It is surrounded by terraced gardens and parkland at the edge of the national forest known as the "Forêt de L'Isle-Adam". In the Parc de Cassan, there are a pair of unusual eighteenth century Chinese pavilions, each with a hexagonal plan and a pagoda-shaped roof.

L'Isle-Adam has a long sandy beach beside the river and attracts Parisian families during the summer. The city has a swimming pool, facilities for tennis, canoeing, rowing, and a children's playground. The city's new pier (380 new homes) was inaugurated in 2020, but developed slowly due to the pandemic.

Places of importance include the Église (church) Saint-Martin, the pavillon chinois (Chinese pavilion) de Cassan, the Domaine de Stors, the Maison du gardien de la plage (House of the beach keeper), the Château de L'Isle-Adam, the Dolmen de la pierre plate (flat rock dolmen), and the Pavillon du jardin (gaden pavilion) de Cassan.

== Personalities ==
- Aimée Antoinette Camus – botanist
- Jean Droit - Artist

== See also ==
- Château de L'Isle-Adam
- Communes of the Val-d'Oise department
