= Porte Saint-Honoré =

City gate in Paris

Coordinates: 48.8682°N 2.3238°E

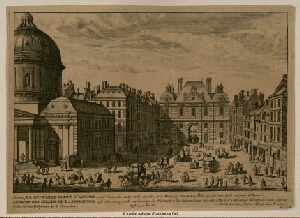
The third gate of this name, built in 1635 (engraving by Adam Pérelle).

The Porte Saint-Honoré was a city gate in Paris. It was the main entry point into the city from the west, towards Saint-Germain-en-Laye (with the Porte Saint-Denis to the north towards Saint-Denis, the Porte Saint-Antoine to the east towards Vincennes, and the Porte Saint-Jacques to the south towards Orléans). There were three gates that bore the name, demolished rebuilt further and further along the Rue Saint-Honoré as the city expanded - they dated to the early 13th, late 14th and early 17th centuries.

== Bibliography ==
- Jacques Hillairet, Connaissance du vieux Paris : rive droite, rive gauche, les îles & les villages, Paris, éditions Payot & Rivages, 1993 (1re éd. 1956), 3 t. en 1 vol., 377-299-255 p. (ISBN 978-2-86930-648-6).
- Renaud Gagneux and Denis Prouvost, Sur les traces des enceintes de Paris : promenade au long des murs disparus, Paris, éditions Parigramme, 2004, 246 p. (ISBN 2-84096-322-1).
