= Treaty of Troyes =

1420 treaty between England and France

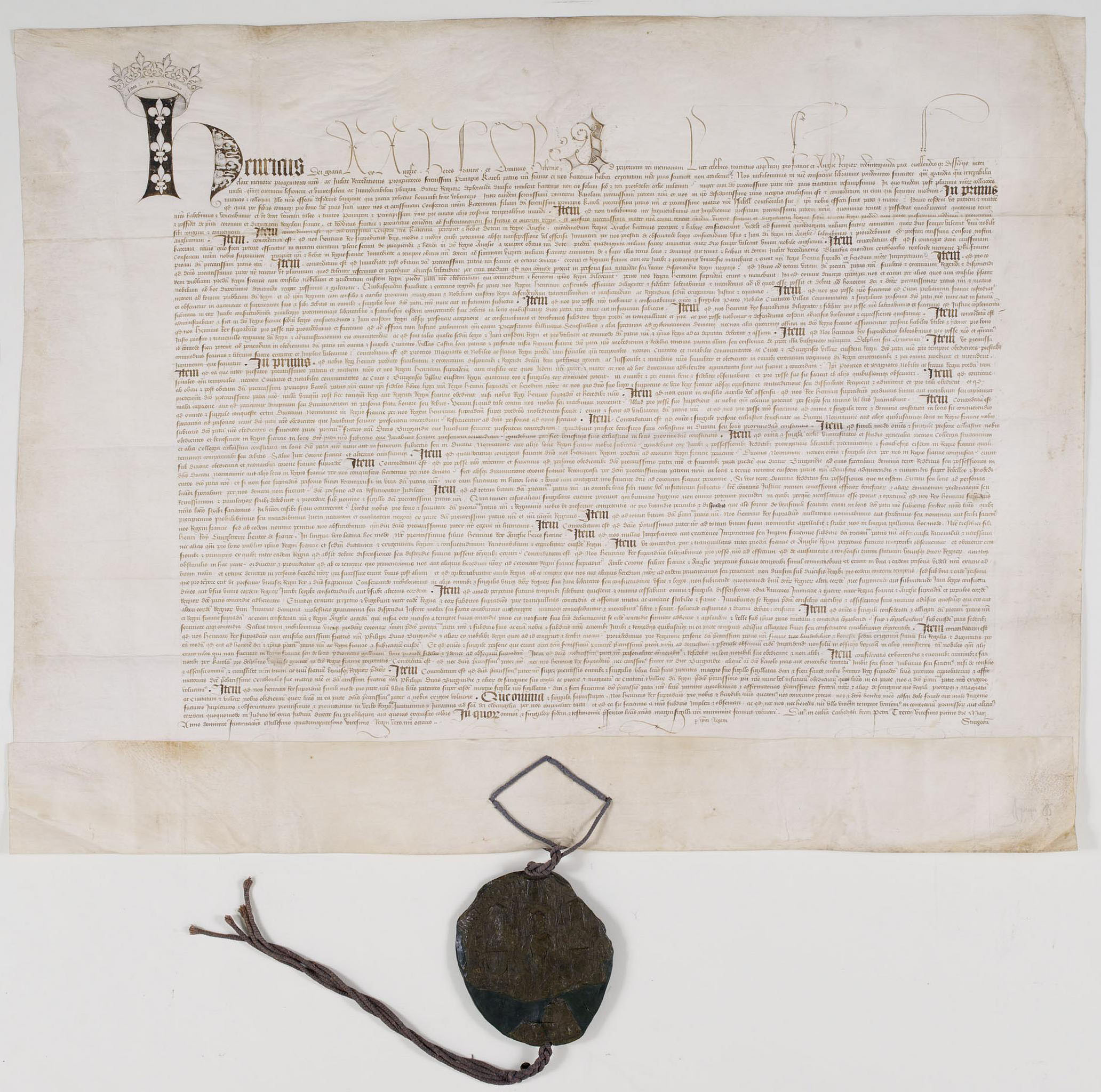
- Sealed copy of the Treaty of Troyes
- Type: Peace and succession treaty
- Signed: 21 May 1420
- Location: Troyes Cathedral, Troyes
- Parties: Kingdom of France; Kingdom of England
- Ratifiers: Estates General of France (December 1420); Parliament of England (1421)
- Languages: French; Latin

The Treaty of Troyes was an agreement sealed in the French city of Troyes on 21 May 1420, under which Henry V of England and his heirs were to succeed Charles VI of France on the French throne. The treaty is regarded as the culmination of Henry's achievements in the Hundred Years' War, and it gave him a far better prospect of the French crown than any of his predecessors. It followed Henry's conquest of Normandy and the murder of John the Fearless, Duke of Burgundy, and it disinherited Charles's son, the Dauphin Charles. Under its terms, Charles VI remained king for life, while Henry married his daughter Catherine of Valois, was styled "heir of France", and took over the government of the kingdom. Once Henry or his heirs succeeded, the crowns of England and France were to be held by one person, with each kingdom keeping its own laws. The treaty left it deliberately unclear whether Henry's right derived from the long-standing English claim to the French throne or from Charles VI's own authority, and its validity was contested in France from the outset.

Both kings died in 1422, and the infant Henry VI became king of England and, under the treaty, of France. The Dauphin, however, also claimed the throne as Charles VII, and the envisioned dual monarchy crumbled in the later stages of the Hundred Years' War. The treaty was never formally rescinded, and English and British monarchs used the title of king of France until 1801.

== Background ==
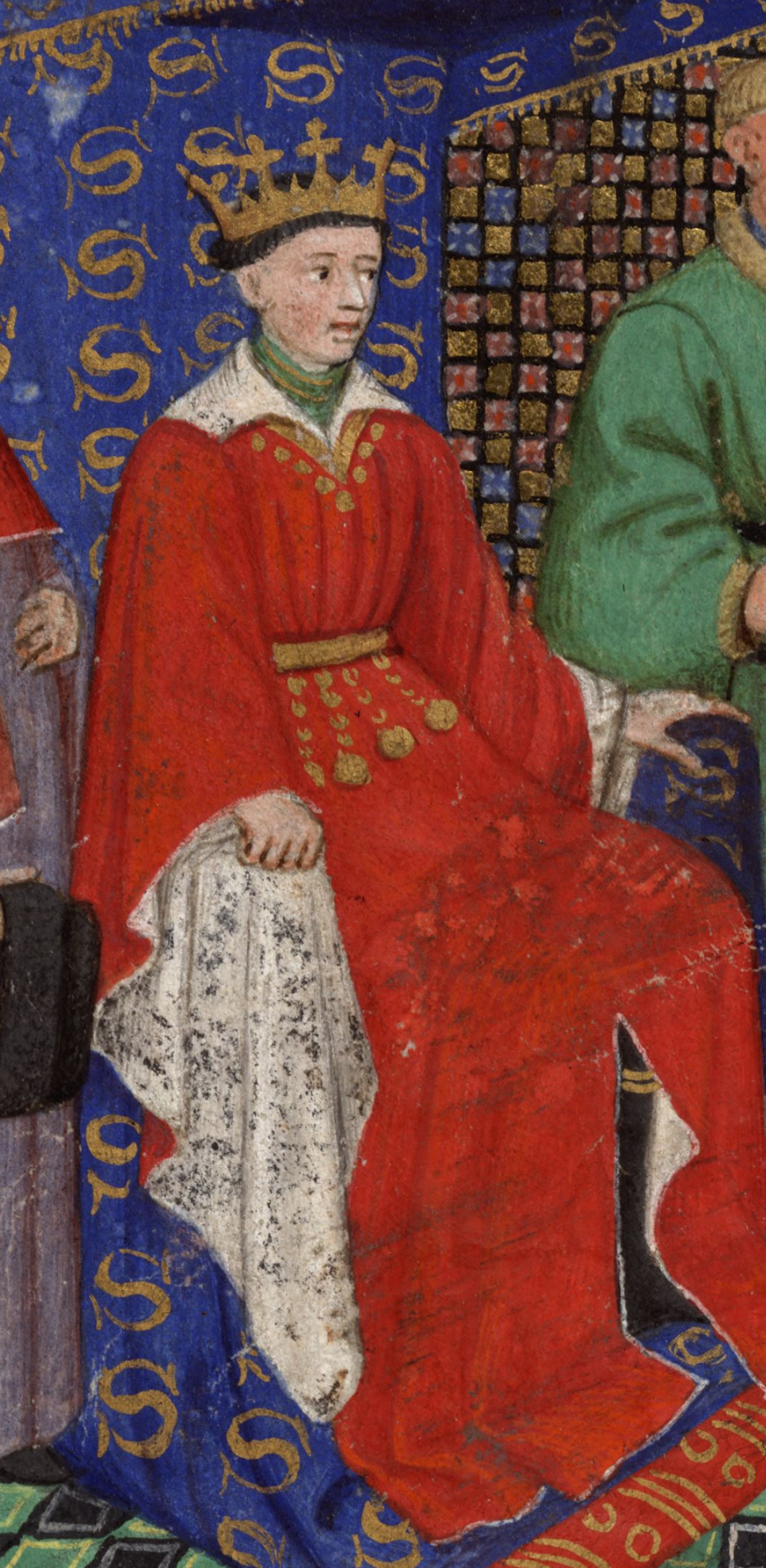
Miniature of Henry around the signing of the Treaty, c.1420 (CCCC MS 213)

English kings had claimed the French throne since Edward III assumed the title in 1340, on the grounds that, as the nephew of Charles IV through his mother, he was the late king's closest relative. Edward gave up the title at the Treaty of Brétigny in 1360 in exchange for territory, but resumed it in 1369, and it was under that title that Henry V invaded France in 1415 and again in 1417. French resistance was weakened by the condition of Charles VI, who suffered bouts of mental illness from 1392 onwards. He was never wholly incapable of ruling, but his intermittent incapacity encouraged members of the royal family to compete for control of government. That rivalry culminated in the murder of the king's brother, Louis, Duke of Orléans, on the orders of John the Fearless, Duke of Burgundy, in 1407, and left a lasting division between the Burgundians and the Orléanists, later known as Armagnacs.

From August 1417, Henry set out to conquer Normandy. By the time Rouen fell early in 1419, Paris had been under Burgundian control since May 1418, and both French factions were negotiating with him. At a conference near Meulan in May and June 1419, attended by Charles's daughter Catherine but not by the king (who was said to be ill), Henry's envoys demanded the territories ceded under the Treaty of Brétigny together with Normandy, all in full sovereignty. In return, Henry was prepared to renounce his claim to the French throne. The talks collapsed when John the Fearless failed to attend a further meeting on 3 July, and on 11 July he publicly reconciled with the Dauphin Charles at Pouilly-le-Fort. Henry responded by seizing Pontoise at the end of July, bringing English forces to the gates of Paris and prompting the French court to withdraw to Troyes.

== Negotiations ==
On 10 September 1419, the Dauphin and John the Fearless met on the bridge at Montereau to concert their action against the English, when John was assassinated by one of the Dauphin's attendants. Whether the killing was premeditated is uncertain, but the Dauphin was held responsible. The murder drove the Burgundians, now led by John's son Philip the Good, into alliance with Henry. On 27 September, Henry's envoys told the royal council in Paris that he would no longer settle for Normandy but sought the crown of France, and proposed that the two kingdoms, though sharing a king, should remain separate. When the council objected that this was not what Henry had asked for in July, the reply was that things were now different. According to historian Anne Curry, Henry was the originator of the terms later codified in the treaty. This marked a break with earlier English diplomacy: Brétigny had settled a territorial dispute and set the claim to the throne aside, whereas Troyes was to be a dynastic settlement imposed by the English.

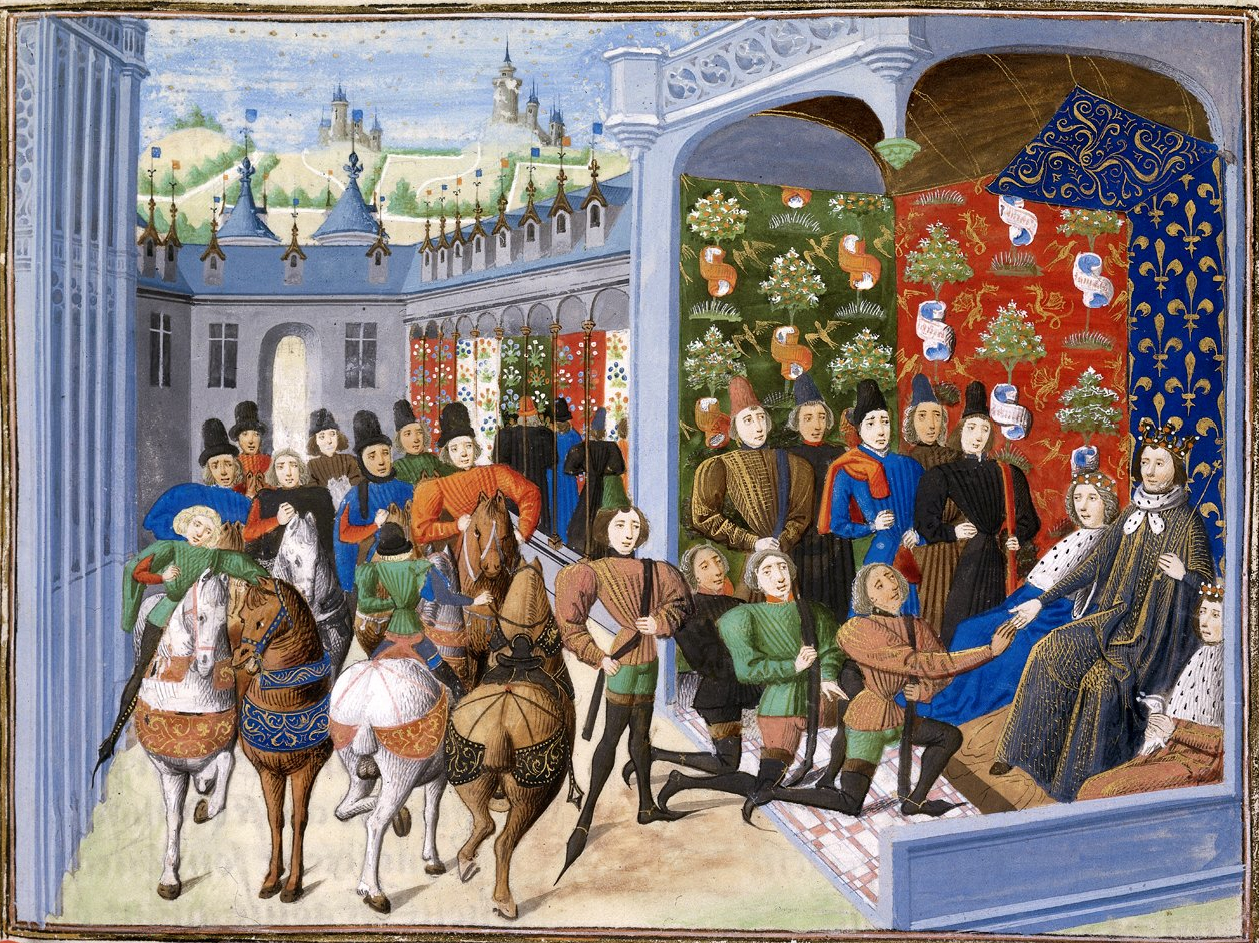
Charles VI of France and Isabeau of Bavaria at the Treaty of Troyes

After debate in his council at Arras, Philip issued letters on 2 December 1419 accepting that, after Charles VI's death, the crown would pass to Henry and his heirs; for Philip, revenge for his father's murder was paramount. Henry confirmed the agreement by letters patent issued at Rouen on Christmas Day, the day after a general truce had been proclaimed. Henry's agent Louis Robessart was sent to Troyes to win over Charles VI and Queen Isabeau, and Philip joined the court there on 23 March 1420. Articles were agreed on 9 April and, after Henry had some terms amended, a final text was settled on 5 May. Henry reached Troyes on 20 May, and the next day the treaty was formally sealed in Troyes Cathedral. Charles VI was too ill to attend; Isabeau and Philip, who had been empowered on 19 May to act for him, took part in his place. Henry confirmed the treaty with the seal Edward III had used at the negotiations for Brétigny, and was then betrothed to Catherine.

== Terms ==
The treaty was issued in the name of Charles VI, although its terms had largely been dictated by Henry. Charles was to remain king for the rest of his life, but on his death the crown and realm of France were to pass to Henry and his heirs in perpetuity. From then on, the two crowns would always be held by the same person, while each kingdom kept its own laws and customs and neither was made subject to the other. The wording allowed for an heir general, so that if Henry died without children the French crown would pass to his brothers.

Until Charles's death, Henry was to give up the title of king of France, which he had used since his accession, and be styled "heir of France" instead. Because of Charles's incapacity, the government of France was vested in Henry, to be exercised with the counsel of the French nobility. Henry also committed himself to respecting French institutions, laws, and customs. The treaty did not formally name Henry regent, but within weeks he was styling himself "heir and regent of France". Normandy – by then almost entirely under English occupation – was to remain his until he became king, when it would revert to the French crown.

The treaty proclaimed perpetual peace between England and France. Henry's marriage to Catherine of Valois made him the son-in-law of Charles and Isabeau, but the treaty avoided presenting the marriage as the source of his heirship; the wedding itself took place on 2 June 1420, twelve days after the sealing. The disinherited Dauphin was referred to only as "Charles, calling himself dauphin of Viennois". Henry undertook to bring the regions loyal to him into obedience, and no party was to negotiate with the Dauphin without the consent of the others.

== Ratification ==
The Conclusion of the Treaty of Troyes, engraved by Francesco Bartolozzi, after William Hamilton (1788)

The day after the sealing, the first president of the Parlement of Paris, the bishop of Troyes, local officials and some 1,500 inhabitants of the town swore to observe the treaty, and its terms were proclaimed in France and sent to England. Henry and Charles made a ceremonial entry into Paris together on 1 December 1420, with Philip the Good riding alongside in mourning for his father. The Estates General met in Paris on 6 December in the presence of both kings to hear the treaty read, and on 10 December approved it as a public law of the kingdom, although the assembly represented only those parts of France willing to accept it. At a lit de justice on 23 December, the Dauphin was summoned to answer for the murder of John the Fearless. When he failed to appear, he was sentenced to banishment and declared incapable of succeeding to the throne, and in January 1421 he was formally deprived of his lands and titles.

In England, the parliament that met in December 1420, while Henry was still in France, showed unease about the new arrangement. The Commons secured confirmation of a statute of 1340 providing that the English would never be subject to the king of England in his capacity as king of France, but other petitions intended to limit the king's authority during his absence were turned aside. The treaty was not put to Parliament for ratification until Henry had returned to England. In May 1421 the Commons declared it "worthy, necessary and useful" to both kingdoms and to all Christendom.

== Legal questions ==
The treaty had to overcome two obstacles to Henry's succession: the established rule that the French crown could not pass to or through a woman, and the existence of a legitimate son of Charles VI. The treaty based Henry's right on Charles's own authority as king, leaving him on the throne for life and making no mention of the Plantagenet claim inherited from Edward III. Historian Maurice Keen reads this omission as a major concession from the English point of view, while Curry argues that the wording was deliberately vague: by calling Henry "heir of France" from the preamble onwards, the treaty implicitly acknowledged the English claim without the French having to admit that they had followed the wrong kings for eighty years. The treaty also excluded not only the Dauphin but every other prince of the Valois line, including the next male heir, Charles I, Duke of Orléans, a prisoner in England since the Battle of Agincourt, on whom Henry ordered a closer watch during the negotiations.

The treaty's validity was questioned in France from the outset. Its opponents held that a king could neither disinherit his own son nor alienate the kingdom, since the crown had to pass by hereditary succession, a principle the French monarchy observed for the rest of the ancien régime. Charles VI's illness raised further doubts about his capacity to make such a settlement. Partly for these reasons, the treaty did not rely on the king's authority alone. It required ratification by the estates of both kingdoms and individual oaths from French lords, communities and subjects, which made anyone who broke it a perjurer and a traitor.

== Aftermath ==
Henry V died on 31 August 1422, less than two months before Charles VI, and so never became king of France. His infant son, Henry VI, succeeded to the English throne and, on Charles's death on 22 October, became king of France under the terms of the treaty. The Dauphin also claimed the throne as Charles VII, ruling the parts of France that rejected the treaty from his base at Bourges. After a series of French military successes, Charles VII was crowned at Reims on 17 July 1429. The English responded by crowning Henry VI king of France at Notre-Dame de Paris on 16 December 1431, grounding his French kingship in the treaty.

Philip the Good eventually broke with the English in 1435 in the Treaty of Arras. To do so, he needed a papal legate to release him from his oath to the Treaty of Troyes, while legal scholars argued that the Dauphin had been bound to inherit the kingdom ever since receiving the Dauphiné in 1417. However, the treaty was never formally rescinded, and English and later British monarchs went on styling themselves kings of France until the title was finally abandoned in 1801 by George III in the Acts of Union.

The treaty has long been seen as the crowning achievement of Henry V's campaign for the French throne, and Curry notes that it gave him a far better chance of the crown than his predecessors, since his right had been accepted by the man the French recognised as their king. Historians differ, however, on how workable the treaty was. Keen notes that it took the Burgundians fifteen years to find legal grounds for abandoning it, which shows the care with which it had been drafted. Gerald Harriss argues it was a blueprint for a different order, not one that had already been achieved, since Henry's acceptance as king of France depended on the removal of the Dauphin. French historian Philippe Contamine regards the treaty as unworkable from the start, both because Charles VI's instability robbed it of value and because it committed Henry to war against a fully functioning rival government under the Dauphin.

== Sources ==
- Allmand, C. T. (1985). "Henry V the Soldier, and the War in France". In Harriss, G. L. (ed.). Henry V: The Practice of Kingship. Oxford: Oxford University Press. pp. 117–135. ISBN 978-0-19-873080-4.
- Allmand, Christopher (1992). Henry V. London: Methuen. ISBN 978-0-413-53280-0.
- Curry, Anne (2008). "Two Kingdoms, One King: The Treaty of Troyes (1420) and the Creation of a Double Monarchy of England and France" (PDF). In Richardson, Glenn (ed.). The Contending Kingdoms: France and England 1420–1700. Farnham: Ashgate. pp. 23–41. ISBN 978-0-7546-5789-7.
- Curry, Anne (2006) [2005]. Agincourt: A New History (Paperback ed.). Stroud: Tempus. ISBN 978-0-7524-3813-9.
- Curry, Anne (2015). Henry V: Playboy Prince to Warrior King. Penguin Monarchs. London: Allen Lane. ISBN 978-0-14-197871-0.
- Duparc, Pierre (1971). "La conclusion du traité de Troyes". Revue historique de droit français et étranger. 4th series (in French). 49 (1): 50–64. JSTOR 43850430.
- Harriss, G. L. (1985). "Conclusion". In Harriss, G. L. (ed.). Henry V: The Practice of Kingship. Oxford: Oxford University Press. pp. 201–210. ISBN 978-0-19-873080-4.
- Jacob, E. F. (1942). "The Collapse of France in 1419–20". Bulletin of the John Rylands Library. 26: 307–326.
- Keen, Maurice (1985). "Diplomacy". In Harriss, G. L. (ed.). Henry V: The Practice of Kingship. Oxford: Oxford University Press. pp. 181–199. ISBN 978-0-19-873080-4.
- Matusiak, John (2012). Henry V. Routledge Historical Biographies. Routledge. ISBN 978-0-415-62027-7.
- Sumption, Jonathan (2025). The Hundred Years War. Vol. 5: Triumph and Illusion. Faber & Faber. ISBN 978-0-571-27459-8.
