= Château de L'Isle-Adam =

Château in Val-d'Oise, France

Coordinates: 49.1143°N 2.2108°E

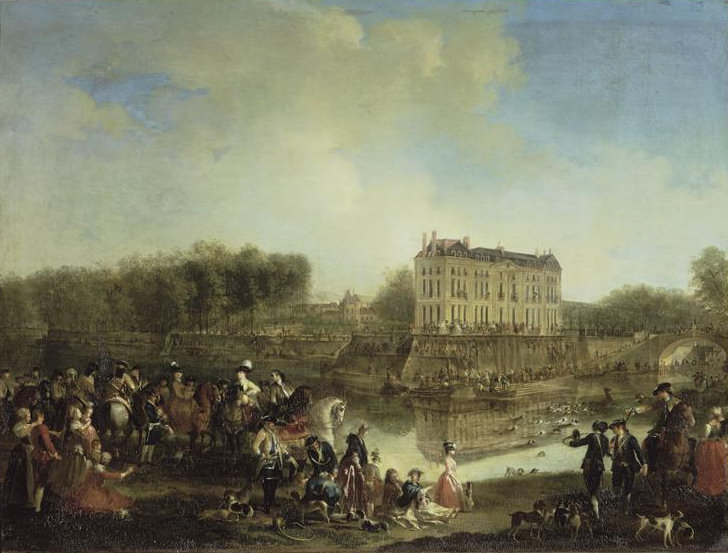
'Michel Barthélemy Ollivier, Fête give by le Prince Louis François de Conti in honour of Charles William Ferdinand, Hereditary Prince of Brunswick-Lüneburg in 1766 : the deer take the water in front of the château.

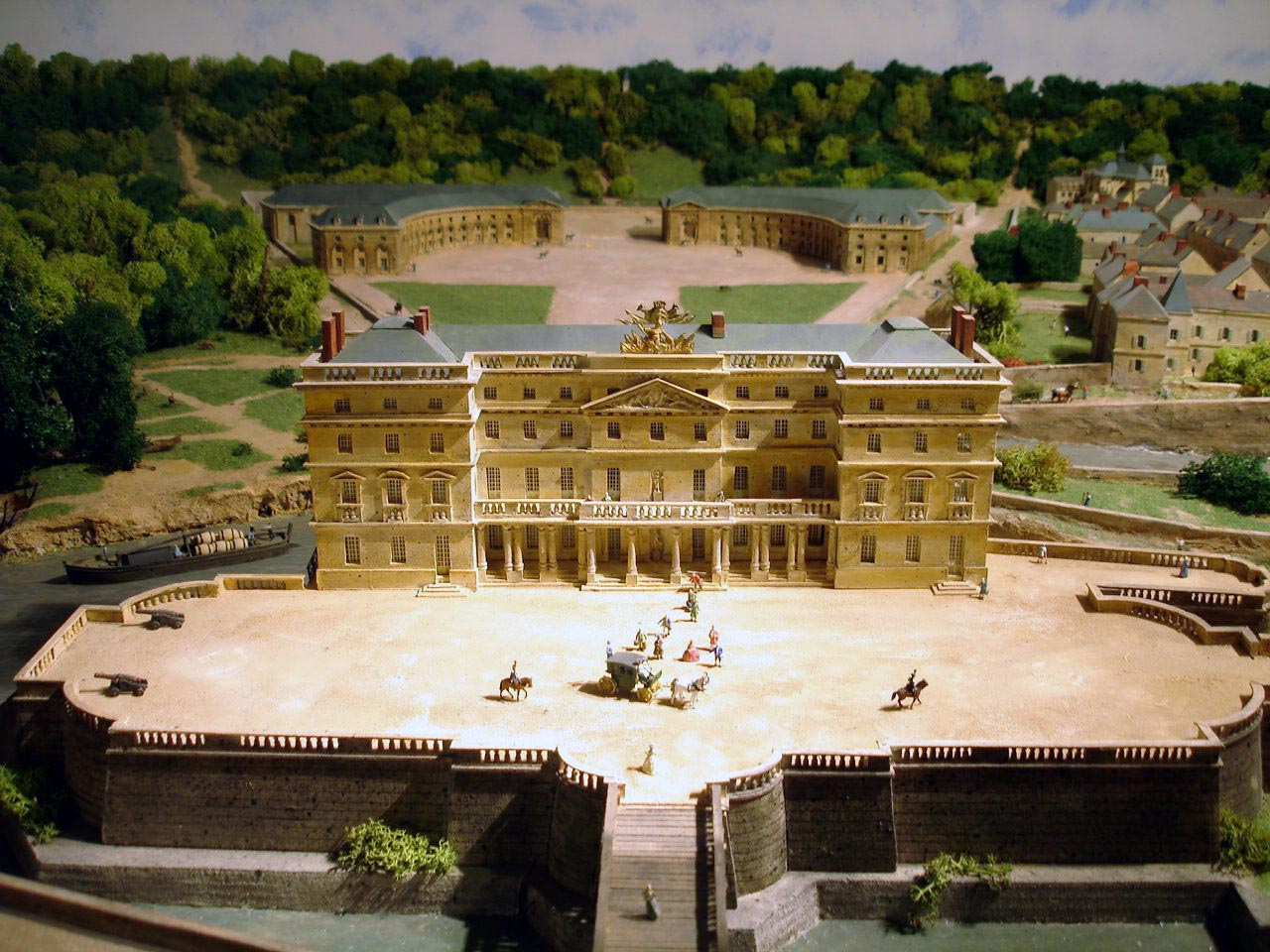
Maquette du chateau de Conti

The Château de L'Isle-Adam, now destroyed, could be found in the town of L'Isle-Adam in the department of Val-d'Oise; it was built on an island called the Île du Prieuré The building was connected with many illustrious families; the Lords of Adams, the Dukes of Villiers, the Dukes of Montmorency, the Princes of Condé and finally the Princes of Conti. It was under the Princes of Conti that the building had its golden age. They lived there for seven generations and it was their principal residence outside Paris. Their Parisian home was the Hôtel de Conti. It was entirely destroyed by the 19th century. L'Isle Adam is situated on a series of three isles

== History ==
To stop invasion by the Normans, the King of France ordered the construction of a series of fortresses in order to defend his lands from his enemy. The first series of buildings on the site were in fact constructed in 825 along the two islands in L'Isle-Adam bordering the River Oise near where the present town of Nogent is today. The latter was not recorded until 1069 but was near the site.

The château was given to one Seigneur Adam, literally "Lord Adam". From then on, the château was known as château de L'Isle-Adam. Around the château the town of L'Isle Adam grew and eventually met Nogent which was later swallowed by L'Isle Adam. By the Middle Ages, the Lordship grew and included the properties of Parmain and Valmondois. Over this period the château increased in size and was remodelled according to contemporary tastes. The Île du Prieuré, or "Isle of the Priory", was first built on by Saint Chrodegand in 1014. The Île du Prieuré was where the château was built on.

=== L'Isle-Adam before the Conti ===
L'Isle Adam lived quietly until 1360 when it was sold to Pierre Villiers, the Grand Master of the Kings household. It was later the property of his descendant who took the style of Philippe Villiers de L'Isle-Adam. Philippe (1464–1534) was a prominent member of the Knights Hospitaller at Rhodes and later Malta. Having risen to the position of Prior of the Langue of Auvergne, he was elected Grand Master of the Order in 1521. In turn, Philippe's descendant Antoine Villiers de L'Isle-Adam, heir to the domain married Marguerite de Montmorency, a member of the Montmorency family who were created Dukes in the reign of Henry II of France.

By this marriage, L'Isle-Adam was gained by the Montmorency family. In September 1527, the son of Antoine Villiers de L'Isle-Adam, Charles, bought the rights of purchase from all his siblings to stop the breakup of the estate. He gave it to Anne de Montmorency - Honorary Knight of the Garter, soldier, statesman, diplomat, Marshal of France and then Constable of France - who rebuilt the château, and a mill which was situated on the bridge.

Later on, Anne's grandson Henri de Montmorency was executed on the command of Louis XIII, having been part of a conspiracy with Gaston d'Orléans. Executed in Toulouse, Henri had all his property confiscated from him and this included L'Isle Adam. Despite this, Louis XIII allowed the family properties to be returned to various members of the Montmorency family. As such, due to the Montmorency male line dying out with Henri in 1632, his sister Charlotte Marguerite became the owner of L'Isle Adam as well as the Duchy of Montmorency.

Charlotte Marguerite de Montmorency married Henri de Bourbon, prince de Condé in 1609. Henri was a second cousin of Henry IV of France, held the rank of First Prince of the Blood and was the head of the incorrectly called Bourbon-Condé branch of the reigning House of Bourbon. Charlotte Marguerite was later Henry IV's mistress.

=== From Condé to Conti ===
At the death of Henri de Bourbon (Charlotte Marguerite's husband) in 1651, the Condé estate was divided up between their three children:

- Anne Geneviève, duchesse de Longueville (1619–1679)
- Louis, le Grand Condé (1621–1686)
- Armand, prince de Conti (1629–1666)

L'Isle Adam was given to Armand, the Prince of Conti since 1629, who founded another cadet branch, another incorrectly named Bourbon-Conti line. The Conti line would remain in possession of L'Isle Adam right up to the French Revolution.

Armand de Bourbon was named the governor of Languedoc in 1660 having taken command of the army which in 1654, invaded Catalonia, where he captured three towns from the Spaniards. He afterwards led the French forces in Italy, but after his defeat before Alessandria in 1657, he retired to Languedoc where he devoted himself to study and mysticism until his death. As such Armand never paid L'Isle Adam much attention, dying in 1666 at his residence at Pézenas, southern France. Armand's widow Anne Marie Martinozzi, niece of Cardinal Mazarin, stayed at the château. Presumably she was there on the night of 30 June to 1 July 1669 when the château was destroyed by fire. The reconstruction of the building continued speedily until 1671 when it was habitable again.

Armand and Anne Marie had two sons which survived infancy; Louis Armand (1661–1685) and the famous François Louis, le Grand Conti. Louis Armand married Marie Anne de Bourbon, daughter of Louis XIV and Louise de La Vallière but had no issue; François Louis was greatly interested in his estates and showed a particular liking to L'Isle Adam. He married his first cousin's daughter Marie Thérèse de Bourbon. Marie Thérèse, who loved her husband passionately, was ignored by her husband who often unfaithful with members of both sexes. Despite this the couple had seven children, three of which survived into adulthood.

In 1707, le Grand Conti managed to buy the whole of the Île du Prieuré from Jean-François de Chamillart, Bishop of Senlis and Prior of the earlier mentioned Saint Chrodegand. Conti also had the building remodelled to suit modern tastes and redecorated it greatly. He died in 1709 from a combination of gout and syphilis. His widow Marie Thérèse lived at the property in her later life, dying in Paris in 1732.

The château went through a quiet stage until Louis François de Bourbon, grandson of le Grand Conti, enlarged the estate by purchasing the Château de Stors from the marquis de Verderonne in 1746. Having lost his wife Louise Diane d'Orléans in childbirth in 1736 at Issy, Louis François retired to L'Isle Adam for two years where he threw himself into the excellent hunting space around the château. He often had magnificent parties on the estate.

== The Destruction ==
The Conti residence was confiscated during the revolution, it was sold to Monsieur Heyer in 1798 who demolished it in parts. By 1813 nothing was left of the stunning residence. On 12 May 1821, Madame Papon, widow of Monsieur Christophe Ducamp, bought the lands of Parmain as well as all the Île du Prieuré and much land within the town of L'Isle Adam. At first she constructed a beautiful abode at Parmain (1828), but this property was damaged in 1846 by the arrival of the railway. In 1857, Madame Papon therefore undertook the construction of a small property on the Île du Prieuré in the Louis XIII style on the location of the former Conti château.

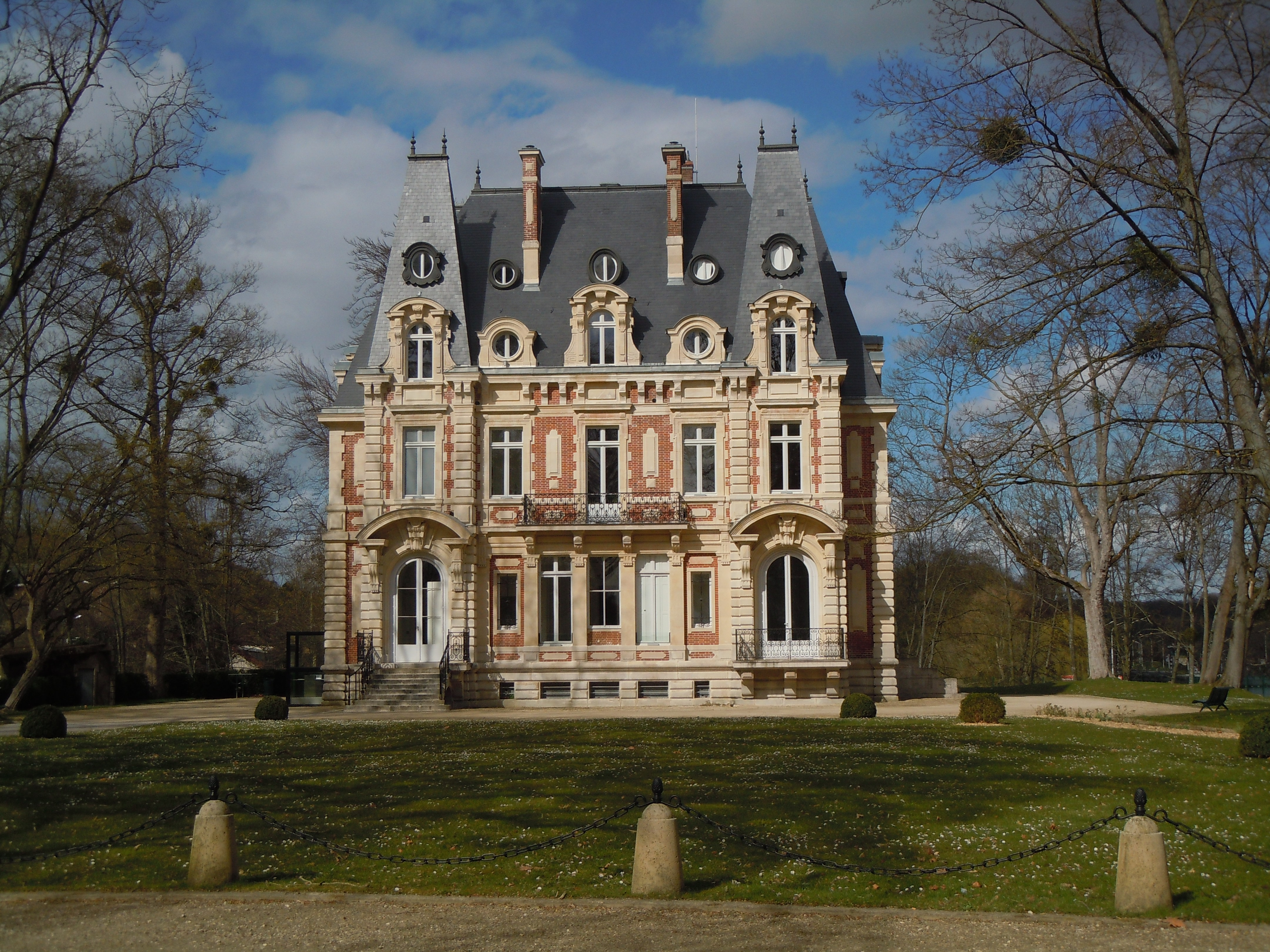
The new castle, built in 1858, is the property of the municipality of l'Isle-Adam

Later on, the property passed onto Monsieur Amédée Bread, then to his son, Henri Bread, diplomat and composer. The property was burned by the Prussians during the war of 1870. The castle was again rebuilt and uses as a hotel. It was then bought in 1985 by a group of corporations related to the exploitation of oil. It was the bought by the L'Isle-Adam municipality in 2005.

== Site ==
Three leagues from Pontoise and six leagues from Chantilly, L'Isle-Adam and the castle was on the extreme north of the Île du Prieuré, between the hamlet of Parmain, on the right shore of the Oise, and the town of L'Isle-Adam, on the left shore.

A bridge linked up the Île du Prieuré to Parmain and another to the L'île de la Cohue. The site presented evident strategic interest, allowing the Middle Ages to check the passage on the Oise. In addition, the abundance of water was a defensive part and later helped irrigate the gardens of the various owners. On the other hand, the island created great constraint's for the architects. who had to clearly work on a difficult but unique site.

Also, the irregularity of the course of the Oise and the nature of the land, caused serious problems for stability, infiltrations and of undermine.

== Bibliography ==
- Élyne Olivier-Valengin, « Le château des princes de Bourbon Conti à L'Isle-Adam », in : Les trésors des princes de Bourbon Conti, Paris, Somogy Éditions d'art, 2000 – ISBN 2-85056-398-6
