= Congress of Arras =

1435 diplomatic meeting during the Hundred Years' War

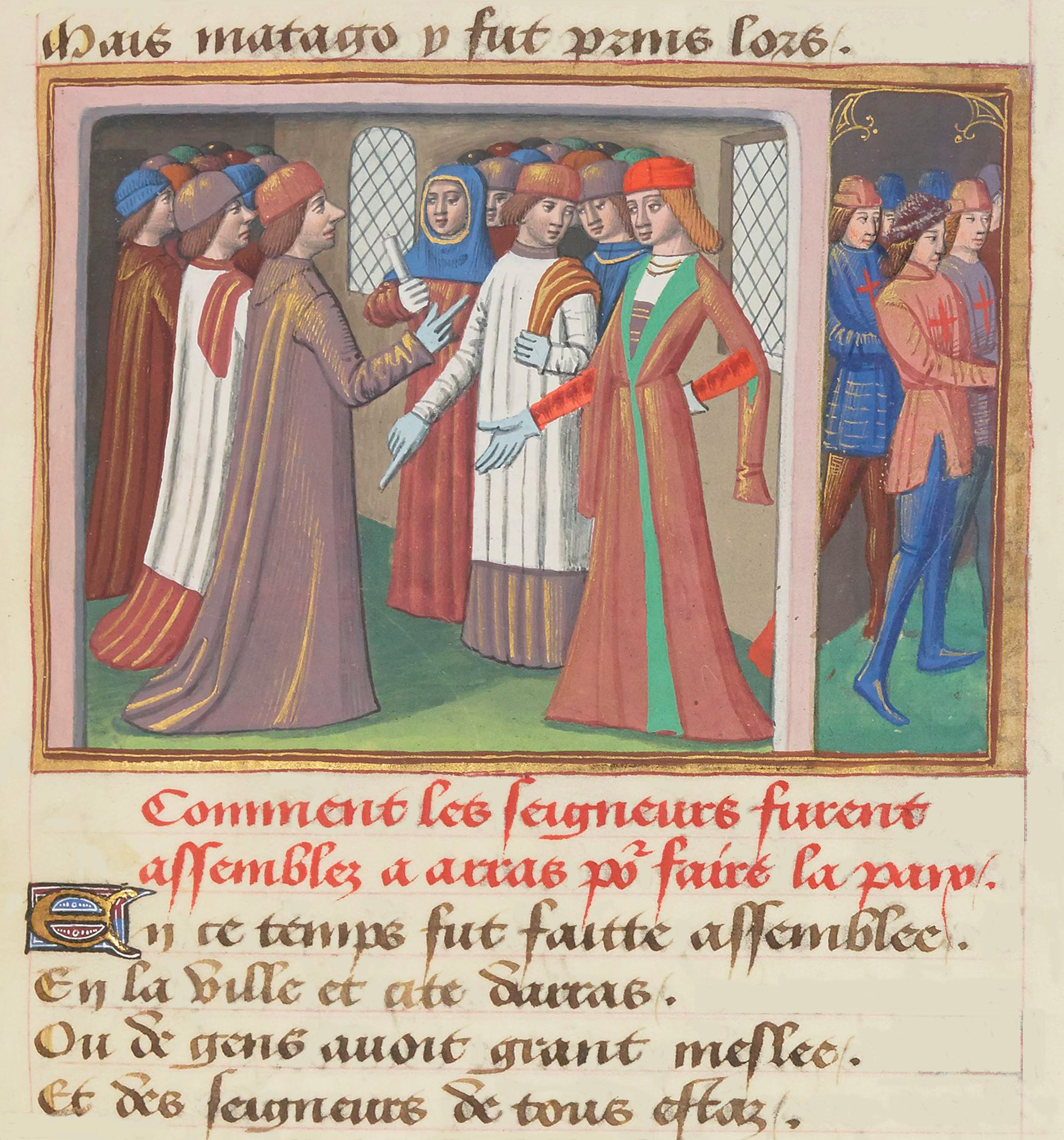
- Small illustration from Vigiles de Charles VII (c. 1484) depicting the congress
- Type: Peace congress
- Context: Hundred Years' War; Armagnac–Burgundian Civil War
- Date: 5 August – 21 September 1435
- Place: Arras, County of Artois, France
- Parties: Kingdom of France; Kingdom of England; Duchy of Burgundy
- Outcome: The English walked out after no agreement was reached. Treaty of Arras between France and Burgundy

The Congress of Arras was a diplomatic congregation established at Arras in the summer of 1435 during the Hundred Years' War, between representatives of England, France and Burgundy. It was the first negotiation since the Treaty of Troyes and replaced the fifteen-year agreement between Burgundy and England that would have seen the dynasty of Henry V inherit the French crown. Historian Richard Vaughan has called it "Europe's first real peace congress".

Toward the close of the Hundred Years' War, both the Congress and the subsequent Treaty of Arras represented diplomatic failures for England and major successes for France and led to the expulsion of the English from France.

== Congregation ==
English negotiators entered the congress believing it was a peace negotiation between England and France only. They proposed an extended truce and a marriage between adolescent King Henry VI of England and a daughter of French king Charles VII of France. The English were unwilling to renounce their claim to the crown of France. This position prevented meaningful negotiation. The English delegation broke off from the congress in mid-session to put down a raid by French captains Xaintrailles and La Hire.

Meanwhile, the French delegation and leading clergy urged Philip the Good of Burgundy to reconcile with Charles VII. Burgundy was an appanage at the time, virtually an independent state, and had been allied with England since the murder of Philip's father in 1419. Charles VII had been complicit in that crime. Philip despised the French king but believed he would gain an advantage in a French government ruled by a weak French king instead of the English regent John of Lancaster, Duke of Bedford.

Philip's sister Anne of Burgundy had been married to the English duke. Relations between the two men deteriorated following her death in 1432. When the English delegation returned to the congress they too found their Burgundian ally had switched sides. The Duke of Bedford, at this point the only man keeping the Anglo-Burgundian alliance standing, died on 14 September 1435, one week before the congress concluded.

== Participants ==
=== For the English ===
- John Kemp, Archbishop of York.
- Henry Beaufort, Cardinal.
- John Holland, Earl of Huntingdon.
- William de la Pole, Earl of Suffolk.
- Walter Hungerford.
- William Alnwick, Bishop of Norwich.
- Thomas Rodborne, Bishop of St David's.
- William Lyndwood, keeper of the privy seal.
- Sir John Radcliff, seneschal of Aquitaine.
- John Popham, knight.
- Robert Shotesbrook, knight.
- William Sprever, doctor of laws.
- Pierre Cauchon, Bishop of Lisieux.
- Jean de Rinel, royal secretary.
- Nicolas de Mailly, bailli of Vermandois.
- Robert le Jeune, bailli of Amiens.
- Guillaume Erard, doctor of theology.
- Nicolas Fraillon, Archdeacon of Paris.
- Raoul Roussel, doctor of laws, treasurer of Rouen.
- Thomas de Courcelles, Parisian ambassador.

and their prisoners, Duke of Orleans, Count of Eu.

=== For the French ===
Representing Charles VII:

- Charles I, Duke of Bourbon (titular head of embassy and Duke of Burgundy's brother-in-law).
- Regnault de Chartres, Archbishop of Reims, Chancellor of France.
- Arthur de Richemont, Constable of France.
- Arnold, Duke of Guelders.
- Charles I, Count of Nevers.
- Richard, Count of Étampes.
- Antoine, Count of Vaudémont.
- Engelbert I, Count of Nassau
- Catherine, Damoiseau of Cleves
- John, Bishop of Liége.
- Jan van Gavere, Bishop of Cambrai.
- Bishop of Arras.
- Bishop of Auxerre.
- Seigneur de Crévecoeur.
- Seigneur de Charny.

For Burgundy:

- Duke Philip of Burgundy.
- Chancellor Nicolas Rolin.
- Antoine I, Seigneur de Croÿ.
- Hugues de Lannoy, Seigneur de Santes.
- Louis de Luxembourg, Count of Saint-Pol.
- Jean II de Luxembourg, Count of Ligny.
- Seigneur de Roubaix.

Among the possibly as many as 58 who attended for the French, Guidon VII, seigneur de la Roche Guyon, and Gilles de Duremont, Abbot of Fécamp, may also have been present.

=== Mediating ===
Niccolò Albergati, Bishop of Bologna, papal legate

== Treaty of Arras ==
Treaty of Arras
- Type: Peace treaty
- Context: Hundred Years' War
- Signed: 21 September 1435
- Location: Arras, County of Artois
- Mediators: Niccolò Albergati
- Signatories: Burgundian party Armagnac party

The congress gave rise to the second Treaty of Arras, which was signed on 20/21 September 1435 and became an important diplomatic achievement for the French in the closing years of the Hundred Years' War. Overall, it reconciled a longstanding feud between King Charles VII of France and Duke Philip III of Burgundy (Philip the Good). Philip recognized Charles VII as king of France and, in return, Philip was exempted from homage to the crown, and Charles agreed to punish the murderers of Philip's father Duke John I of Burgundy (John the Fearless).

By breaking the alliance between Burgundy and England, Charles VII consolidated his position as King of France against a rival claim by Henry VI of England. The political distinction between Armagnacs and Burgundians ceased to be significant from this time onward. France already had Scotland as an ally and England was left isolated. From 1435 onward, English rule in France underwent steady decline.

The congress's limited success was facilitated by representatives of Pope Eugene IV and the Council of Basel. Members of each of these delegations wrote legal opinions absolving Duke Philip of Burgundy from his former obligations to England.

=== Provisions ===
Charles VII disavowed participation in the assassination of Duke John of Burgundy (John the Fearless) of the Duchy of Burgundy, father of Duke Philip of Burgundy (Philip the Good), and condemned the act and promised to punish the perpetrators.

Furthermore, the following domains became vassal states of the Duke of Burgundy:

- The County of Auxerre and the County of Boulogne
- The Somme towns and Péronne
- Ponthieu
- The Vermandois, with its capital Saint-Quentin.

In return, the Duchy of Burgundy recognized Charles VII as King of France and returned the County of Tonnerre. Also, Philip the Good was exempted from rendering homage, fealty, or service to Charles VII, as he still believed that the king may have been complicit in his father's murder. Upon the death of either the king or the duke the homage would be resumed.

== See also ==
- Armagnacs
- Burgundian (party)
- France in the Middle Ages
- Hundred Years' War
- List of treaties
