= Book of hours of Joan of France =

15th-century illuminated manuscript named after Joan of France, Duchess of Bourbon

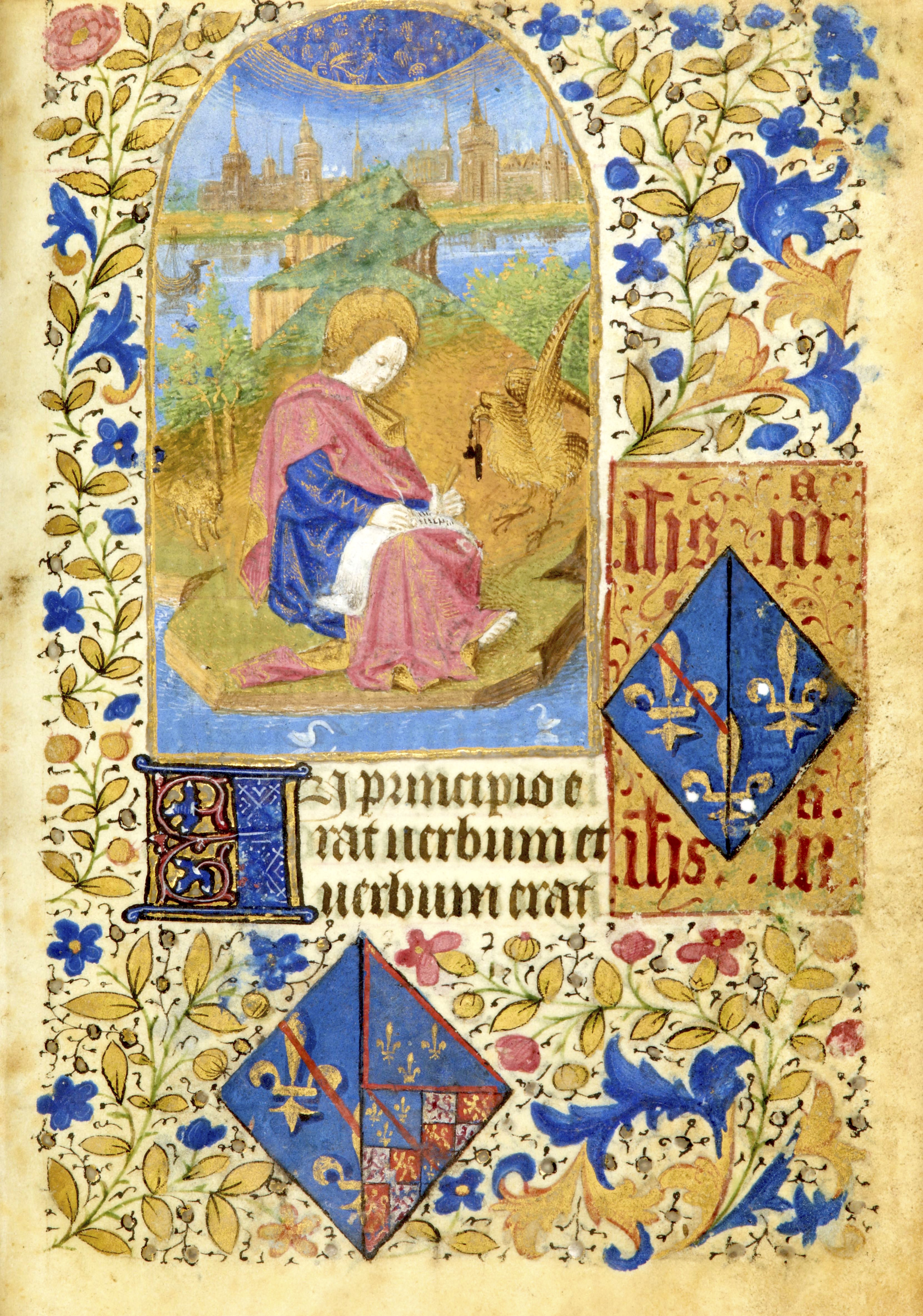
Folio 13 recto of the book, showing John of Patmos and the coats of arms of Joan of France (above) and Catherine of Armagnac (below)

The book of hours of Joan of France (French: livre d'heures de Jeanne de France, BnF ms NAL 3244) is a 15th-century illuminated manuscript forming a book of hours, named after Joan of France, Duchess of Bourbon, who owned the book in the 15th century. After her death, it passed to Catherine of Armagnac, whose coat of arms was added to the book. After her death, the whereabouts of the book are unknown; it reappeared again in the late 19th century when it was bought by private collector Victor Martin Le Roy. It then passed to his son-in-law, art historian Jean-Joseph Marquet de Vasselot. It was again sold in 2011, and then bought by the Bibliothèque nationale de France, thanks to funding from private donors. It is classified as a national treasure of France. The rich decoration, including 28 full-page miniatures, was mostly made by the so-called Master of Jouvenel.

== History ==
The book of hours was made in the middle of the 15th century. It displays the coat of arms of Joan of France, the daughter of King Charles VII of France and Marie of Anjou. However, these coats of arms appear to have been painted over an earlier set of coats of arms, perhaps that of Margaret, Countess of Vertus or Marie of Brittany, abbess of Fontevraud Abbey. The book was given by Charles VII to his daughter for the occasion of her marriage to John II, Duke of Bourbon in 1452. On the death of Joan in 1482, the book passed to the second wife of John II, Catherine of Armagnac. Following her death in 1487, the fate of the book for the following centuries is unknown. It resurfaced in the possession of an antiques dealer in Leipzig, Germany in the 19th century, and was subsequently bought by French art collector Victor Martin Le Roy, and eventually passed to his son-in-law, art historian Jean-Joseph Marquet de Vasselot. It remained in private ownership until 2011, when it was sold at an auction at Christie's. A call was launched by the Bibliothèque nationale de France, the French national library, for private donors to supply the means to buy the manuscript, and following wide public support the library bought the book. Since then it has formed part of the library collection and has been classified as a national treasure of France. A detailed description of the book was made in 1909 by librarian and art historian Paul-André Lemoisne.

== Description ==
The pages of the book are made of vellum and the text is written in Gothic script. It is unusually richly decorated, both with miniatures and decorations in the margins. It contains 28 full-page miniatures and 37 smaller miniatures, two of which are attributed to Jean Fouquet and the rest made by the Master of Jouvenel. The coat of arms of Joan of France appears on seven of the pages of the book, and the coat of arms of Catherine of Armagnac on four of the pages. The binding is from the 19th century, reusing velvet of an earlier date.
