= Joan of France, Duchess of Bourbon =

Duchess of Bourbon from 1456 to 1482

Joan of France
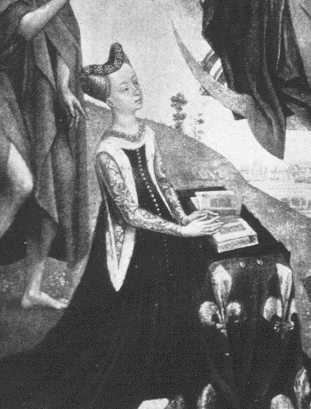
- 15th-century portrait of Joan

Duchess consort of Bourbon
- Tenure: 4 December 1456 - 4 May 1482
- Born: 4 May 1435
- Died: 1482 (aged 46–47)
- Spouse: John II, Duke of Bourbon
- House: Valois
- Father: Charles VII of France
- Mother: Marie of Anjou
- Religion: Catholic

Joan of France, Duchess of Bourbon (French: Jeanne de Valois; 4 May 1435 – 1482), also known as Joan of Valois, was the seventh child and fourth surviving daughter of Charles VII of France and Marie of Anjou. She was the original owner of the book of hours of Joan of France, now held in the Bibliothèque nationale de France, which is classified as a national treasure of France.

== Book of hours of Joan of France ==
The book of hours, known by medieval scholars as livre d'heures de Jeanne de France, was given by King Charles VII to his daughter Joan to celebrate the occasion of her marriage to John II, Duke of Bourbon in 1452. The coat of arms of Joan of France appears on seven pages (including the cover) within the tome, alongside miniatures and decorations in the margins.

== Life ==
Born into the House of Valois, a Cadet branch of the Capetian Dynasty, Joan of France was the second daughter of King Charles VII of France and Marie of Anjou. Her parents were second cousins and both great-grandchildren of King John II of France.

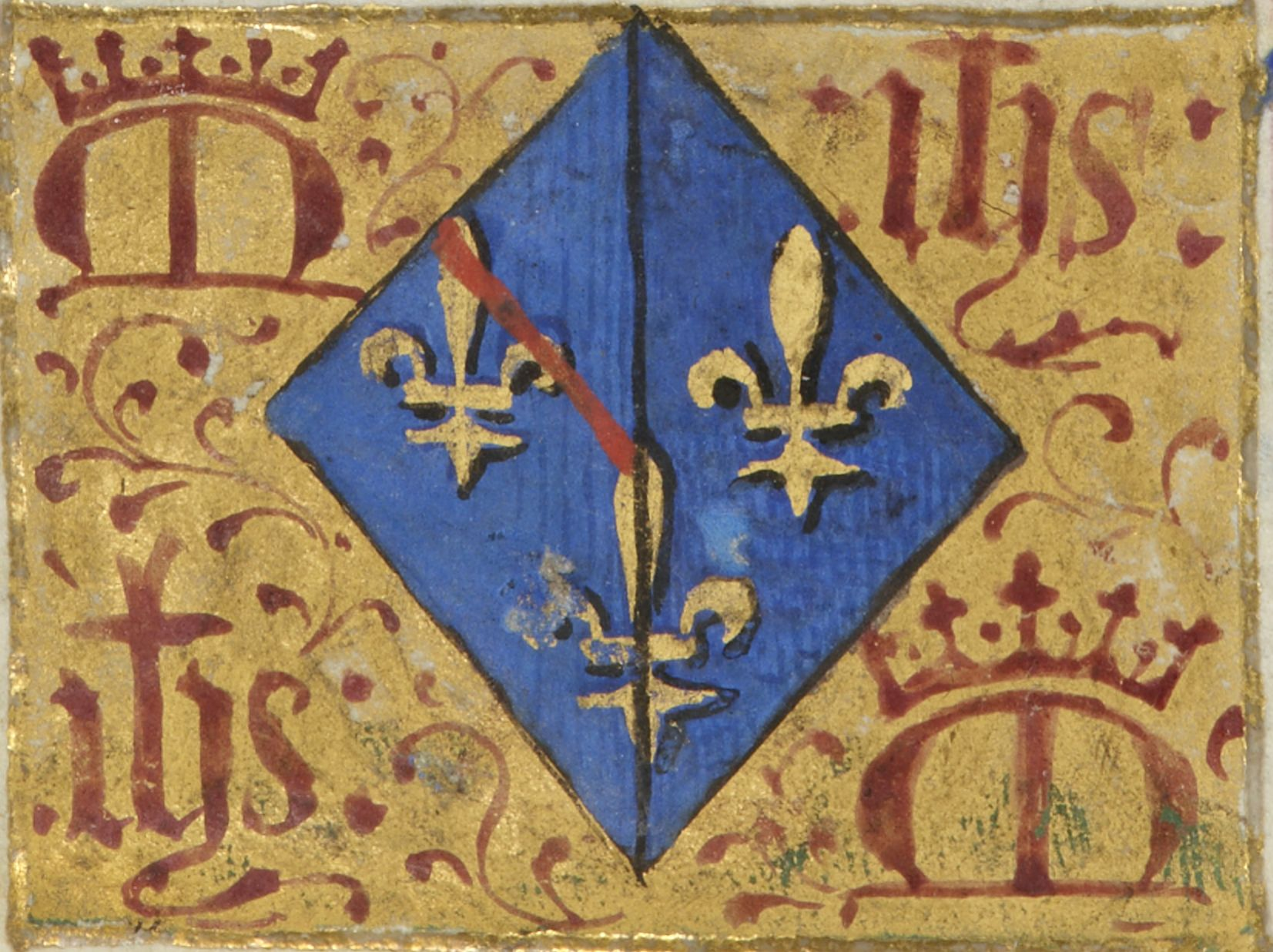
The coat of arms of Joan of France painted in the 15th-century Book of Hours of Joan of France.

Joan's paternal grandfather was King Charles VI of France, referred as "Charles the Mad" due to his history of psychotic episodes.

Joan's maternal grandmother was Yolande of Aragon, Duchess of Anjou, who played a significant role in the power struggles between England and France. Most notably, she influenced the financing of Joan of Arc's army in 1429 which helped tip the balance in favour of the French.

In 1447, she married John II, Duke of Bourbon, at Château de Moulins; however they had no surviving children.

== Sources ==
- Morrison, Elizabeth; Hedeman, Anne Dawson (2010). Imagining the Past in France: History in Manuscript Painting, 1250-1500. J. Paul Getty Museum.
