= Eleanor of Scotland =

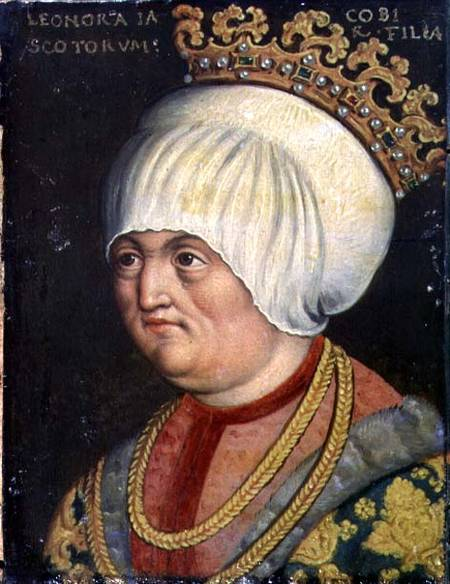

Archduchess consort of Austria
- Tenure: 1449–1480
- Born: 1433
- Died: 20 November 1480 (aged 46–47)
- Burial: Stams Tyrol, Austria
- Spouse: Sigismund, Archduke of Austria
- House: Stewart
- Father: James I of Scotland
- Mother: Joan Beaufort

Eleanor of Scotland (1433 – 20 November 1480) was an Archduchess of Austria by marriage to Sigismund, Archduke of Austria, a noted translator, and regent of Austria in 1455–58 and 1467. She was a daughter of James I of Scotland and Joan Beaufort.

== Early life ==
Eleanor was the sixth child of James I of Scotland and his wife, Joan Beaufort. James I was known for his great love of literature which he passed on to Eleanor and her sister Margaret.

Starting in 1445, Eleanor lived at the court of Charles VII of France, where it was suggested that she should marry Frederick, King of the Romans. In 1447, she accompanied Marie of Anjou, Queen of France, on a pilgrimage on Mont Saint-Michel.

== Archduchess of Austria ==
In 1448 or 1449 the teenage Eleanor married Sigismund, a Habsburg Duke, then Archduke of Further Austria, and finally ruler of Tyrol (from 1446 to 1490). Whilst travelling to her wedding she visited her sister Annabella of Scotland, who was in Savoy due to her contracted marriage to Louis of Savoy, Count of Geneva.

Eleanor served as regent for her husband from 1455 to 1458 and again in 1467. In his absence she raised funds, purchased guns and sought mercenaries for his army and took over the administration of his estates.

== Translation ==
Eleanor was a great lover of books and became literate in several languages, even though it is likely that she learned German after her marriage. She was able to write in Latin, French, German and Scots.

Eleanor translated The History of the King's Son of Galicia, named Pontus, and the beautiful Sydonia (Pontus and Sidonia) from French to German. The French original passed through several editions between 1480 and 1550. In addition to translating the work, Eleanor also revised it to increase the political power of women. Only the courts with effective female advisors retained their political stability. Based on the number of printings, it was a popular book. A copy of the German translation, preserved in the library of Gotha, bears the date 1465.

In 1473, the German humanist and translator Heinrich Steinhöwel dedicated his paraphrased and translated version of Boccaccio's De Claris Mulieribus (Concerning Famous Women) to her.

Eleanor and Elisabeth von Nassau-Saarbrücken are credited with introducing the prose novel to German literature.

== Death ==
Eleanor died giving birth to her son Wolfgang at Innsbruck on 20 November 1480. She was buried in the Cistercian Abbey at Stams, Tyrol, Austria.

== Gallery ==
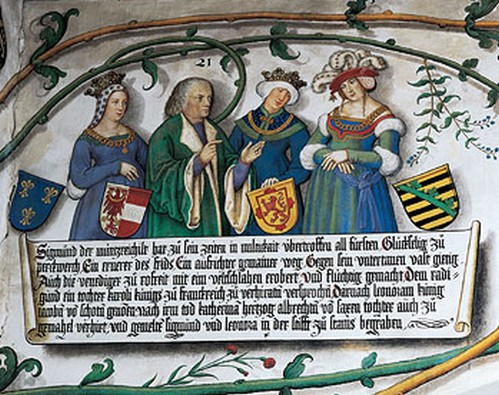
Sigismund, Archduke of Austria and his betrothed Radegonde of Valois and successive wives Eleanor of Scotland and Catherine, Archduchess of Austria.

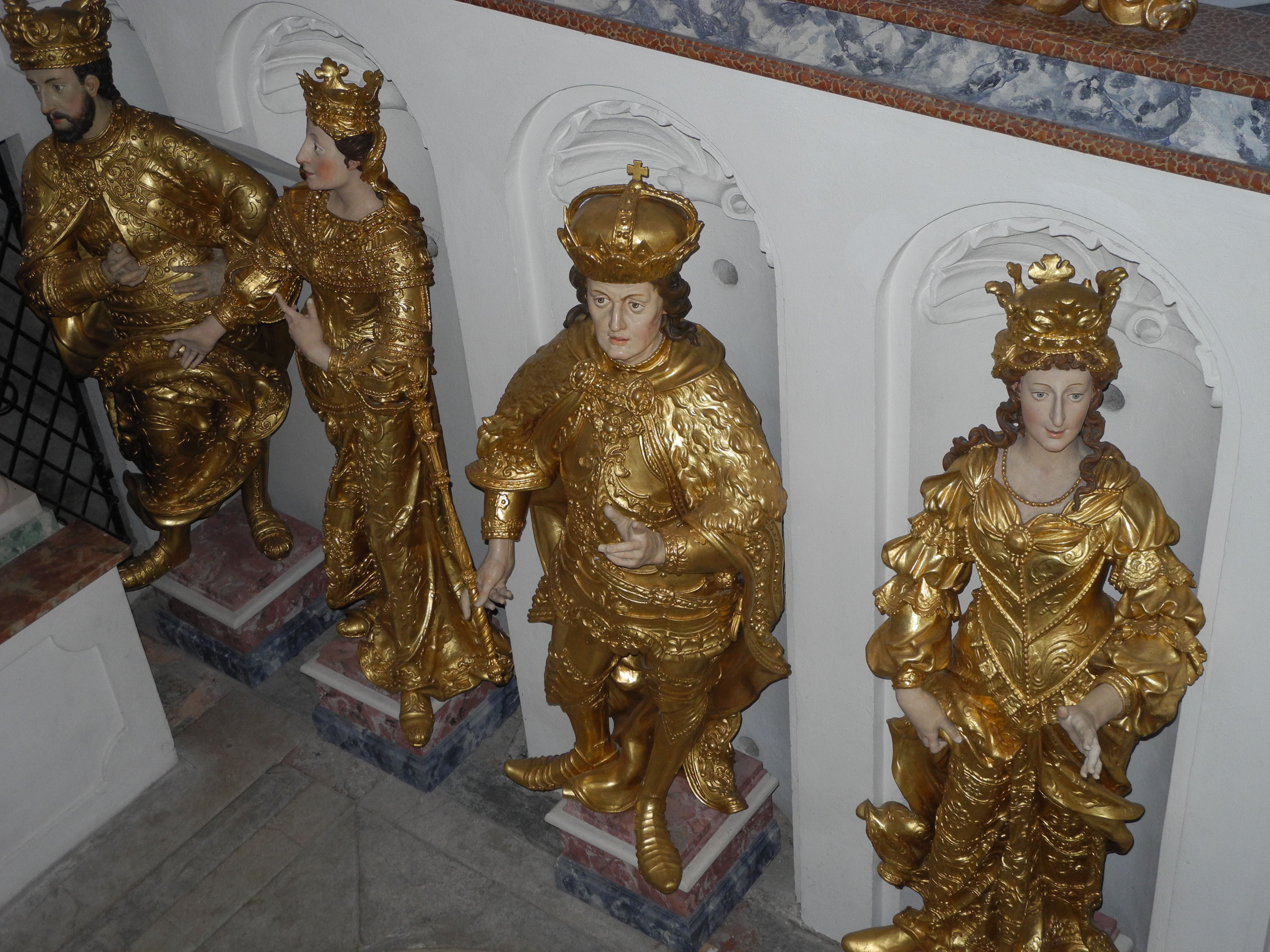
Sigismund and Eleanor Statues in Stams, Tyrol, Austria.
