= Catherine of France =

Catherine of France may refer to:

- Catherine of France, Countess of Montpensier (1378–1388), daughter of Charles V of France
- Catherine of Valois (1401–1437), daughter of Charles VI of France, queen consort of Henry V of England
- Catherine of France, Countess of Charolais (1428–1446), daughter of Charles VII of France, first spouse to Charles I, Duke of Burgundy

== See also ==
- Catherine of Valois (disambiguation)
