= Charles of Valois, Duke of Berry =

Charles
- Duke of Berry, Normandy, and Aquitaine
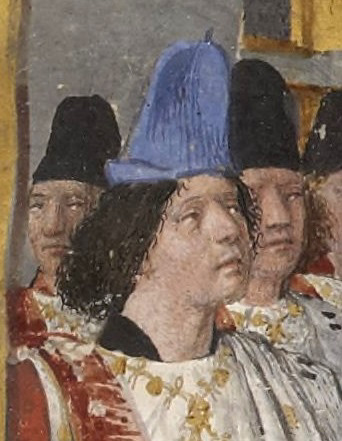
- Born: 26 December 1446; Tours, Kingdom of France
- Died: 24/25 May 1472 (aged 25)
- House: Valois
- Father: Charles VII of France
- Mother: Marie of Anjou

Charles (French: Charles de France; 26 December 1446 – 24/25 May 1472), Duke of Berry, later Duke of Normandy and Duke of Aquitaine, was a son of Charles VII, King of France. He spent most of his life in conflict with his elder brother, King Louis XI.

== Early life ==
Charles was born at Tours, last child and fourth son of Charles VII and Marie of Anjou. As his elder brother, the Dauphin Louis, had repeatedly run into conflict with his father and since 1456 was living in exile at the court of Burgundy, some expected the crown to pass to Charles. When Charles VII died in 1461, however, Louis XI succeeded nonetheless.

After his accession, Louis XI granted his younger brother the Duchy of Berry as an appanage. Dissatisfied with this, Charles joined with Charles, Count of Charolais, and other powerful nobles such as Francis II, Duke of Brittany in the League of the Public Weal in May 1465 and they placed him at the head of their league. This started a rebellion which ended in October with the Treaty of Conflans between Louis XI and the Count of Charolais.

== Duke of Normandy ==
Under the treaty, Charles was granted the Duchy of Normandy as an additional appanage. He proved unable to control his new possession and ran into conflict with his former ally Francis II of Brittany. Louis dispatched the royal army to Normandy and assumed direct royal control of the Duchy. Charles, now reconciled with Duke Francis, fled to Brittany, where he remained until September 1468, when he and Francis signed the Treaty of Ancenis with Louis, promising to abandon the former Count of Charolais, now Duke of Burgundy.

Coat of arms of Charles as Duke of Aquitaine, quartering one of the three lions of Plantagenet, borne by the Kings of England, the former Dukes of Aquitaine

In October 1468 Louis was imprisoned by Charles of Burgundy during a conference at Péronne. In order to obtain his release, Louis agreed to grant Champagne to his brother as compensation for Normandy. Once free, Louis reneged on the promises made under duress but in April 1469, he finally reconciled with his brother, granting him the Duchy of Aquitaine, recently won back from the Kings of England in 1453. Thenceforth Charles quartered the royal arms of France (differenced by a bordure engrailed gules) with one of the three lions of Plantagenet, to signify the duchy.

Charles also agreed with the Duke of Burgundy to marry the latter's only child and heir, Mary of Burgundy. Louis had no intention of allowing a union between his brother and his enemy's daughter and dispatched envoys to Pope Paul II to ensure that the necessary dispensation, required on grounds of consanguinity, was not granted. Louis was unsuccessful in this endeavour, as the Pope granted the dispensation.

Still, the marriage plan came to nothing as Charles died at Bordeaux in May 1472, probably from a combination of tuberculosis and a venereal disease contracted from his mistress Colette de Chambes, the wife of Louis d'Amboise, Viscount of Thouars. (Note: Monks indicates Louis d'Amboise died in 1470, while his wife died before Charles.)

Charles died 24/25 May 1472 and left no legitimate issue. His apanage of Berry returned to the crown.

== Issue ==
With his mistress Colette de Chambes he had:

- Jeanne de Guyenne (b. 1470), a dominican nun
- Anne (b. 1471), married in 1490 to François de Volvire, Baron de Ruffec. Without issue.

== Ancestry ==
Ancestors of Charles of Valois, Duke of Berry

16. John II of France
8. Charles V of France
17. Bonne of Bohemia
4. Charles VI of France
18. Peter I, Duke of Bourbon
9. Joanna of Bourbon
19. Isabella of Valois
2. Charles VII of France
20. Stephen II, Duke of Bavaria
10. Stephen III, Duke of Bavaria
21. Elizabeth of Sicily
5. Isabeau of Bavaria
22. Bernabò Visconti
11. Taddaea Visconti
23. Beatrice della Scala
1. Charles of Valois, Duke of Berry
24. John II of France (= 16)
12. Louis I of Naples
25. Bonne of Bohemia (= 17)
6. Louis II of Naples
26. Charles of Châtillon, Count of Blois
13. Marie of Châtillon
27. Jeanne of Penthièvre
3. Marie of Anjou
28. Peter IV of Aragon
14. John I of Aragon
29. Eleanor of Sicily
7. Yolande of Aragon
30. Robert I, Duke of Bar
15. Violante de Bar
31. Marie of Valois

== Coats of arms ==
Arms as Duke of Berry (1461–1465)

Arms as Duke of Normandy (1465–1469)

Arms as Duke of Guyenne (1469–1472)

== Sources ==
- Bakos, Adrianna E. (1997). Images of Kingship in Early Modern France: Louis XI in Political Thought, 1560-1789. Routledge.
- Favier, Jean (2001). Louis XI. Fayard.
- Heers, Jacques (2016). Louis XI. Perrin.
- Tournoy, Gilbert (2006). "An Italian Scribe at Bruges in the Second Half of the Fifteenth Century: Francesco Florio". In Claassens, Geert H. M.; Verbeke, Werner (eds.). Medieval Manuscripts in Transition: Tradition and Creative Recycling. Leuven University Press. pp. 261–308.
- Monks, Peter Rolfe (1990). The Brussels Horloge de Sapience. E.J. Brill.

French royalty
Vacant Title last held by Charles the Victorious	Duke of Berry; 1461–1472	Vacant Title next held by Joan
Vacant Title last held by Charles the Wise	Duke of Normandy; 1461–1465	Vacant
Vacant Title last held by Louis	Duke of Aquitaine; 1469–1472	Vacant
