= Catherine of Valois (disambiguation) =

Catherine of Valois (1401–1437) was the wife of Henry V, and Queen consort of England from 1420 to 1422.

Catherine of Valois may also refer to:

- Catherine of Courtenay (1274–1307), wife of Count Charles of Valois
- Catherine of Valois (1303–1346), daughter of Count Charles of Valois, and titular Empress of Constantinople as Catherine II from 1308 to 1346
- Catherine of Valois (1378–1388), youngest child of Charles V of France
- Catherine of Valois (1428–1446), daughter of Charles VII of France and Marie of Anjou. Wife of Charles the Rash.

== See also ==
- Catherine of France (disambiguation)
