= Master of Jouvenel =

French illuminator

The Master of Jouvenel uses a modified form of the V-in-square map to depict the three continents (Africa, Asia and Europe) in the Mare historiarum. The horizon indicates the Earth's curvature. The choice of map type was probably designed to flatter the patron, since his initial was V (as in Vrsins).

The Master of Jouvenel (French: Maître de Jouvenel) was an anonymous master illuminator active between 1447 and 1460. The painter, to whom many manuscripts are attributed, was undoubtedly at the head of a workshop, also called Groupe Jouvenel from which the Master of Boccace of Geneva came from, or the Master of Boethius. The painter owes his name to a manuscript in the Mare Historium commissioned by Guillaume Jouvenel des Ursins, for which his workshop produced 730 miniatures.

== Attributed manuscripts ==
- Mare historiarum of Giovanni Colonna, addition of miniatures circa 1448-1450 for Guillaume Jouvenel des Ursins, Bibliothèque nationals de France, Lat. 4915
- Moralized Bible of Philip the Bold, circa 1450, additions of miniatures after the first miniatures of the Limbourg brothers around 1402–1404. BNF, Fr. 166
- Book of hours for the use of Angers, 1450–1455, BNF, NAL3211 (14 of the 18 miniatures, in collaboration with Jean Fouquet)
- Book of hours for the use of Paris, circa 1450–1455, BNF Latin 1417 (workshop)
- Book of hours for the use of Nantes, in collaboration with the Maître du Boccace de Genève, British Library, Add.28785
- Book of hours of Louis d'Anjou, Bastard of Maine, Fitzwilliam Museum, Ms39-1950
- Book of hours of Joan of France, 1452, private collection, acquired by the BNF in 2012
- Book of hours for Paris use, circa 1460, Pierpont Morgan Library, M199
