= Radegonde of Valois =

French princess (c. 1428–1445)

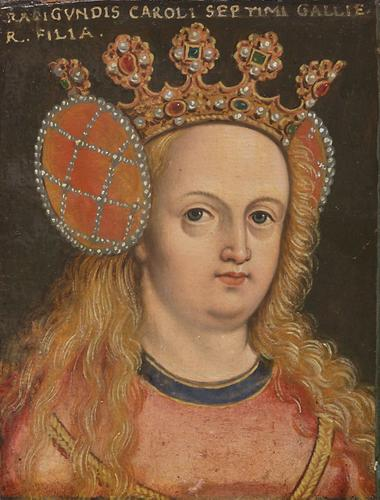
- Born: 1425/August 1428; Chinon, France
- Died: 19 March 1445; Tours, Indre-et-Loire, France
- Burial: Tours Cathedral, Tours, Indre-et-Loire, France
- House: Valois
- Father: Charles VII of France
- Mother: Marie of Anjou

Radegonde of Valois (c. 1425/August 1428 – 19 March 1445) was a French princess, eldest daughter of King Charles VII of France and Marie of Anjou. She was betrothed to Sigismund, Archduke of Austria, but died before the marriage could take place.

== Biography ==
Radegonde was born in the city of Chinon in 1425 or most probably, in August 1428, as evidenced by an act of the Queen's Treasurer General dated 29 August that year, referring to the "gesine recently made in the city of Chinon, Madame Arragonde of France".

The young princess, the eldest daughter of the king, was baptized in honour of Saint Radegund, to whom her father devoted a particular cult. According to Christian de Mérindol, this choice was explained by reasons both political, historical and religious, in this particular context of reconquest of the kingdom of France on the English:

"The name of Radegonde had several meanings: symbol of the city of Poitiers, seat of the second Parliament, so place of resistance in Paris, in the hands of the English and Burgundians, symbol of legitimacy, because the saint was the wife of Clotaire, the son of Clovis, finally a saint who could only attract the graces of heaven, so necessary to the young king."

She is the only princess of royal blood to have borne this name within the Capetian lineage.

On 22 April 1430 her father promised her in marriage to Sigismund, son of the Archduke Frederick of Austria, Count of Tyrol.

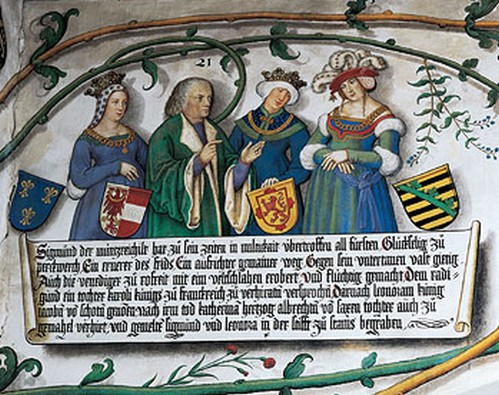
Radegonde with her betrothed Sigismund, Archduke of Austria and his successive wives Eleanor of Scotland and Catherine, Archduchess of Austria

She became ill in Tours in 1445, perhaps suffering from pleurisy contracted after returning on foot from a pilgrimage to the Basilica of Notre-Dame de l'Epine. She died on 19 March 1445, at the age of 19 years. (Note: Watanabe states Radegonde died in February 1445 at the age of nineteen.) She is buried in Tours Cathedral (French: Cathédrale Saint-Gatien de Tours) in Tours, Indre-et-Loire, France.

== Sources ==
- Debris, Cyrille (2005). "Tu Felix Austria, nube" la dynastie de Habsbourg et sa politique matrimoniale à la fin du Moyen Age (XIIIe-XVIe siècles) (in French). Brepols.
- Watanabe, Morimichi (2011). Christianson, Gerald; Izbicki, Thomas M. (eds.). Nicholas of Cusa: A Companion to his Life and his Times. Ashgate Publishing.
