= Marie of Anjou =

Queen of France from 1422 to 1461

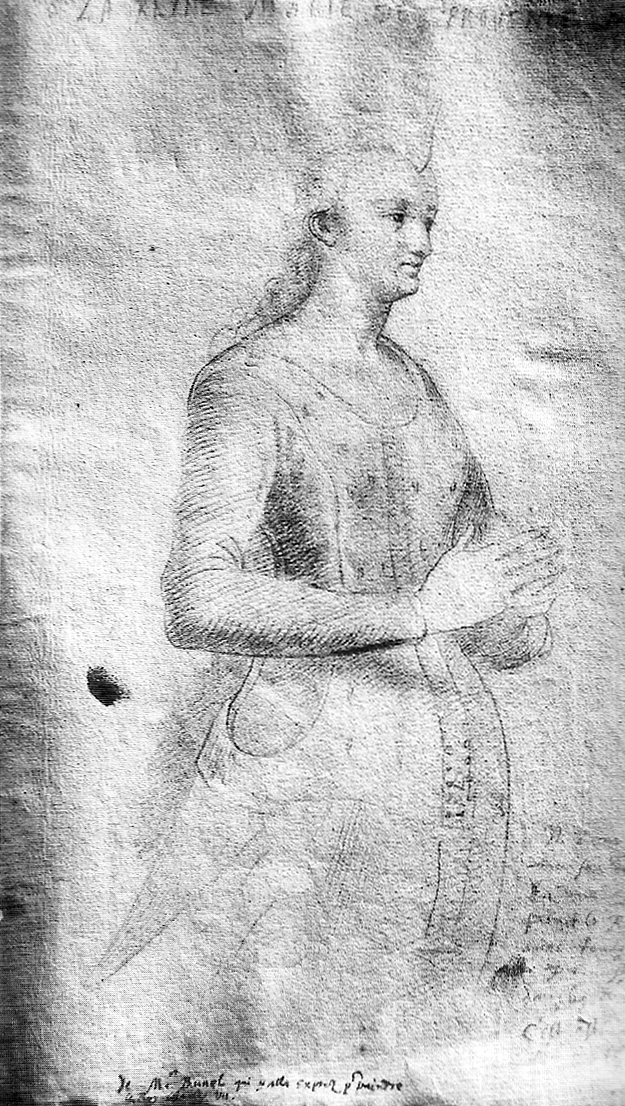

Queen consort of France
- Tenure: 18 December 1422 – 22 July 1461
- Born: 14 October 1404; Angers
- Died: 29 November 1463 (aged 59); Abbaye de Chateliers-en-Poitou
- Burial: Saint-Denis Basilica
- Spouse: Charles VII of France (m. 1422; died 1461)
- Issue detail: John of France; Louis XI, King of France; Radegonde; James of France; Catherine, Countess of Charolais; Yolande, Duchess of Savoy; Philip of France; Margaret of France; Joan of France; Mary of France; Isabella of France; Joan, Duchess of Bourbon; Magdalena, Princess of Viana; Charles, Duke of Berry
- House: Valois-Anjou
- Father: Louis II, Duke of Anjou
- Mother: Yolande of Aragon

Marie of Anjou (14 October 1404 – 29 November 1463) was Queen of France as the wife of King Charles VII from 1422 to 1461. She served as regent and presided over the council of state several times during the absence of the king.

== Life ==
Marie was the eldest daughter of Louis II, Duke of Anjou, claimant to the throne of Naples, and Yolande of Aragon, claimant to the throne of Aragon.

Marie was betrothed to her second cousin Charles, Count of Ponthieu, son and heir apparent of Charles VI of France, in 1413. When the Burgundian took Paris in 1418, Charles left her stranded, but she was taken by John the Fearless, Duke of Burgundy to Saumur to be reunited with him. However, Charles failed to arrive for the agreed rendezvous.

The wedding took place on 18 December 1422 at Bourges. The marriage made Marie Queen of France, but she was never crowned. Her husband's victory in the Hundred Years' War owed a great deal to the support he received from Marie's family, notably from her mother Yolande of Aragon.

=== Queen ===
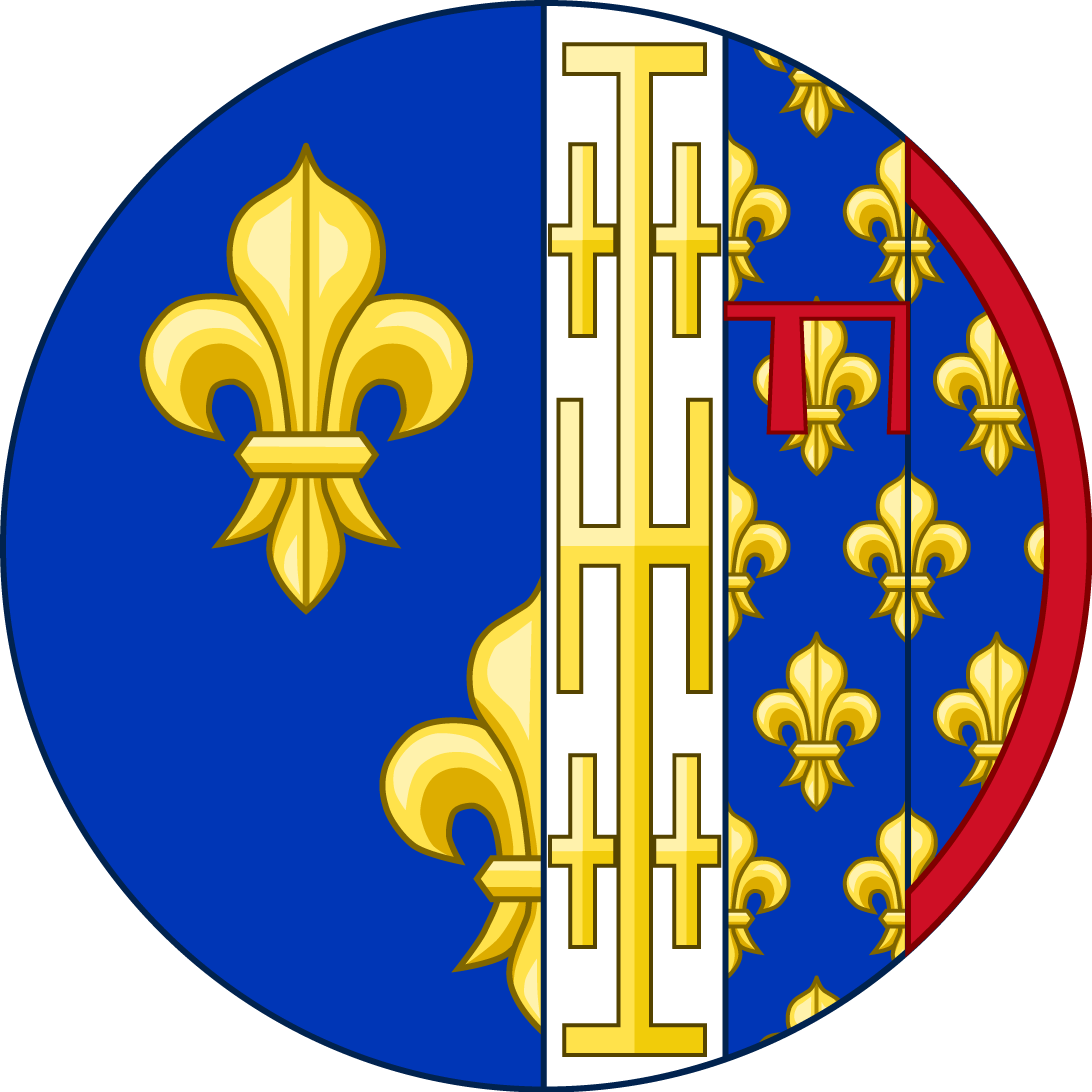
Coat of arms of Marie as queen consort of France

Queen Marie presided over the council of state several times in the absence of the king, during which she had power of attorney as regent and signed acts in the position of "lieutenant of the king" (April 1434). She made several pilgrimages, such as Puy with the king in 1424, and Mont-Saint-Michel by herself in 1447.

Marie and Charles had 14 children, but her husband's affection was primarily directed towards his mistress, Agnès Sorel, originally Marie's lady-in-waiting, who became official mistress to the king in 1444 and played a dominant role at court until her death in 1450, somewhat eclipsing the queen.

Robert Blondel composed the allegorical Treatise of the "Twelve Perils of Hell" for Queen Marie in 1455.

=== Queen dowager ===
In 1461, Charles VII died and was succeeded by their son Louis XI, making Marie queen dowager. She was granted the Château of Amboise and the income from Brabant by her son.

During the winter of 1462–63, Marie of Anjou made a pilgrimage to Santiago de Compostela. It has been speculated that she had a mission in Spain as secret ambassador for her son, due to the political situation at the time and the fact that she made the pilgrimage during winter time, when the roads were so bad that such trips were normally avoided if possible.

She died at the age of 59 on 29 November 1463 at the Cistercian Abbaye de Chateliers-en-Poitou (now in Nouvelle-Aquitaine region) on her return. She is buried in the basilica of Saint-Denis alongside her husband.

== Issue ==
Marie and Charles had:

- Louis XI of France (3 July 1423 – 30 August 1483), married firstly, Margaret of Scotland, no issue. Married secondly, Charlotte of Savoy, had issue.
- John (d. 19 September 1426)
- Radegonde (1425 or August 1428 – 19 March 1445), betrothed to Sigismund, Archduke of Austria, on 22 July 1430
- Catherine (1428 – 13 July 1446), married Charles the Bold, no issue
- James (1432 – 2 March 1437)
- Yolande (23 September 1434 – 23/29 August 1478), married Amadeus IX, Duke of Savoy, had issue
- Joan (4 May 1435 – 4 May 1482), married John II, Duke of Bourbon
- Philip (4 February 1436 – 11 June 1436)
- Margaret (May 1437 – 24 July 1438)
- Joan (7 September 1438 – 26 December 1446), twin of Marie
- Mary (7 September 1438 – 14 February 1439), twin of Joan
- Isabella (d. 1441)
- Magdalena (1 December 1443 – 21 January 1495), married Gaston of Foix, Prince of Viana, had issue.
- Charles (12 December 1446 – 24 May 1472)

== Sources ==
- Anne of France (2004). Jansen, Sharon L. (ed.). Anne of France : Lessons for My Daughter. D.S. Brewer.
- Ashdown-Hill, John (2016). The Private Life of Edward IV. Amberley Publishing.
- Debris, Cyrille (2005). "Tu Felix Austria, nube" la dynastie de Habsbourg et sa politique matrimoniale à la fin du Moyen Age (XIIIe-XVIe siècles) (in French). Brepols.
- Gaude-Ferragu, Murielle (2016). Queenship in Medieval France, 1300-1500. Palgrave Macmillan.
- Green, David (2014). The Hundred Years War: A People's History. Yale University Press.
- Sumption, Jonathan (2015). The Hundred Years War. Vol. 4: Cursed Kings. University of Pennsylvania Press. ISBN 978-0-8122-4799-2.
- Ward, A.W.; Prothero, G.W.; Leathes, Stanley, eds. (1934). The Cambridge Modern History. Vol. XIII. Cambridge University Press.
- Wolffe, Bertram (1981). Henry VI. Yale University Press.
- Morrison, Elizabeth; Hedeman, Anne D., eds. (2010). Imagining the Past in France: History in Manuscript Painting, 1250-1500. J. Paul Getty Museum.

Marie of Anjou House of Valois-Anjou Cadet branch of the Capetian dynasty Born: 14 October 1404 Died: 29 November 1463
French royalty
Vacant Title last held by Isabeau of Bavaria	Queen consort of France; 1422 – 22 July 1461	Succeeded by Charlotte of Savoy
