= Catherine of Saxony, Archduchess of Austria =

Catherine of Saxony
- Archduchess of Austria
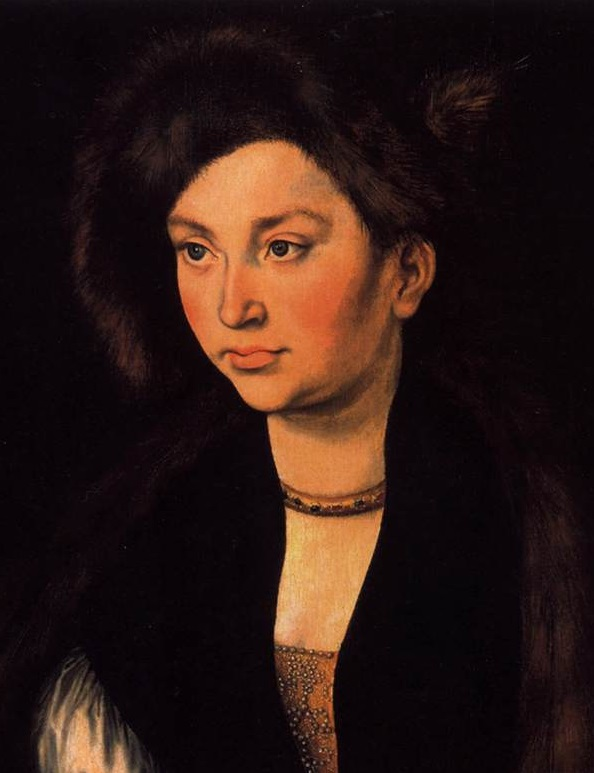
- Portrait by Lucas Cranach the Elder
- Born: 24 July 1468; Grimma, Saxony
- Died: 10 February 1524 (aged 55); Calenberg, Brunswick-Lüneburg
- Burial: St. Blaise's Church, Münden
- Spouse: Sigismund, Archduke of Austria; Eric I, Duke of Brunswick-Lüneburg
- House: House of Wettin
- Father: Albert III, Duke of Saxony
- Mother: Sidonie of Poděbrady

Catherine of Saxony (German: Katharina von Sachsen; 24 July 1468 – 10 February 1524), a member of the House of Wettin, was the second wife of Sigismund, Archduke of Austria and Regent of Tyrol.

== Life ==
Born in Grimma, Catherine was the eldest child of Duke Albert III of Saxony and his wife, the Bohemian princess Sidonie of Poděbrady. Her paternal grandparents were Elector Frederick III of Saxony and Margaret of Austria, daughter of the Habsburg duke Ernest the Iron. Her maternal grandparents were King George of Poděbrady and his first wife Kunigunde of Sternberg. Catherine had three surviving brothers George, Henry and Frederick.

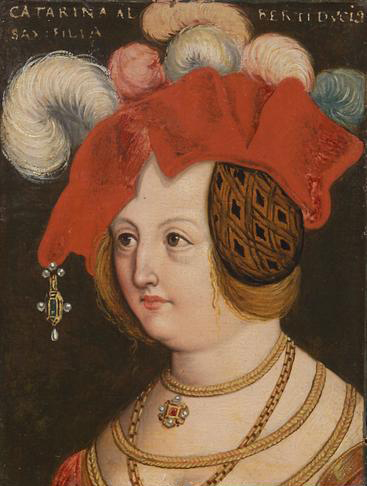
portrait by Anton Boys

At the age of 16, in 1484 at the Innsbruck court, Catherine became the second wife of Archduke Sigismund, who was already 56 years old and regarded as senile. The archduke had previously been married to Princess Eleanor of Scotland, who had left him no surviving children. Likewise, the marriage of Catherine and Sigismund remained childless. Catherine played little part in the politics of Tyrol; moreover, a former lover of Sigismund intrigued against the young bride and falsely claimed in 1487 that Catherine was trying to poison her husband. As the political style of the archduke was no longer tenable, he was gradually losing control over his Tyrolean possessions to his cousin Emperor Frederick III. Constant quarrels with local nobles followed due to the newly introduced limitations Sigismund made. By his resignation in 1490, his wife Catherine had significantly less budget than before. In 1496 Sigismund died.

Soon after the archduke's death on 4 March 1496, Catherine married the Welf duke Eric I of Brunswick-Lüneburg, ruler over the Principality of Calenberg. The marriage produced one short-lived daughter, Anna Maria. Catherine died in 1524 and was buried in St. Blaise's Church, Münden; her tombstone was created by Loy Hering. Duke Eric remarried Elisabeth of Brandenburg and had surviving children.

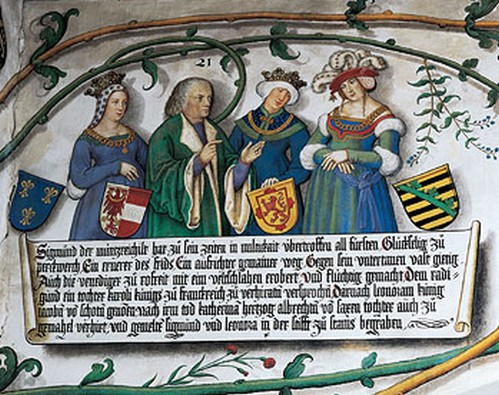
Sigismund, Archduke of Austria and his betrothed Radegonde of Valois and successive wives Eleanor of Scotland and Catherine, Archduchess of Austria.

== Ancestry ==
Ancestors of Catherine of Saxony, Archduchess of Austria

8. Frederick I, Elector of Saxony
4. Frederick II, Elector of Saxony
9. Catherine of Brunswick
2. Albert, Duke of Saxony
10. Ernest, Duke of Austria
5. Margaret of Austria, Electress of Saxony
11. Cymburgis of Masovia
1. Catherine, Archduchess of Austria
12. Victor of Kunštát and Poděbrady
6. George of Kunštát and Podiebrad, King of Bohemia
13. Anna of Wartenberg
3. Sidonie Podiebrad
14. Smil of Sternberg
7. Kunigunde of Sternberg
15. Barbara Flaschka von Richenburg
