= Jehanne d'Orliac =

French writer and poet (1883–1974)

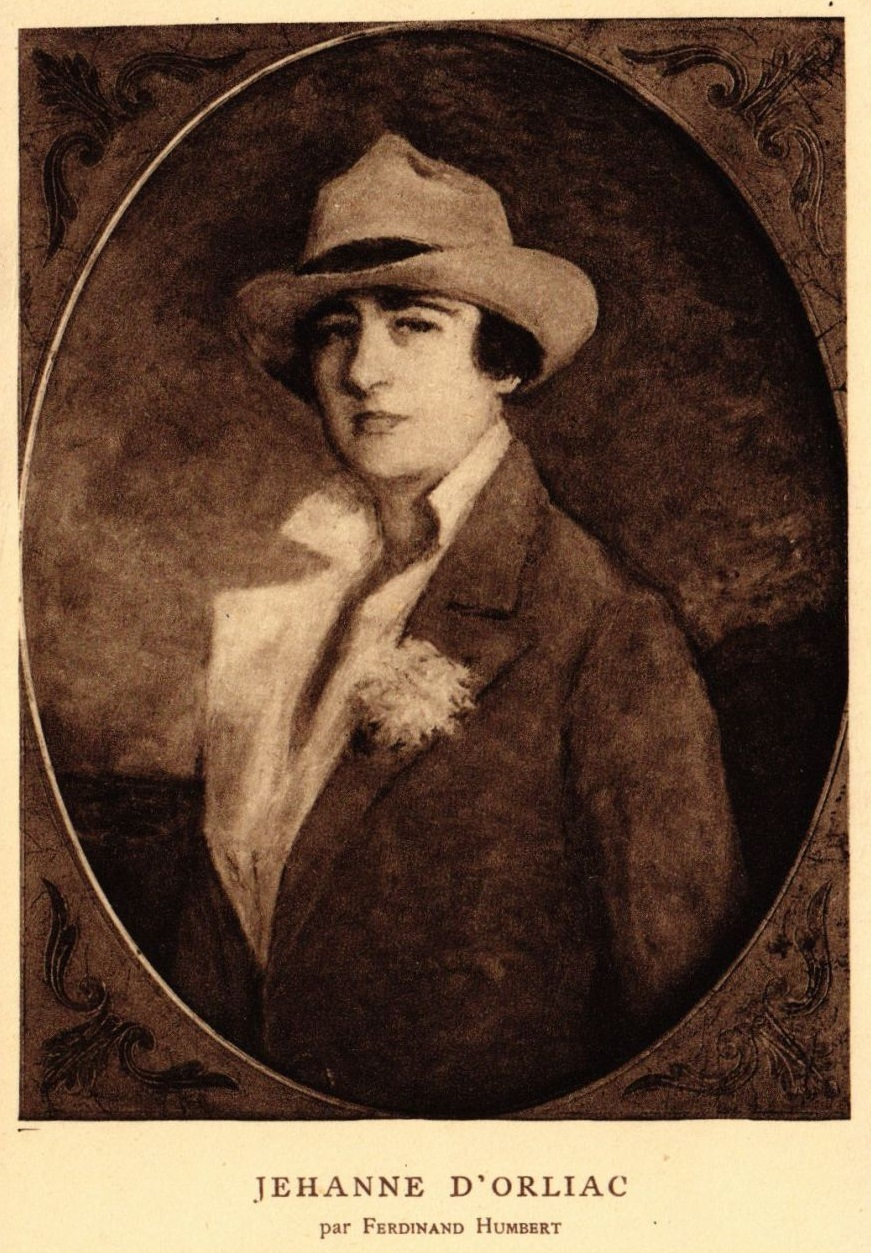
- Portrait of Jehanne d'Orliac by Ferdinand Humbert
- Born: Anne Marie Jeanne Laporte-d'Orliac; 25 May 1883; Compiègne, France
- Died: 26 August 1974 (aged 91); Amboise, France
- Occupations: Writer, dramaturge and poet
- Writing career
- Genre: Historical novel

Jehanne d'Orliac (25 May 1883 – 26 August 1974) was a French writer, dramaturge and poet from Amboise.

== Life ==
d'Orliac was born in Compiègne in 1883, with a father in the military and she moved around during her childhood settling in New Caledonia in 1894. Four years later the family returned to France. She discovered a love for history and began to write. When she was 22, her play François Villon was performed in Paris and well received. It was performed again by the Théâtre de l'Athénée in 1906. In 1907, her new play Joujou tragique and this attracted further interest.

In 1909, Guillaume Apollinaire paid tribute to her writing "Vous avez un talent bien net et non énervé dont je vous félicite en me déclarant votre admirateur." She was influenced by Étienne-François de Choiseul.

In 1934, she wrote a biography of the 15th century French Duchess Yolande d'Anjou, which proved important for posterity as she used sources that were lost during the second World War.

In 1938, she lived in Touraine, where she gave lectures about Pierre de Ronsard, Louis-Claude de Saint-Martin, the monarchs of Sicily and the campaign of Joan of Arc.

She died on 26 August 1974 and her own works were granted to Conseil général d'Indre-et-Loire on 30 April 1976.

== Selected works ==
- François Villon, 1905
- Joujou tragique, 1907
- Lady Chatterly's Second Husband, 1935
