= Victor Martin Le Roy =

French art collector

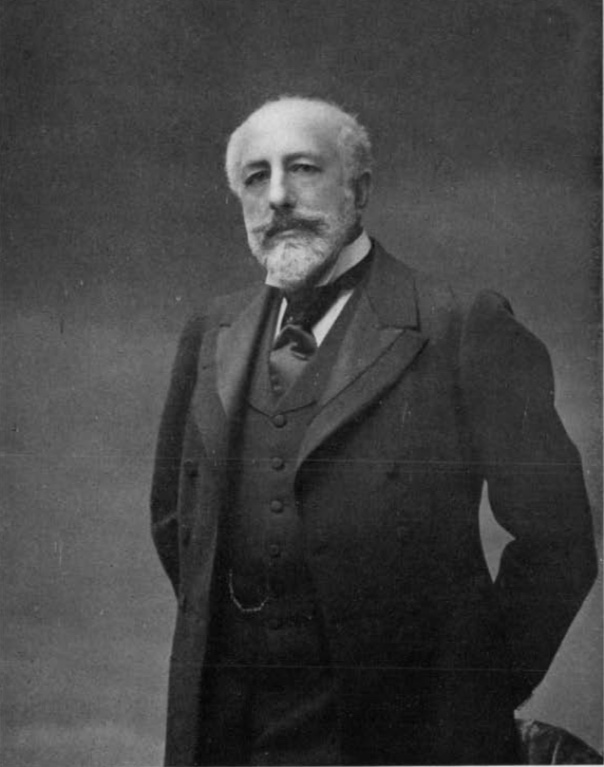
Victor Martin Le Roy

Victor Martin Le Roy (22 May 1842 - 4 April 1918) was a French magistrate at the Court of Auditors, art patron, and art collector. He was one of the founders and directors of the Société des amis du Louvre.

== Bibliography ==
- Catalogue raisonné de la collection Martin Le Roy, publié sous la direction de Jean-Jacques Marquet de Vasselot, Paris, 1906-1909 - 5 volumes.
- Raymond Koechlin, V. Martin Le Roy. Notice lue à l'assemblée générale annuelle de la Société des Amis du Louvre, le 24 mars 1930, 1930
