= Sigismund, Archduke of Austria =

Ruler of Austria from 1439 to 1496

Sigismund
- Archduke of Austria
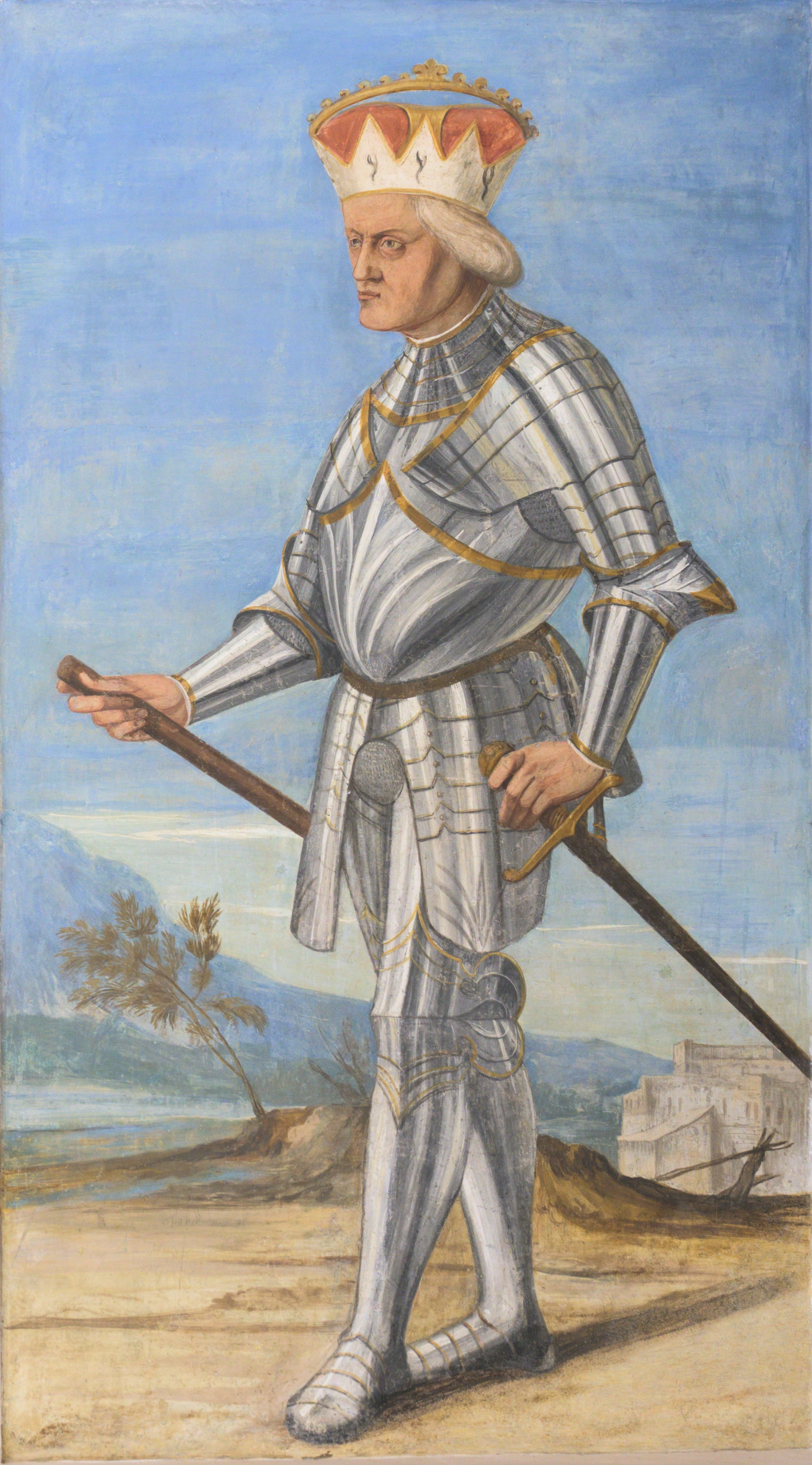
- Portrait by the Archduke Sigismund, Archduke of Habsburg
- Born: 26 October 1427; Innsbruck, Tyrol
- Died: 4 March 1496 (aged 68); Innsbruck
- Burial: Stams Abbey
- Spouse: Eleanor of Scotland; Catherine of Saxony
- House: House of Habsburg
- Father: Frederick IV, Duke of Austria
- Mother: Anna of Brunswick-Lüneburg

Sigismund (26 October 1427 – 4 March 1496), a member of the House of Habsburg, was Duke of Austria from 1439 (elevated to Archduke in 1477) until his death. As a scion of the Habsburg Leopoldian line, he ruled over Further Austria and the County of Tyrol from 1446 until his resignation in 1490.

== Biography ==
Sigismund (or Siegmund, sometimes also spelled Sigmund) was born at the Tyrolean court in Innsbruck; his parents were the Further Austrian duke Frederick IV of Austria and his second wife Anna of Brunswick, a daughter of the Welf duke Frederick I of Brunswick-Lüneburg. A minor upon his father's death in 1439, the Inner Austrian duke Frederick V, Sigismund's first cousin, acted as regent until 1446. Frederick, elected King of the Romans (as Frederick IV) in February 1440, exploited all opportunities to extend his influence over the Further Austrian lands. He also interfered in the Old Zürich War in order to regain the former Habsburg territories lost to the Swiss Confederacy, while the Tyrolean nobles urged him to cede the rule to Sigismund.

The mines of Tyrol remained an important source of revenue for Frederick and not until 1446, upon the end of his regency, Sigismund could accede to rulership over the Further Austrian (Vorderösterreich) possessions, which also included the Swabian territories of the Sundgau in southern Alsace, the Breisgau, and numerous smaller estates. His cousin had planned to marry him off to the French princess Radegonde, a daughter of King Charles VII the Victorious, however, she died in 1445. Sigismund, represented by Ludwig von Landsee, married Princess Eleanor of Scotland, the daughter of the Stuart king James I, on 8 September 1449, in an Augustinian church near Chinon.

Sigismund was able to acquire large parts of the former County of Bregenz (in present-day Vorarlberg) in 1451 and further estates in the Großwalsertal and Kleinwalsertal. Nevertheless, he had to cope with claims raised by Frederick's brother, Archduke Albert VI of Austria, and temporarily had to cede the rule over several Further Austrian territories to him. For much of his reign, he was engaged in disputes with Nicholas of Cusa, then Prince-bishop of Brixen and raised to Cardinal in 1449, for the control of the Tyrolean Eisack, Puster and Inn valleys. Sigismund sided with Nicholas' opponent Gregory of Heimburg and in 1460, when he marched against the bishop's residence at Bruneck Castle, he was excommunicated by Pope Pius II. Nicholas fled to Todi in the Papal States, but fell ill and died in 1464, before the archduke surrendered in order to receive the papal pardon.

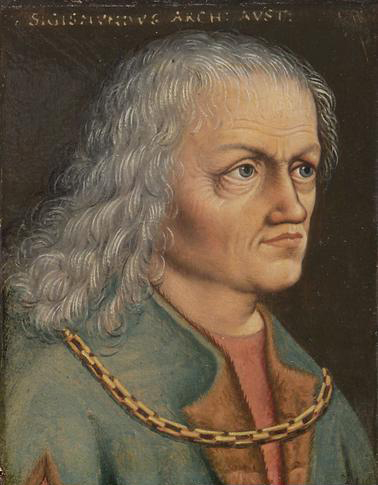
Sigismund of Austria

In 1469, Sigismund sold several of his Swabian lands on the Rhine river, including the Alsace landgraviate, the County of Pfirt (Ferrette), the Breisgau and further cities, to the Burgundian Duke Charles the Bold. Sources are unclear, whether he sold them due to his debts he had accumulated owing to his luxurious lifestyle, or just "rented" them because he wanted to have them protected better against the expansion of the Swiss Confederacy. In turn, he extended his Vorarlberg possessions, purchasing the County of Sonnenberg in 1474 and, together with the Swiss (with whom he had concluded a peace treaty in Konstanz) and the Alsatian cities, he sided against Duke Charles of Burgundy in the Battle of Héricourt.

In 1477, his cousin Frederick, crowned Holy Roman Emperor in 1452, elevated him to Archduke. Three years later, Princess Eleanor died, and in 1484, Sigismund married the 16-year-old Catherine of Saxony, daughter of the Wettin duke Albert III of Saxony. He had no offspring from either marriage.

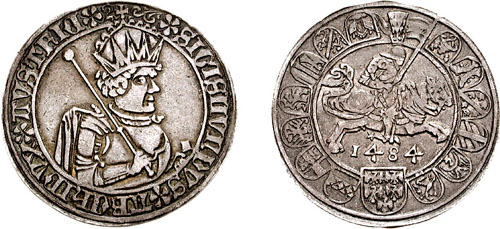
A half guldengroschen from 1484.

In the later years of the 1470s and early 1480s Sigismund issued a decree that instituted a radical coinage reformation that eventually led up to the creation of the world's first really large and heavy silver coin in nearly a millennium, the guldengroschen, which the Habsburgs in Bohemia developed later into the thaler. This coin was the ancestor of many of the major European coin denominations to come later and also of the US dollar. Using new mining methods and technology, the largely quiescent silver mines in Tirol were brought back into production and soon numerous surrounding states were re-opening old mines and minting similar coins. This production of large coinage exploded as silver from Spain's colonies in the Americas flooded the European economy. It is from these reforms in part that Sigismund acquired the nickname of der Münzreiche, or "rich in coin".

Sigismund was easily swayed by the bad advice of his council and in March 1487 entered into a pointless war with the Republic of Venice, sometimes called the War of Rovereto. Tyrolean forces quickly seized silver mines in the Valsugana valley owned by Venice, and in April 1487 Sigismund outraged Venice further when he imprisoned 130 Venetian merchants traveling to the fair at Bozen (modern Bolzano) and confiscated their goods. Tyrol stormed the Pass of Calliano and later besieged the castle at Rovereto using a massive bombard, one of the earliest times such a large piece had been used in warfare. The war continued through summer but ended with no decisive victory for either side. One notable casualty of the conflict was the condottiero Roberto Sanseverino d'Aragona.

By 1490 the opposition of Tyrolean nobles compelled Sigismund to hand over the rulership to Frederick's son Archduke Maximilian, who later succeeded his father as Holy Roman Emperor. Whether Sigismund voluntarily handed over power to Maximilian or was strongly coerced by the latter is not clear. With Sigismund's death in 1496, the Tyrolean branch of the Habsburg Leopoldian line became extinct, leaving Archduke Maximilian as sole heir to all the dynasty's possessions.

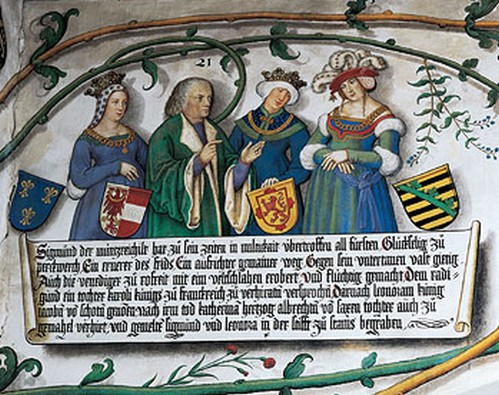
Sigismund, Archduke of Austria and his betrothed Radegonde of Valois and successive wives Eleanor of Scotland and Catherine, Archduchess of Austria.

== Male-line family tree ==
House of Habsburg

Original line
Albert; Count of Habsburg c. 1188–1239
Rudolf I of Germany c. 1218–1291
Albert I of Germany; 1255–1308	Hartmann; 1263–1281	Rudolf II; Duke of Austria; 1270–1290
Rudolf I of Bohemia; 1281–1307	Frederick the Fair c. 1289–1330	Leopold I Duke of Austria; 1290–1326	Albert II; Duke of Austria; 1298–1358	Henry the Friendly; 1299–1327	Otto; Duke of Austria; 1301–1339	John; Parricida c. 1290–1312/1313
Albertinian line	Leopoldian line
Rudolf IV; Duke of Austria; 1339–1365	Frederick III; 1347–1362	Albert III; Duke of Austria; 1349–1395	Leopold III; Duke of Austria; 1351–1386	Frederick II; Duke of Austria; 1327–1344	Leopold II; Duke of Austria; 1328–1344
Albert IV; Duke of Austria; 1377–1404	William; Duke of Austria c. 1370–1406	Leopold IV; Duke of Austria; 1371–1411	Ernest; Duke of Austria; 1377–1424	Frederick IV; Duke of Austria; 1382–1439
Albert II of Germany; 1397–1439	Frederick III; HRE; 1415–1493	Albert VI; Archduke of Austria; 1418–1463	Sigismund; Archduke of Austria; 1427–1496
Ladislaus the Posthumous; 1440–1457	Maximilian I HRE; 1459–1519
Philip I of Castile; 1478–1506
Spanish / Iberian line	Austrian / HRE line
Charles V HRE; 1500–1558	Ferdinand I HRE; 1503–1564
Philip II of Spain; 1527–1598	Maximilian II; HRE; 1527–1576	Ferdinand II; Archduke of Austria; 1529–1595	Charles II; Archduke of Austria; 1540–1590
Carlos; Prince of Asturias; 1545–1568	Philip III of Spain; 1578–1621	Rudolf II; HRE; 1552–1612	Ernest of Austria; 1553–1595	Matthias; HRE; 1557–1619	Maximilian III; Archduke of Austria; 1558–1618	Albert VII; Archduke of Austria; 1559–1621	Wenceslaus; Archduke of Austria; 1561–1578	Andrew; Margrave of Burgau; 1558–1600	Charles; Margrave of Burgau; 1560–1618	Ferdinand II; HRE; 1578–1637	Maximilian Ernest of Austria; 1583–1616	Leopold V Archduke of Austria; 1586–1632	Charles of Austria; 1590–1624
Philip IV of Spain; 1605–1665	Charles of Austria; 1607–1632	Ferdinand of Austria; 1609–1641	John-Charles of Austria; 1605–1619	Ferdinand III; HRE; 1608–1657	Leopold Wilhelm of Austria; 1614–1662	Ferdinand Charles; Archduke of Austria; 1628–1662	Sigismund Francis; Archduke of Austria; 1630–1665
Balthasar Charles; Prince of Asturias; 1629–1646	Charles II of Spain; 1661–1700	Ferdinand IV; King of the Romans; 1633–1654	Leopold I HRE; 1640–1705	Charles Joseph of Austria; 1649–1664
Joseph I HRE; 1678–1711	Charles VI; HRE; 1685–1740
Lorraine
Maria Theresa; HRE; 1740–1780	Francis I HRE; 1745–1765
Habsburg-Lorraine
Joseph II; HRE; 1765–1790	Leopold II; HRE; 1790–1792
Francis II; HRE; 1792–1806

== See also ==
- Burgundy Wars
- Sigmundskron Castle

Sigismund, Archduke of Austria House of Habsburg Born: 26 October 1427 Died: 4 March 1496
Regnal titles
Preceded by Frederick IV	Duke of Further Austria; Count of Tyrol; 1439–1490	Succeeded by Maximilian I
