= Charles VII of France =

King of France from 1422 to 1461

Charles VII
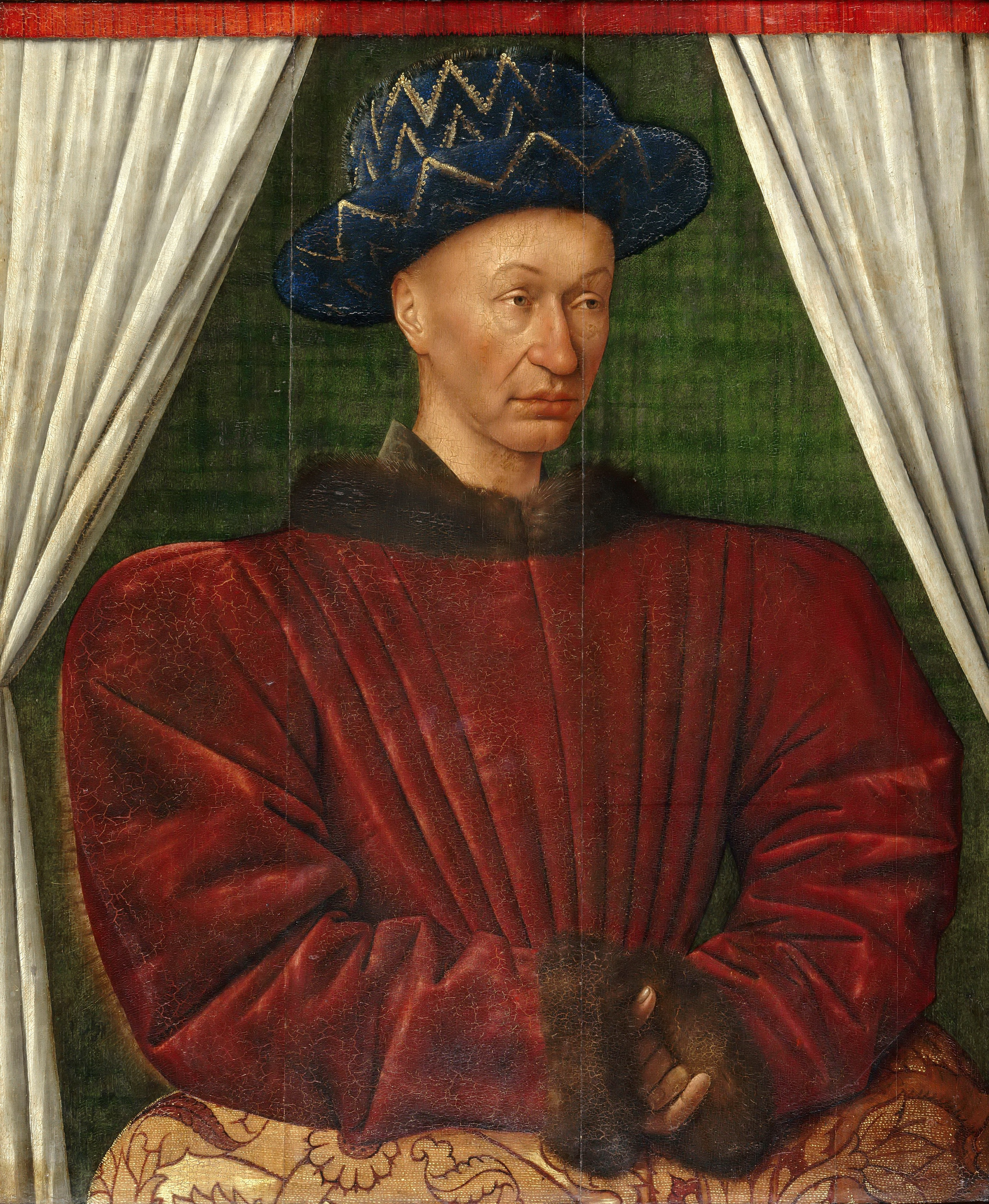
- Portrait by Jean Fouquet, tempera on wood, Louvre Museum, Paris, c. 1445–1450

King of France
- Reign: 21 October 1422 – 22 July 1461
- Coronation: 17 July 1429
- Predecessor: Charles VI
- Successor: Louis XI
- Contender: Henry VI of England (1422–53)
- Born: Charles, comte de Ponthieu; 22 February 1403; Paris, France
- Died: 22 July 1461 (aged 58); Mehun-sur-Yèvre, France
- Burial: 7 August 1461; Basilica of Saint-Denis
- Spouse: Marie of Anjou (m. 1422)
- Issue Detail: Louis XI, King of France; Radegonde of Valois; Catherine, Countess of Charolais; Yolande, Duchess of Savoy; Joan, Duchess of Bourbon; Magdalena, Princess of Viana; Charles, Duke of Berry; Illegitimate: Marie, Countess of Taillebourg; Charlotte, Countess of Maulévier
- House: Valois
- Father: Charles VI of France
- Mother: Isabeau of Bavaria

Charles VII (22 February 1403 – 22 July 1461), called the Victorious (French: le Victorieux) or the Well-Served (le Bien-Servi), was King of France from 1422 to his death in 1461. His reign saw the end of the Hundred Years' War and a de facto end of the English claims to the French throne.

During the Hundred Years' War, Charles VII inherited the throne of France under desperate circumstances. Forces of the Kingdom of England and the duke of Burgundy occupied Guyenne and northern France, including Paris, the capital and most populous city, and Reims, the city in which French kings were traditionally crowned. In addition, his father, Charles VI, had disinherited him in 1420 and recognized Henry V of England and his heirs as the legitimate successors to the French crown. At the same time, a civil war raged in France between the Armagnacs (supporters of the House of Valois) and the Burgundian party (supporters of the House of Valois-Burgundy, which was allied to the English).

With his court removed to Bourges, south of the Loire river, Charles was disparagingly called the "King of Bourges", because the area around this city was one of the few remaining regions left to him. However, his political and military position improved dramatically with the emergence of Joan of Arc as a spiritual leader in France. Joan and Jean de Dunois led French troops to lift the siege of Orléans and other besieged strategic cities on the Loire river, and to defeat the English at the Battle of Patay. With local English troops dispersed, the people of Reims switched allegiance and opened their gates, which enabled Charles VII to be crowned at Reims Cathedral in 1429. Six years later, he ended the Anglo-Burgundian alliance by signing the Treaty of Arras with Burgundy, followed by the recovery of Paris in 1436 and the steady reconquest of Normandy in the 1440s using a newly organized professional army and advanced siege cannons. Following the Battle of Castillon in 1453, the French recaptured all of England's continental possessions except the Pale of Calais.

The last years of Charles VII were marked by conflicts with his turbulent son, the future Louis XI.

== Early life ==
Born at the Hôtel Saint-Pol, the royal residence in Paris, Charles was given the title of Count of Ponthieu six months after his birth in 1403. He was the eleventh child and fifth son of Charles VI of France and Isabeau of Bavaria. Isabeau was known to be unfaithful to her husband and had a scandalous affair with her brother-in-law Louis I, Duke of Orléans. Charles allegedly doubted his own parentage, and after he became Dauphin of France his enemies questioned his legitimacy. However, Charles's modern biographer Malcolm Vale writes that there is "absolutely no concrete evidence to suggest that Charles was not the king's son", and even his supposed doubts can be connected instead with his later disinheritance by his own father in January 1421.

On 18 December 1413, Charles was betrothed to Marie of Anjou, daughter of Duke Louis II of Anjou and Yolande of Aragon. This match connected the large House of Valois-Anjou to the Crown. In his early years, Charles was under the influence of his future mother-in-law, and he began a life-long association with his future brother-in-law René of Anjou. Charles's four elder brothers, Charles (1386), Charles (1392–1401), Louis (1397–1415) and John (1398–1417) had each held the title of Dauphin as heirs apparent to the French throne in turn. All died childless, leaving Charles with a rich inheritance of titles.

== Dauphin ==
Charles began his political career at a difficult time for France. Henry V of England, who claimed the French throne and had recently defeated the French at the Battle of Agincourt, was about to begin another campaign in Normandy. Meanwhile, France was divided between the hostile Armagnac (supporters of Charles's cousin Charles I, Duke of Orléans) and Burgundian (partisans of John the Fearless, Duke of Burgundy) parties, who fought for control over the insane King Charles VI. As Dauphin, Charles became the figurehead of the Armagnac party, which controlled Paris since 1413; in fact, he was under the influence of Bernard VII, Count of Armagnac (father-in-law to the Duke of Orléans). Charles quarreled with his mother and exiled her from Paris. On 29 May 1418, he was taken away from Paris by his servants Tanneguy du Châtel and Guillaume d'Avaugour after the Burgundians entered the city and staged a coup d'état against the Armagnacs, securing control over the King. The Count of Armagnac was murdered along with around 2,500 of his supporters. (Note: Reports of the number killed vary greatly. According to one modern historian, the most likely number is about 2,500.) The fifteen-year-old Charles became the Armagnac leader and on 29 June took the title of lieutenant-general of France. On 26 December 1418, he claimed the title of Regent of France, proclaiming himself a sovereign ruler.

Charles established his own court in Bourges and a Parlement in Poitiers. John the Fearless thought the Dauphin was weak and trusting and sought a peace that would allow them to rally against the English. On 11 July, Charles and John the Fearless attempted a reconciliation on a small bridge near Pouilly-le-Fort, not far from Melun where Charles was staying. They signed the Treaty of Pouilly-le-Fort in which they would share authority of the government, assist each other and not to form any treaties without the other's consent. Charles and John also decided that a further meeting should take place the following 10 September. On that date, they met on the bridge at Montereau. The Duke assumed that the meeting would be entirely peaceful and diplomatic; thus, he brought only a small escort with him. The Dauphin's men reacted to the Duke's arrival by attacking and killing him. Charles's level of involvement has remained uncertain to this day. Although he claimed to have been unaware of his men's intentions, this was considered unlikely by those who heard of the murder. The assassination marked the end of any attempt of a reconciliation between the Armagnac and Burgundian factions, thus strengthening the position of Henry V of England. Charles was later required by a treaty with Philip the Good, the son of John the Fearless, to apologize for the murder of the previous duke, which he did through a representative.

== Treaty of Troyes (1420) ==
At the death of Charles' father Charles VI in October 1422, the succession was cast into doubt. Under the Treaty of Troyes, signed by Charles VI on 21 May 1420, the throne would pass to Henry V or his heir. Henry had died in July 1422: his heir was the infant King Henry VI of England, son of Henry and Charles VI's daughter Catherine of Valois. However, Frenchmen loyal to the Valois regarded the treaty as invalid on grounds of coercion and Charles VI's diminished mental capacity. Those who did not recognize the treaty and believed the Dauphin Charles to be of legitimate birth considered him the rightful heir to the throne. Those who considered Charles illegitimate recognized as the rightful heir Charles, Duke of Orléans, cousin of the Dauphin, who was in English captivity. Only the supporters of Henry VI and the Dauphin Charles were able to enlist sufficient military force to press effectively for their candidates. The English, already in control of northern France, enforced Henry's claim in the regions of France that they occupied. Northern France, including Paris, was thus ruled by an English regent, Henry V's brother, John of Lancaster, Duke of Bedford, based in Normandy (see Dual monarchy of England and France).

== King of Bourges ==
1429 Territories controlled by Henry VI of England Territories controlled by the Duke of Burgundy Territories controlled by Charles Main battles English raid of 1415 Joan of Arc's route to Reims in 1429

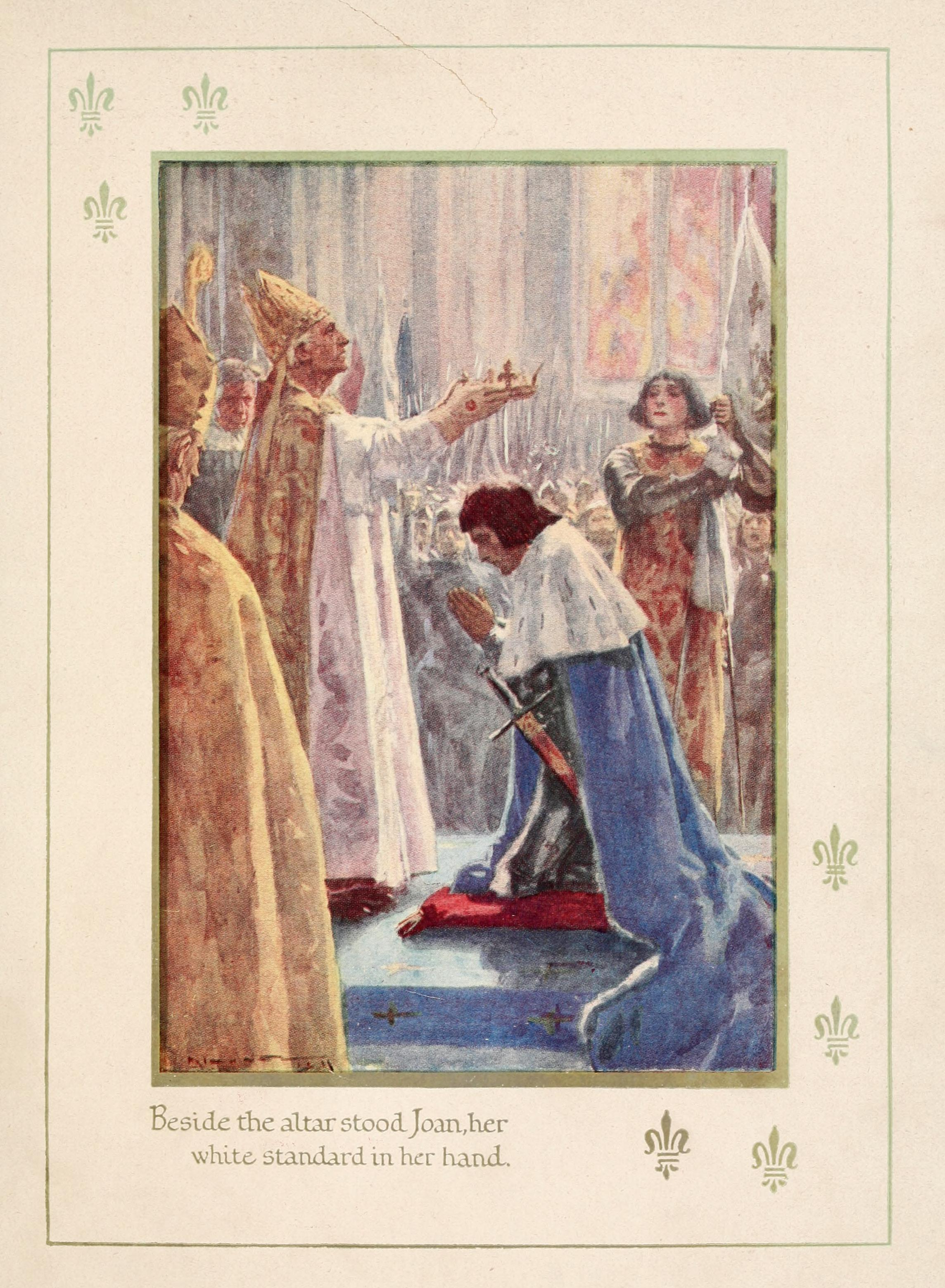
A 20th-century illustration depicting Joan of Arc at the coronation of Charles VII with her white flag

On 25 June 1421, he took Gallardon and executed the garrison as traitors. By the end of June, he had invested Chartres. He then went south of the Loire River under the protection of Yolande of Aragon, known as "Queen of the Four Kingdoms" and, on 18 December 1422, married her daughter, Marie of Anjou, to whom he had been engaged since December 1413 in a ceremony at the Louvre Palace.

Charles claimed the title King of France for himself, but failed to make any attempts to expel the English from northern France out of indecision and a sense of hopelessness. Instead, he remained south of the Loire River, where he was still able to exert power, and maintained an itinerant court in the Loire Valley at castles such as Chinon. He was still customarily known as the "Dauphin", or derisively as the "King of Bourges", after the town where he generally lived. Periodically, he considered flight to the Iberian Peninsula, which would have allowed the English to capture even more territory in France.

=== Siege of Orléans ===
Political conditions in France took a decisive turn in the year 1429 just as the prospects for the Dauphin began to look hopeless. The town of Orléans had been under siege since October 1428. The English regent, the Duke of Bedford (the uncle of Henry VI), was advancing into the Duchy of Bar, ruled by Charles's brother-in-law, René. The French lords and soldiers loyal to Charles were becoming increasingly desperate. Then in the little village of Domrémy, on the border of Lorraine and Champagne, a teenage girl named Joan of Arc (French: Jeanne d'Arc), demanded that the garrison commander at Vaucouleurs, Robert de Baudricourt, collect the soldiers and resources necessary to bring her to the Dauphin at Chinon, stating that visions of angels and saints had given her a divine mission. Granted an escort of five veteran soldiers and a letter of referral to Charles by Lord Baudricourt, Joan rode to see Charles at Chinon. She arrived on 23 February 1429.

Simon Charles, the president of the royal treasury who arrived at Chinon not long after Joan's first meeting with the Dauphin, gave an account of the meeting at Joan's rehabilitation trial: "When the king knew that she was going to come, he withdrew slightly from the crowd; Joan nonetheless recognized him and made her reverence to him, speaking with him for some time. After hearing her, the king seemed radiant." (Note: Other accounts give a more elaborate version of the meeting. Jean Chartier, a contemporary chronicler, wrote: "Then Joan, having come before the king, made the curtsies and reverences that customarily are made to a king as though she had been nourished at the court and, her greeting having been delivered, said in addressing the king, 'God give you life, gentle King,' even though she did not know him and had never seen him, and there were many pompous lords there more opulently dressed than was the king. Wherefore he replied to Joan: 'What if I am not the king, Joan?' Pointing to one of the lords, he said: 'There is the king.' To which she answered, 'In God's name, gentle Prince, it is you and none other.' ") According to Friar Jean Pasquerel, Joan's confessor who heard her own account of the meeting, "the king said to his courtiers that Joan had told him a certain secret that no one knew or could know except God; and that is why he had great confidence in her." What this secret was has been the subject of much speculation. (Note: A later work by Pierre Sala which appeared in 1516 records an anecdote according to which Joan told the king the contents of a silent prayer he had made in 1428. Sala claimed to have heard this from Guillaume Gouffier, a former chamberlain of Charles VII; Gouffier, who only entered the King's service in 1444, claimed to have heard it from the King himself.) It was later alleged during Joan's trial that she showed some "sign" to Charles which convinced him of his legitimacy. What is clear is that after the meeting Charles was willing to allow Joan to undertake her stated mission: to lift the siege of Orléans and to have Charles crowned at Reims.

After her encounter with Charles in March 1429, Joan of Arc set out to lead the French forces at Orléans. She was aided by skilled commanders such as Étienne de Vignolles, known as La Hire, and Jean Poton de Xaintrailles. They compelled the English to lift the siege on 8 May 1429, thus turning the tide of the war. The French won the Battle of Patay on 18 June, at which the English army present lost about half its troops. After pushing further into English and Burgundian-controlled territory, Charles was crowned King Charles VII of France in Reims Cathedral on 17 July 1429.

Joan was later captured by Burgundian troops under John of Luxembourg at the Siege of Compiègne on 24 May 1430. The Burgundians handed her over to their English allies. Tried for heresy by a court composed of pro-English clergymen such as Pierre Cauchon, who had long served under English authorities, she was burnt at the stake on 30 May 1431. Charles took no action to save Joan, "an inaction for which he has ever since been condemned by Joan’s friends and admirers."

== French victory ==
Nearly as vital as Joan of Arc to the cause of Charles was the support of the powerful and wealthy family of his wife Marie d'Anjou, particularly his mother-in-law, Queen Yolande of Aragon.

On 5 August 1435, a diplomatic congress was held at Arras, in Burgundian territory. Philip the Good, seeing no further use in his alliance with England, was ready to come to terms with Charles VII. Charles and Philip signed the Treaty of Arras, by which the Burgundian faction rejected their alliance with England and became reconciled with the French king. The terms of the treaty were personally humiliating for Charles. He was obliged to apologize through a representative for the murder of Philip's father in 1418 and state that "at the time, he had been very young, possessed little understanding, and lacked the wisdom to prevent the event." Additionally, Philip was not required to pay homage to Charles and was allowed to keep all of his recently acquired territories. The treaty amounted to acceptance of the almost complete independence of the duke of Burgundy. Nevertheless, with this treaty Charles attained the essential goal of ensuring that no Prince of the Blood recognised Henry VI as King of France. In the long term, it opened up the way for Charles's ultimate victory over the English. Over the following two decades, the French recaptured Paris from the English and eventually recovered all of France with the exception of the northern port of Calais.

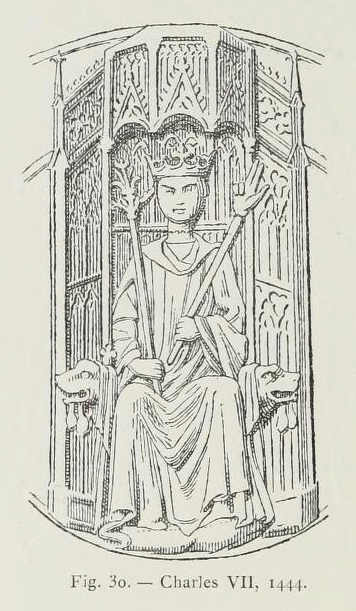
Charles VII depicted in 1444

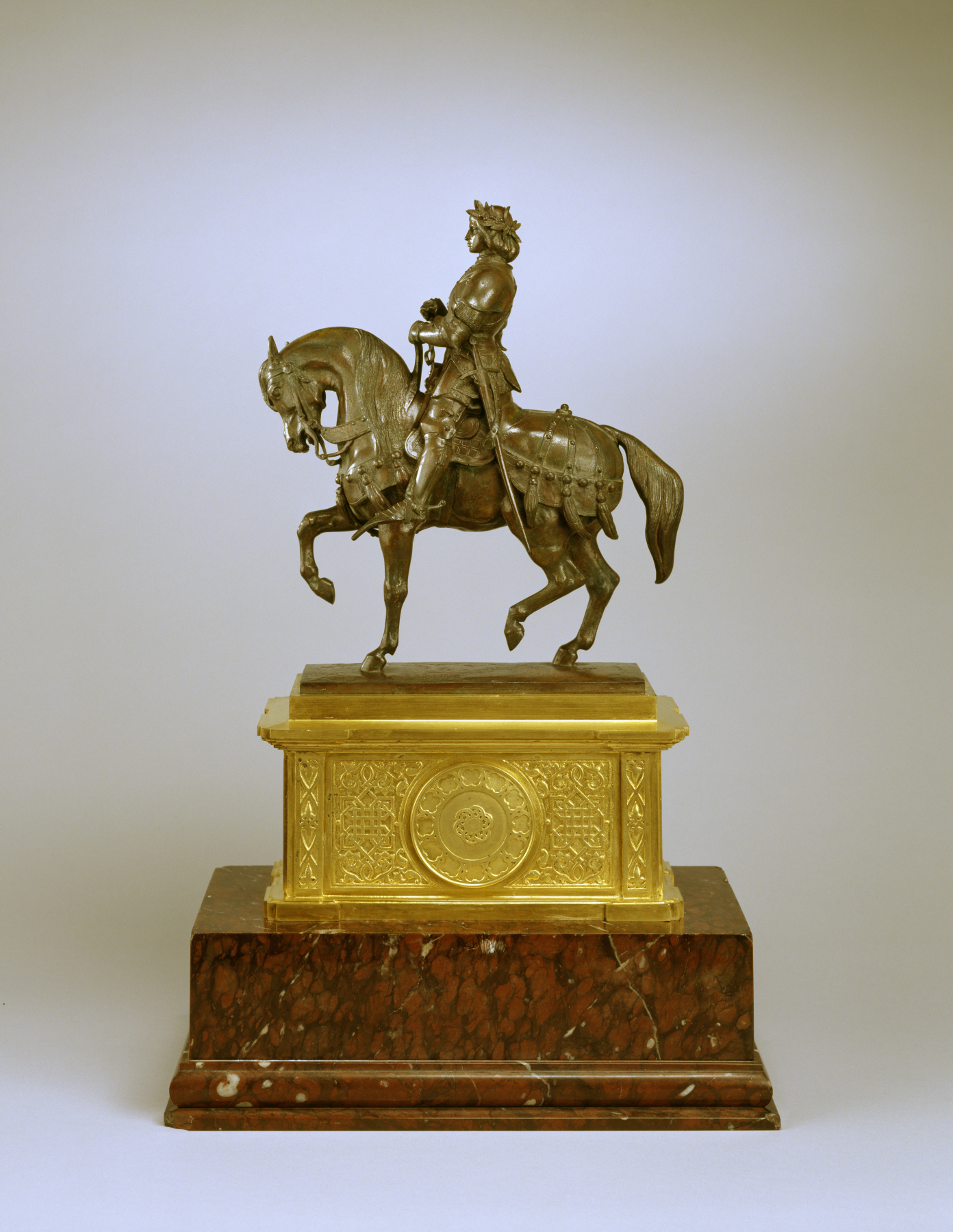
Charles VII the Victorious by Antoine-Louis Barye, held in the Walters Art Museum, Baltimore

Charles entered Paris without resistance on 13 April 1436. The unified Parlement and the Chamber of Accounts, previously divided between the claimants to the throne, was now restored to Paris, although Charles stayed with his government in the Loire Valley. He enacted governmental and military reforms, dismissing Georges de La Trémoille, the worst of the royal favourites who had greatly influenced him in previous years, and appointing better advisers like Arthur de Richemont and Jacques Cœur. The former was a noble (he later became the duke of Brittany) who successfully commanded the French armies in the 1430s and oversaw the reform of the army in 1440s. The latter was a merchant who financed Charles's campaigns. (Note: Later, in 1451, Cœur was accused of poisoning the king's mistress Agnès Sorel and arrested; the charge was never substantiated, but a royal edict ultimately declared him guilty of financial peculation, breaking of royal ordinances, lèse-majesté, and "other crimes". His seized wealth (he held assets valued at some 3,500 florins) funded the reconquest of Normandy and Guyenne.) In 1438, Charles claimed royal control of ecclesiastical appointments and revenues through the Pragmatic Sanction of Bourges. The next year, he received approval from the Estates-General for new taxes and issued the first of his ordinances for the reform of the army. However, in 1440 Charles's efforts to expand royal authority provoked a revolt by the nobility known as the Praguerie, which also involved his son Louis, the Dauphin.

Charles VII's military reforms have attracted considerable attention from historians. In 1439, a royal decree established the Crown's exclusive right to raise troops in an attempt to suppress private armies and armed bands, although this was not easy to enforce. (During the years of war, mobile bands of soldiers called écorcheurs (Note: From the French écorcher 'to flay, skin'.) preyed upon the countryside, and mercenary garrisons extorted money from the provinces.) The reforms involved the formation, between 1445 and 1448, of a 12,000 strong cavalry force, called the companies of grande and petite ordonnance. This force was not intended to be a standing army, but rather to recover the English-occupied territories and address military disorder. An infantry force of francs-archers was assembled in 1448 by conscription. Many of the members of the new French army were already professional soldiers, and some were "nothing more than old écorcheurs ". The reforms were successful in establishing some degree of control over the unruly soldiery and reducing the influence of magnates in the military. This came at a high financial cost; the later author Philippe de Commines estimated that over half of the 1,800,000 francs raised annually by the Crown was spent on the army.

By 1444, the English had been confined to Normandy, Calais, and Aquitaine, and a ten-year truce was signed at Tours. Charles's reforms had given him the power necessary to achieve a final victory. On 17 July 1449, he alleged that the English had broken the truce and resumed warfare. The French won major victories at the battles of Formigny (15 April 1450) and Castillon (27 July 1453), which allowed for the swift capture of Normandy and then of Aquitaine. Only Calais remained in English hands. Although no peace or truce was signed by the two kings, the Wars of the Roses (1453–1483) prevented England from trying to recover its lost territories.

== Later reign and death ==
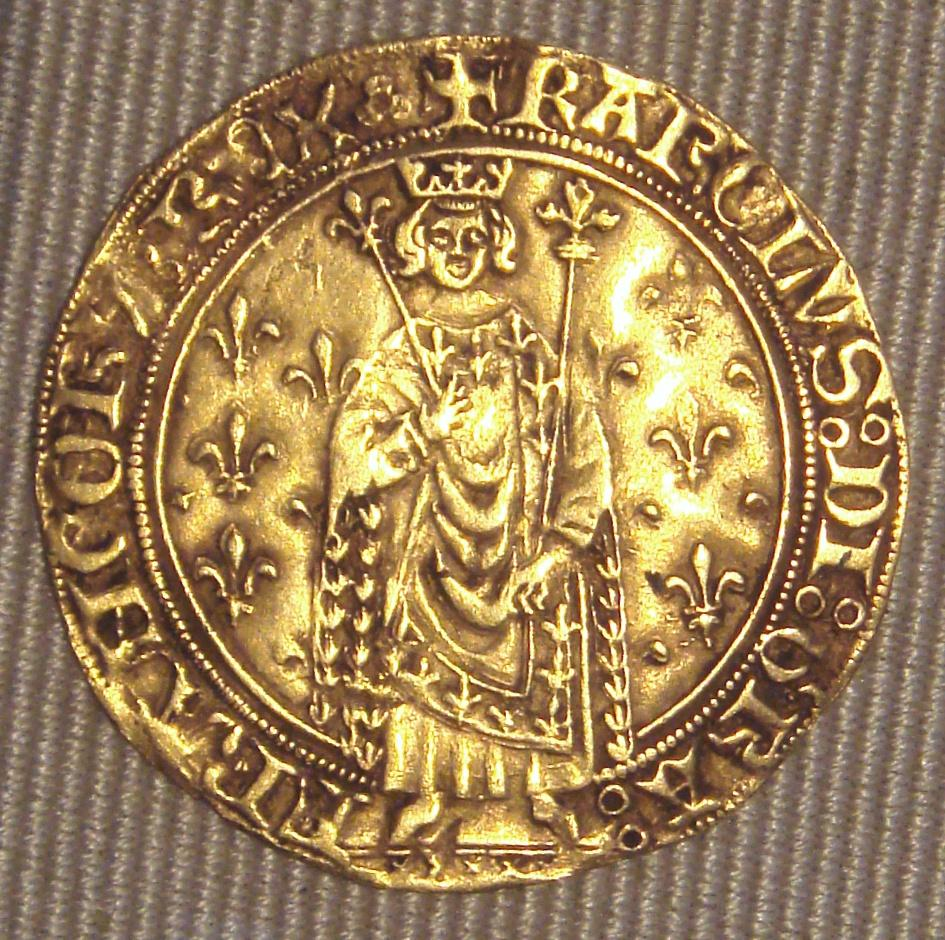
Charles VII Royal d'or.

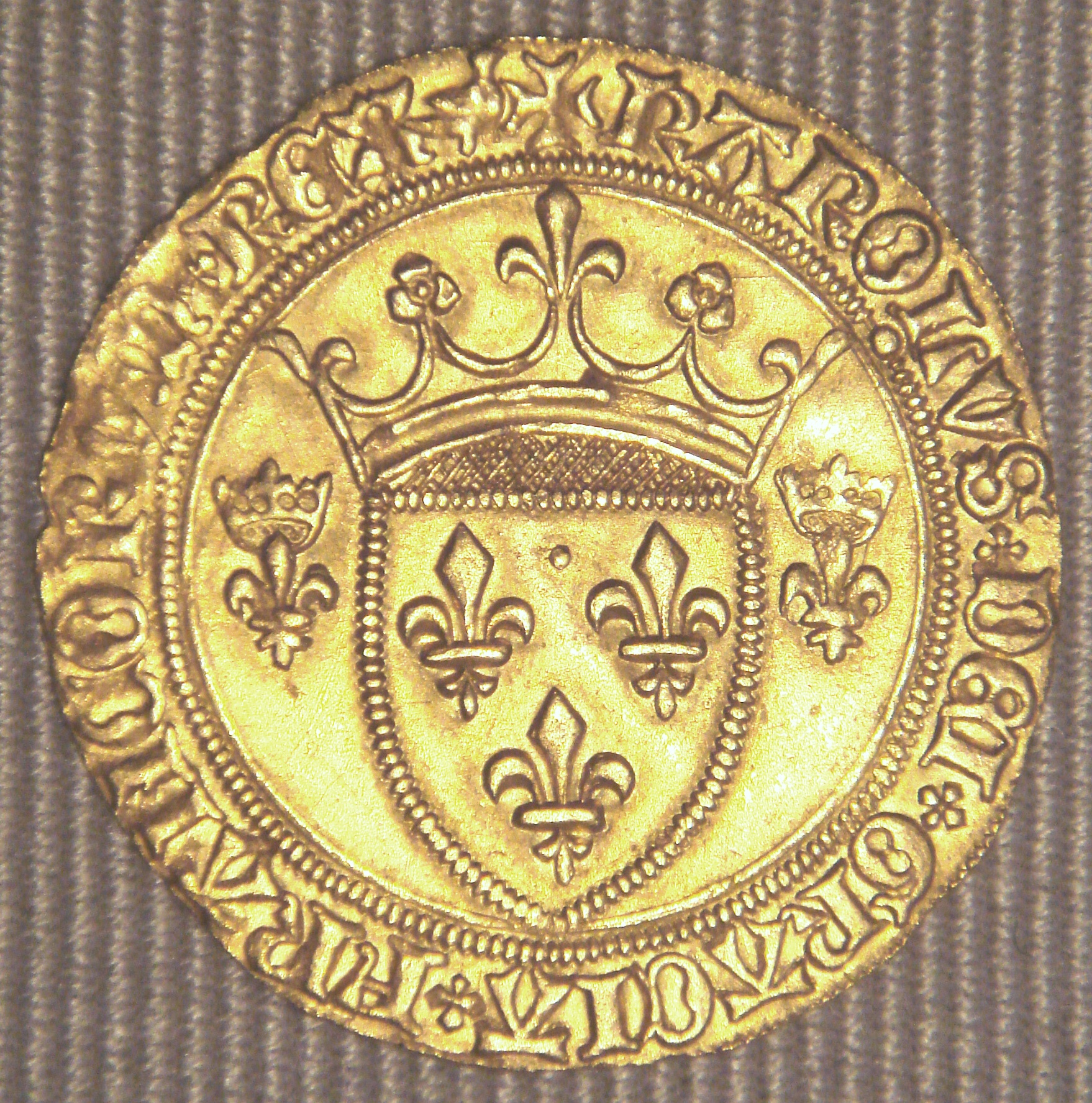
Charles VII Ecu neuf, 1436

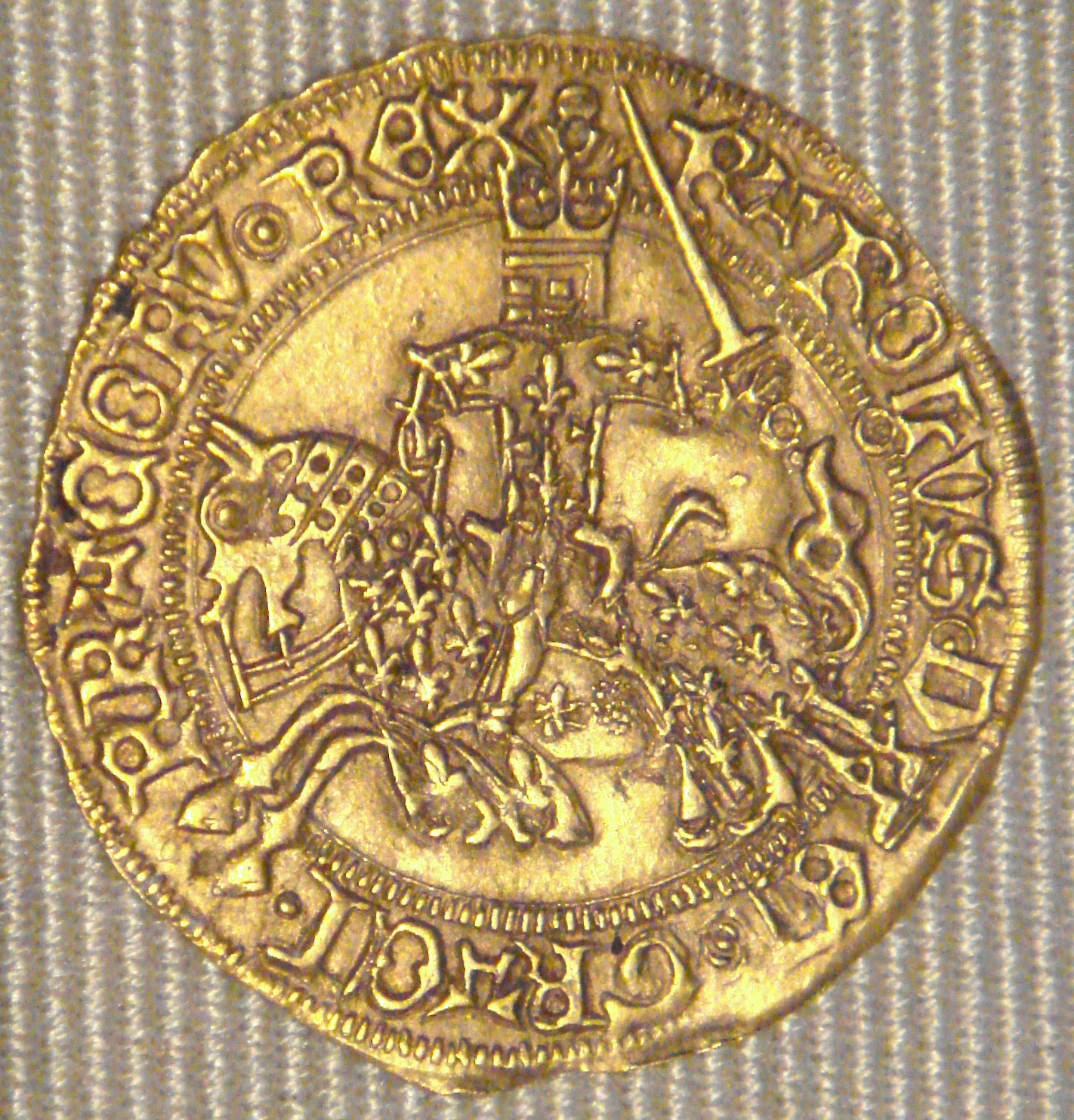
Charles VII on a Franc à cheval from 1422 or 1423

Charles's later years were marked by hostile relations with his heir, Louis, who demanded real power to accompany his position as the Dauphin. Charles consistently refused him. Accordingly, Louis stirred up dissent and fomented plots in attempts to destabilise his father's reign. He quarrelled with his father's mistress, Agnès Sorel, and on one occasion drove her with a bared sword into Charles' bed, according to one source. Eventually, in 1446, after Charles's last son, also named Charles, was born, the king banished the Dauphin to the Dauphiné. The two never met again. Louis thereafter refused the king's demands to return to court, and he eventually fled to the protection of Philip the Good, Duke of Burgundy, in 1456.

In 1458, Charles became ill. A sore on his leg (an early symptom, perhaps, of diabetes or another condition) refused to heal, and the infection in it caused a serious fever. The king summoned Louis to him from his exile in Burgundy, but the Dauphin refused to come. He employed astrologers to foretell the exact hour of his father's death. The king lingered on for the next two and a half years, increasingly ill, but unwilling to die. During this time he also had to deal with the case of his rebellious vassal John V of Armagnac.

Finally, however, there came a point in July 1461 when the king's physicians concluded that Charles would not live past August. Ill and weary, the king became delirious, convinced that he was surrounded by traitors loyal only to his son. Under the pressure of sickness and fever, he went mad. By now another infection in his jaw had caused an abscess in his mouth. The swelling caused by this became so large that, for the last week of his life, Charles was unable to swallow food or water. Although he asked the Dauphin to come to his deathbed, Louis refused, instead waiting at Avesnes, in Burgundy, for his father to die. At Mehun-sur-Yèvre, attended by his younger son, Charles, and aware of his elder son's final betrayal, the King starved to death. He died on 22 July 1461, and was buried, at his request, beside his parents in Saint-Denis.

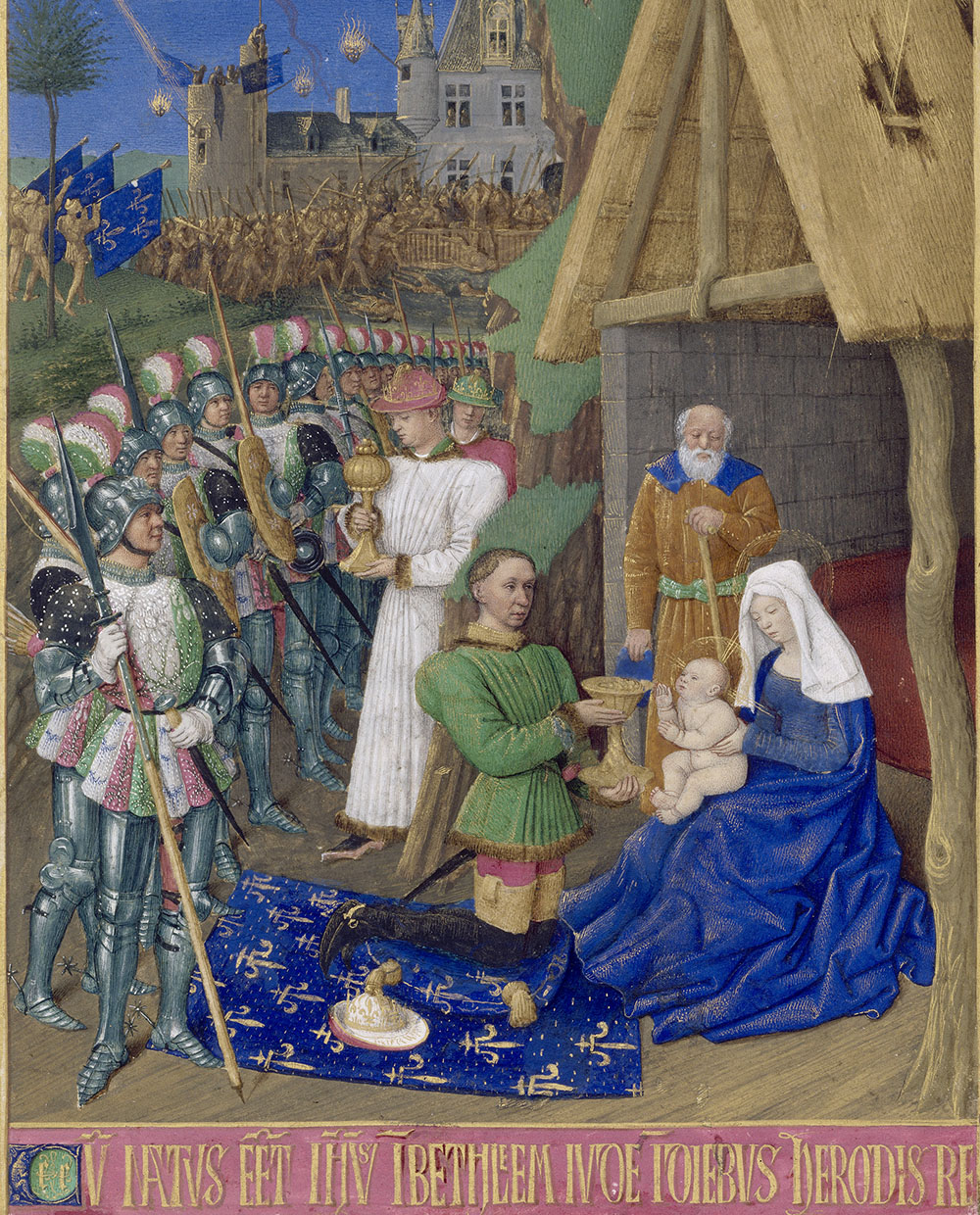
Charles VII depicted by Jean Fouquet as one of the Three Magi

== Legacy ==
Although Charles VII's legacy is far overshadowed by the deeds and eventual martyrdom of Joan of Arc and his early reign was at times marked by indecisiveness and inaction, he was responsible for successes unprecedented in the history of the Kingdom of France. He succeeded in what four generations of his predecessors (namely his father Charles VI, his grandfather Charles V, his great-grandfather John II and great-great grandfather Philip VI) failed to do – the expulsion of the English and the conclusion of the Hundred Years' War.

Charles V had created the first standing army in western Europe since Roman times, but the force had been disbanded in the tumultuous regency period after his death in 1380. Charles VII successfully reestablished a standing army which would survive until eventually replaced with the gendarmerie system in the 17th century.

Charles VII secured himself against papal power by the Pragmatic Sanction of Bourges. He also established the University of Poitiers in 1432, and his policies brought some economic prosperity to his subjects.

== Family ==
=== Children ===
Charles married his second cousin Marie of Anjou on 18 December 1422. They were both great-grandchildren of King John II of France and his first wife Bonne of Bohemia through the male line. They had fourteen children:

Name	Birth	Death	Notes
Louis	3 July 1423	30 August 1483	King of France. Married firstly Margaret of Scotland, no issue. Married secondly Charlotte of Savoy, had issue.
John	19 September 1426		Lived for a few hours.
Radegonde	1425 or August 1428	February 1445 (Note: Watanabe states Radegonde died at age 19.)	Betrothed to Sigismund, Archduke of Austria, on 22 July 1430.
Catherine	1428	13 September 1446	Married Charles the Bold, no issue.
James	1432	2 March 1437	Died aged five.
Yolande	23 September 1434	23/29 August 1478	Married Amadeus IX, Duke of Savoy, had issue.
Joan	4 May 1435	4 May 1482	Married John II, Duke of Bourbon, no issue.
Philip	4 February 1436	11 June 1436	Died in infancy.
Margaret	May 1437	24 July 1438	Died aged one.
Joanna	7 September 1438	26 December 1446	Twin of Marie, died aged eight.
Marie	7 September 1438	14 February 1439	Twin of Joanna, died in infancy.
Isabella	1441		Died young.
Magdalena	1 December 1443	21 January 1495	Married Gaston of Foix, Prince of Viana, had issue.
Charles	12 December 1446	24 May 1472	Died without legitimate issue.

=== Mistresses ===
- Agnès Sorel, by whom he had three illegitimate daughters:
  - Marie, possibly born the summer of 1444.
  - Charlotte, m. Jacques de Brézé (their son, Louis de Brézé, seigneur d'Anet, in turn married Diane de Poitiers, herself ultimately a famous royal mistress).
- Antoinette de Maignelais, cousin of Agnès Sorel.

=== Ancestors ===
Ancestors of Charles VII of France

8. John II of France
4. Charles V of France
9. Bonne of Luxembourg
2. Charles VI of France
10. Peter I, Duke of Bourbon
5. Joanna of Bourbon
11. Isabella of Valois
1. Charles VII of France
12. Stephen II, Duke of Bavaria
6. Stephen III, Duke of Bavaria
13. Elisabeth of Sicily
3. Isabeau of Bavaria
14. Bernabò Visconti
7. Taddea Visconti
15. Beatrice Regina della Scala

== See also ==
- Journal d'un bourgeois de Paris

== Works cited ==
- Allmand, Christopher (2014). Henry V. Yale University Press. ISBN 978-0520082939.
- Ashdown-Hill, John (2016). The Private Life of Edward IV. Amberley Publishing. ISBN 978-1-4456-5245-0. OL 28605946M.
- Autrand, Françoise (1994). Charles V : le Sage (in French). Fayard. ISBN 978-2213027692.
- Brady, Thomas A.; Oberman, Heiko A.; Tracy, James D., eds. (1994). Handbook of European History 1400–1600: Late Middle Ages, Renaissance, and Reformation. Vol. 1. Leiden: E. J. Brill. ISBN 90-04-09760-0.
- Debris, Cyrille (2005). "Tu Felix Austria, nube" la dynastie de Habsbourg et sa politique matrimoniale à la fin du Moyen Age (XIIIe–XVIe siècles) (in French). Brepols. ISBN 978-2503516752.
- Fletcher, Stella (2013). The Longman Companion to Renaissance Europe, 1390–1530. Routledge. ISBN 978-1-1381-6532-8. OL 28855605M.
- Michelet, Jules (1893–1894). Œuvres complètes de J. Michelet (in French). Vol. 5. Paris: Ernest Flammarion.
- Monks, Peter Rolf (1990). The Brussels Horloge de Sapience: Iconography and Text of Brussels. Brill. ISBN 978-9-0040-9088-0.
- Morrison, Elizabeth; Hedeman, Anne Dawson (2010). Imagining the Past in France: History in Manuscript Painting, 1250–1500. J. Paul Getty Museum. ISBN 978-1606060292.
- Pernoud, R.; Clin, M. (1999). Joan of Arc: Her Story. Translated by Jeremy Adams. St. Martin's Griffin. ISBN 978-0-3122-2730-2. OL 9536734M.
- Schlesinger, Arthur M. (1985). Joan of Arc. Chelsea House Publishers. ISBN 978-0-8775-4556-9.
- Sizer, Michael (2007). "The Calamity of Violence: Reading the Paris Massacres of 1418". Proceedings of the Western Society for French History. 35. Michigan Publishing.
- Sumption, Jonathan (2015). The Hundred Years War, Volume IV: Cursed Kings. London: Faber & Faber. ISBN 9780571274543.
- Taylor, Larissa Juliet (2009). The Virgin Warrior: The Life and Death of Joan of Arc. Yale University Press. ISBN 978-0300114584.
- Vale, M. G. A. (1974). Charles VII. University of California Press. ISBN 978-0-5200-2787-9. OL 5070704M.
- Vale, Malcolm (1998). "France at the End of the Hundred Years War (c. 1420–1461)". In Allmand, Christopher (ed.). The New Cambridge Medieval History. Vol. VII. Cambridge University Press. pp. 392–407. ISBN 978-0-521-38296-0.
- Vaughan, Richard (2005). John the Fearless: The Growth of Burgundian Power. Boydell Press. ISBN 978-0-85115916-4.
- Vester, Matthew, ed. (2013). Sabaudian Studies: Political Culture, Dynasty, and Territory (1400–1700). Truman State University Press. ISBN 978-1612480947.
- Wagner, J. (2006). Encyclopedia of the Hundred Years War. Westport, CN: Greenwood Press. ISBN 978-0-3133-2736-0.
- Ward, A.W.; Prothero, G.W.; Leathes, Stanley, eds. (1911). The Cambridge Modern History, Volume XIII: Genealogical Tables and Lists and General Index. Cambridge at the University Press.
- Watanabe, Morimichi (2011). Christianson, Gerald; Izbicki, Thomas M. (eds.). Nicholas of Cusa: A Companion to his Life and his Times. Ashgate Publishing. ISBN 9781315598277.
- Wellman, Kathleen (2013). Queens and Mistresses of Renaissance France. Yale University Press. ISBN 978-0-3001-7885-2.
- Wylie, James Hamilton (1914). The Reign of Henry the Fifth: 1413–1415. Cambridge University Press.

Charles VII of France House of Valois Cadet branch of the Capetian dynasty Born: 22 February 1403 Died: 22 July 1461
Regnal titles
Preceded by Charles VI	King of France disputed with Henry VI of England, 1422–29; 21 October 1422 – 22 July 1461	Succeeded by Louis XI
Preceded by John of Valois	Dauphin of Viennois; 5 April 1417 – 3 July 1423	Succeeded by Louis XI
Preceded by John of Valois	Duke of Touraine; Count of Poitou; 1417 – 21 October 1422	Vacant Merged in the crown
Preceded by John of Valois	Duke of Berry; 1417 – 21 October 1422	Vacant Merged in the crown Title next held by Charles II
Preceded by John of Valois	Count of Ponthieu; 1417 – 21 October 1422	Vacant Merged in the crown Title next held by Charles II
