= Yolande of Aragon =

Duchess of Anjou (1381–1442)

- Countess of Maine, Provence and Forcalquier
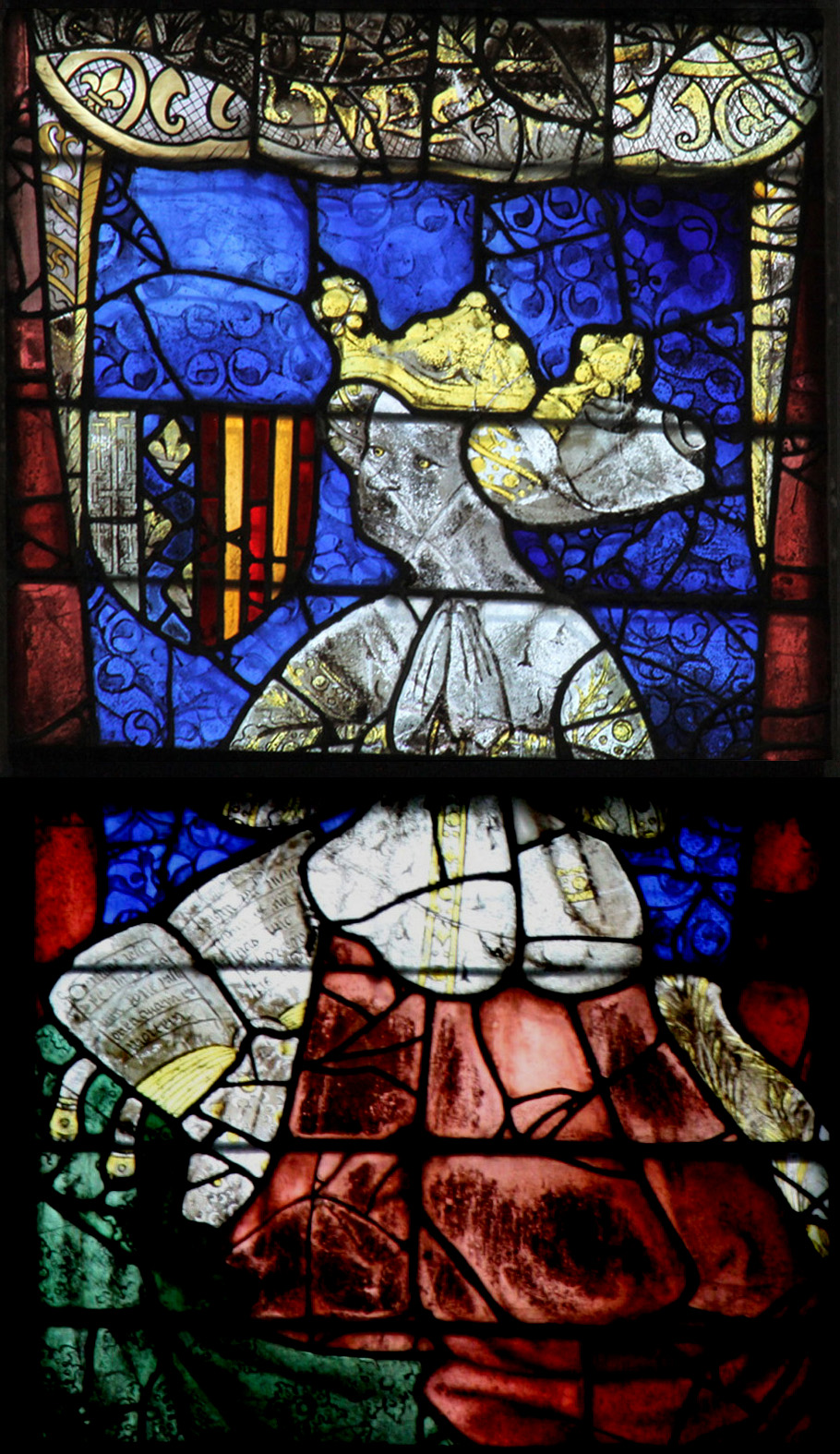
- Yolande of Aragon

Duchess consort of Anjou
- Tenure: 2 December 1400 – 29 April 1417
- Born: 11 August 1381; Zaragoza, Kingdom of Aragon
- Died: 14 November 1442 (aged 61); Saumur, France
- Burial: Cathédrale Saint-Maurice d'Angers, France
- Spouse: Louis II of Anjou (m. 1400)
- Issue: Louis III, Duke of Anjou; Marie, Queen of France; René, King of Naples; Yolande, Countess of Montfort l'Amaury; Charles, Count of Maine
- House: Barcelona
- Father: John I of Aragon
- Mother: Violant of Bar

Yolande of Aragon (11 August 1381 – 14 November 1442) was Duchess of Anjou and Countess of Provence by marriage, who acted as regent of Provence during the minority of her son. She was also known as Yolanda de Aragón and Violant d'Aragó. Tradition holds that she commissioned the famous Rohan Hours.

== Family and marriage ==
Yolande was born in Zaragoza, Aragon, on 11 August 1381, the eldest daughter of King John I of Aragon by his second wife, Yolande of Bar, the granddaughter of King John II of France. She had three brothers and two sisters, as well as five older half-siblings from her father's first marriage to Martha of Armagnac. Yolande later played an important role in the politics of England, France, and Aragon during the first half of the 15th century.

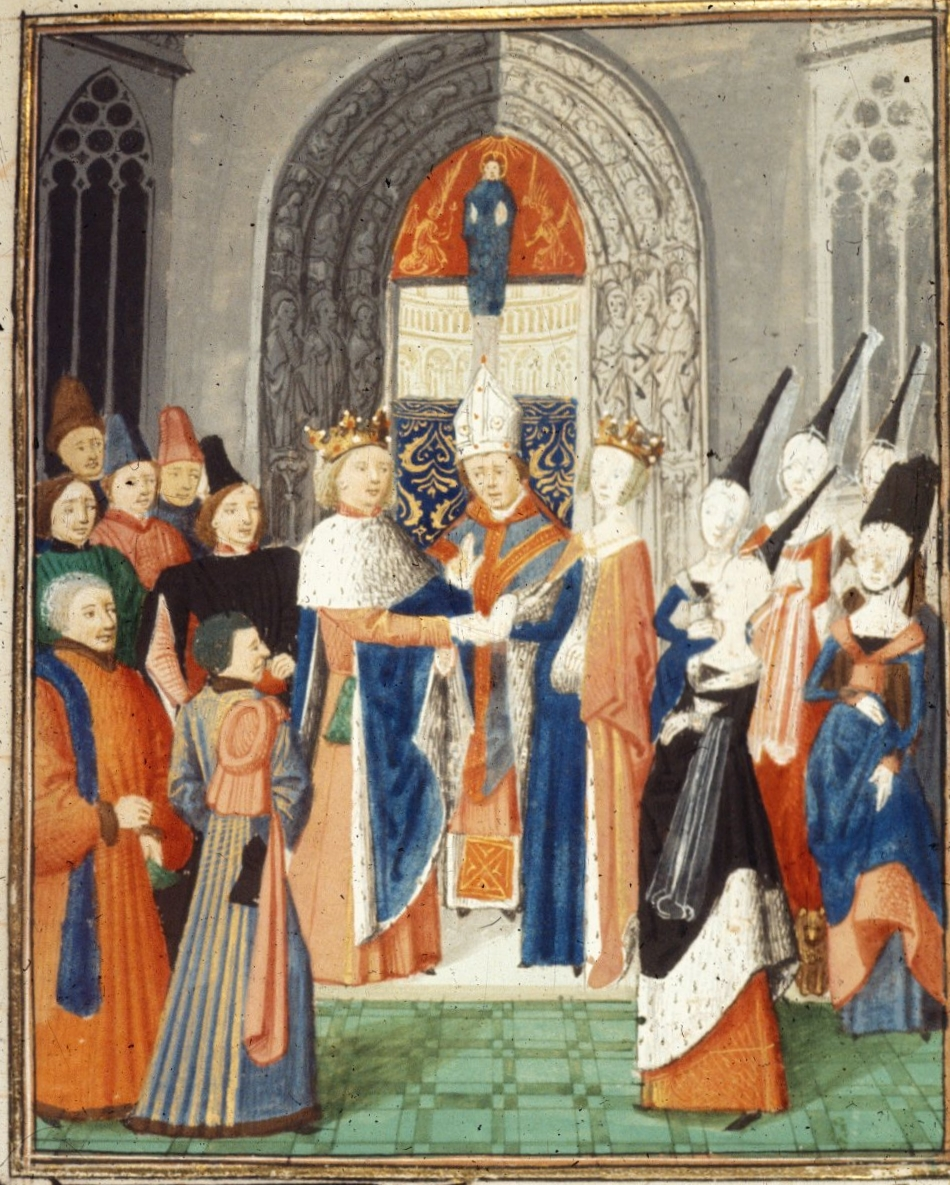
The marriage of Yolande and Louis II of Anjou, from Froissart's Chronicles

In 1387, Yolande's parents received a marriage proposal for the newly crowned King of Naples, Louis II, through his mother, Marie of Blois. When she was eleven, Yolande signed a document to disavow any promises made by ambassadors about her marrying Louis II. In 1395, Richard II of England also opened negotiations for Yolande's hand. To prevent this marriage, Charles VI of France offered his own daughter Isabella to King Richard. After the death of Yolande's father, Marie of Blois convinced Yolande's uncle Martin I of Aragon to have Yolande wed Louis II. Yolande signed a protest, but was forced to retract it later. The couple married in Arles on December 2, 1400. Despite Yolande's earlier objections and the later illnesses of her husband, the marriage was a success.

== Claim to the Aragonese throne ==
As the surviving daughter of King John I of Aragon, she claimed the throne of Aragon after the deaths of her elder sister Joanna, Countess of Foix, and her uncle, King Martin I. However, unclear though they were, the laws of succession for Aragon and Barcelona at that time were understood to favour all male relatives over the females (which is how Yolande's uncle Martin of Aragon came to inherit the throne of Aragon). Martin died without surviving issue in 1410, and after two years without a king, the Estates of Aragon elected Ferdinand, the second son of Eleanor of Aragon and John I of Castile, as the next King of Aragon.

The Anjou candidate for the throne of Aragon was Yolande's eldest son Louis III of Anjou, Duke of Calabria, whose claim was forfeited in the Pact of Caspe. Yolande and her sons regarded themselves as the heirs with the stronger claim and began to use the title of Kings of Aragon. As a result of this additional inheritance, Yolande was called the "Queen of Four Kingdoms" - the four apparently Sicily, Jerusalem, Cyprus and Aragon. Another interpretation specifies Naples separate from Sicily, plus Jerusalem and Aragon. The number could be raised to seven if the two component kingdoms of the Crown of Aragon (Majorca and Valencia) and Sardinia were included. However, the reality was that Yolande and her family controlled territories in these kingdoms only at short intervals, if ever. Their true realm was the Anjou fiefdoms across France: they held uncontestably the provinces of Provence and Anjou, and also at times Bar, Maine, Touraine and Valois. Yolande's son René I of Anjou became ruler of Lorraine through his marriage to Isabella, Duchess of Lorraine.

== France and the House of Anjou ==
In the emerging second phase of the Hundred Years' War, Yolande chose to support the French (in particular the Armagnac party) against the English and the Burgundians. After John the Fearless, Duke of Burgundy, instigated a mob attack on the Dauphin of France in 1413, she and her husband repudiated the engagement of their son Louis to John's daughter Catherine of Burgundy, which placed them decisively in the Armagnac camp. In the same year, Yolande met with Queen Isabeau of France to finalize a marriage contract between her daughter Marie and Isabeau's third surviving son Charles.

After his two older brothers died, she supported the claim of the Dauphin Charles who, relying upon Yolande's resources and help, succeeded in becoming crowned Charles VII of France. Yolande arranged the marriage of Charles to her daughter Marie of Anjou, thus becoming Charles' mother-in-law. This led to Yolande's personal involvement in the struggle for the survival of the House of Valois in France.

Yolande's marriage to Louis II of Anjou, at Arles in December 1400, was arranged as a part of long-standing efforts to resolve contested claims upon the kingdom of Sicily and Naples between the houses of Anjou and Aragon. Louis spent much of his life fighting in Italy for his claim to the Kingdom of Naples. In France, Yolande was the Duchess of Anjou and the Countess of Provence. She preferred to hold court in Angers and Saumur. She had six children, and through her second son René was the grandmother of Margaret of Anjou, the wife of King Henry VI of England.

With the victory of the English over the French at the Battle of Agincourt in 1415, the Duchy of Anjou was threatened. The French king, Charles VI, was mentally ill and his realm was in a state of civil war between the Burgundians and the Orleanists (Armagnacs). The situation was made worse by an alliance between the Duke of Burgundy, John the Fearless, the English, and the French queen, Isabeau of Bavaria, who submitted to the Duke of Burgundy's scheme to deny the crown of France to the children of Charles VI. Fearing the abusive power building behind the Duke of Burgundy, Louis II had Yolande move with her children and future son-in-law, Charles, to Provence in southern France.

== The Dauphin ==
In the years 1415 and 1417, the two oldest surviving sons of Charles VI of France died in quick succession: first Louis, then Jean. Both brothers had been in the care of the Duke of Burgundy. Yolande was the protectress of her son-in-law, Charles, who became the new Dauphin. She refused Queen Isabeau's orders to return Charles to the French Court; according to Jehan de Bourdigné, when asked she replied, "We have not nurtured and cherished this one for you to make him die like his brothers or to go mad like his father, or to become English like you. I keep him for my own. Come and take him away, if you dare."

On 29 April 1417, Louis II of Anjou died of illness, leaving Yolande, at age 33, in control of the House of Anjou. She acted as regent for her son because of his youth. She also had the fate of the French royal house of Valois in her hands. Her young son-in-law, the Dauphin Charles, was exceptionally vulnerable to the designs of the English King, Henry V, and to his older cousin, John the Fearless, the Duke of Burgundy. Charles' nearest older relatives, the Dukes of Orléans and of Bourbon, had been made prisoners at the Battle of Agincourt and were held captive by the English. With his mother, Queen Isabeau, and the Duke of Burgundy allied with the English, Charles had no resources to support him other than those of the House of Anjou and the smaller House of Armagnac.

Following the assassination of John the Fearless at Montereau in 1419, his son Philip the Good succeeded him as Duke of Burgundy. With Henry V of England, Philip forced the Treaty of Troyes (21 May 1420) on the mentally-ill King Charles VI. The treaty designated Henry as "Regent of France" and heir to the French throne. Following this, the Dauphin Charles was declared disinherited in 1421. When both Henry V of England and Charles VI of France died in 1422 (on 31 August and 21 October, respectively), the Dauphin Charles, at age 19, legitimately became Charles VII of France. Charles' title was challenged by the English and their Burgundian allies, who supported the candidacy of Henry VI of England, the infant son of Henry V and Catherine of Valois, Charles' own sister, as king of France. This set the stage for the last phase of the Hundred Years' War: the "War of Charles VII".

In this struggle, Yolande played a prominent role in surrounding the young Valois king with advisers and servants associated with the House of Anjou. She manoeuvred John VI, Duke of Brittany, into breaking an alliance with the English, and was responsible for a soldier from the Breton ducal family, Arthur de Richemont, becoming Constable of France in 1425. Using the Constable de Richemont, Yolande was behind the forceful removal of several of Charles VII's advisers. Thus, La Trémoille was attacked and forced from the court in 1433.

The contemporary chronicler Jean Juvenal des Ursins (1433–44), Bishop of Beauvais, described Yolande as "the prettiest woman in the kingdom." Bourdigné, chronicler of the house of Anjou, says of her: "She who was said to be the wisest and most beautiful princess in Christendom." Later, King Louis XI of France recalled that his grandmother had "a man's heart in a woman's body." A twentieth-century French author, Jehanne d'Orliac, wrote one of the few works specifically on Yolande, and noted that the duchess remains unappreciated for her genius and influence in the reign of Charles VII. "She is mentioned in passing because she is the pivot of all important events for forty-two years in France", while "Joan [of Arc] was in the public eye only eleven months."

Yolande retired to Angers and then to Saumur. She continued to play a role in politics. When the bishopric in Angers fell vacant, she threatened Charles VII's candidate with beheading if he showed up in the city. The king backed down and the post went to her secretary. At least from 1439 onwards, her granddaughter Margaret of Anjou came to live with her. Yolande taught her not only etiquette and literature, but also how to check account books. Her last act before her death was to prepare Margaret for a possible marriage with Frederick III, Holy Roman Emperor. She received his ambassadors in Samur and presented her granddaughter to them. She died at the town house of the Seigneur de Tucé in Saumur on 14 November 1442.

== Marriage and issue ==
She was betrothed in 1390 to Louis, the heir of Anjou (who had one year earlier succeeded in conquering Naples and become King Louis II of Naples), and married him on 2 December 1400 at Montpellier. Their children were:

1. Louis III of Anjou (25 September 1403 – 12 November 1434), Duke of Anjou, Titular King of Naples. He was adopted by Queen Joanna II of Naples. Married Margaret of Savoy. Died childless;
2. Marie of Anjou (14 October 1404 – 29 November 1463). Married in 1422 King Charles VII of France. Had issue including King Louis XI of France;
3. René I of Naples (16 January 1409 – 10 July 1480), Duke of Anjou and Bar, Duke Consort of Lorraine, Titular King of Sicily and Naples. Married Duchess Isabella of Lorraine. They were the parents of Margaret of Anjou, Queen-Consort of England.
4. Yolande of Anjou (13 August 1412 – 17 July 1440). Married in 1431 Francis, Count of Montfort l'Amaury, who succeeded his father in 1442 as Duke of Brittany.
5. Charles of Anjou (14 October 1414 – 10 April 1472), Count of Maine (who never was Duke of Anjou, but his namesake son was). Married firstly Cobella Ruffo and secondly Isabelle de St.Pol, Countess of Guise. Had issue by both marriages.

== Fictional portrayals ==
- Queen Yolande appeared as a character in Jean Anouilh's acclaimed play about Joan of Arc The Lark, the role being created by Denise Perret.
- Queen Yolande appeared in the TV series Catherine, in which she was played by Geneviève Casile, the grand dame of the French theatre.
- In the 1999 film The Messenger: The Story of Joan of Arc, Queen Yolande is played by actress Faye Dunaway.
- A historical novel about Yolande, The Queen of Four Kingdoms, was written by Princess Michael of Kent and published by Beaufort Books in 2014.
- Queen Yolande appears as an important side character in Milja Kaunisto's book trilogy (Synnintekijä 2013, Kalmantanssi 2014 and Piispansormus 2015) about Olaus Magnus's life.

== Sources ==
- Zita Rohr, "Lifting the Tapestry: The Designs of Yolande of Aragon (1381–1442)", in Anthony McElligott, Liam Chambers, Ciara Breathnach, Catherine Lawless (dir.), Power in History : From Medieval Ireland to the Post-Modern World, Dublin / Portland, Oregon, Irish Academic Press, coll. "Historical studies" (n° 27), 2011, XVI-314 p. (ISBN 9780716531081), pp. 145–166.
- Rohr, Zita Eva (2016). Yolande of Aragon (1381-1442). Family and Power: The Reverse of the Tapestry. Palgrave Macmillan. ISBN 9781137499127.
- (in French) Philippe Contamine, "Yolande d'Aragon et Jeanne d'Arc : l'improbable rencontre de deux parcours politiques", in Éric Bousmar, Jonathan Dumont, Alain Marchandisse et Bertrand Schnerb (dir.), Femmes de pouvoir, femmes politiques durant les derniers siècles du Moyen Âge et au cours de la première Renaissance, Bruxelles, De Boeck, coll. "Bibliothèque du Moyen Âge", 2012, 656 p. (ISBN 978-2-8041-6553-6), pp. 11–30.
