= Catherine of France, Countess of Charolais =

Countess consort of Charolais from 1440 to 1446

Catherine of France
- Countess consort of Charolais
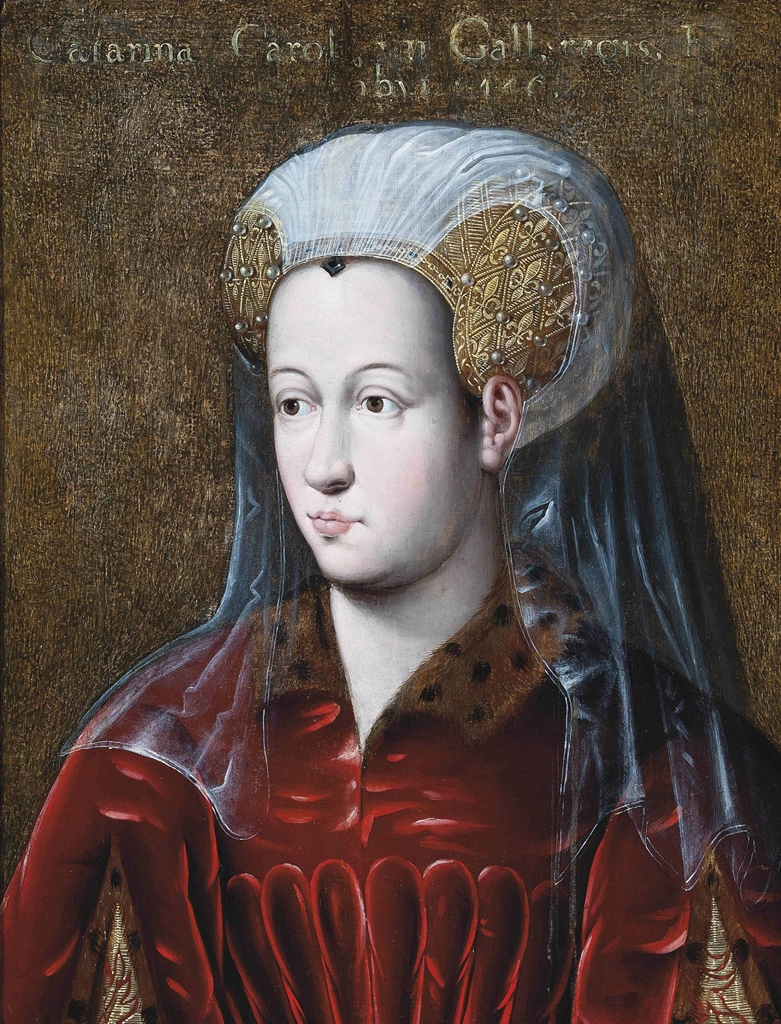
- Born: 1428
- Died: 13 July 1446 (aged 17–18)
- Spouse: Charles I, Duke of Burgundy (m. 1440)
- House: Valois
- Father: Charles VII of France
- Mother: Marie of Anjou

Catherine of France (1428 – 13 July 1446) was a French princess and a countess of Charolais, the first wife of Charles the Bold, dying before he came to be Duke of Burgundy; when she was his wife, he was Count of Charolais. Betrothed to Charles per the terms of the Treaty of Arras, she was married in 1440 when she was 12 and her husband 7. She fell ill and died in 1446.

== Life ==
Born in 1428, Catherine was fourth child and second daughter of Charles VII of France and Marie of Anjou. She was betrothed to Charles, Count of Charolais, the Burgundian heir, in accordance with the Treaty of Arras between France and Burgundy from 1435. In 1438, Charles visited the French court with an embassy and formally proposed to Catherine. On 11 June 1439, the couple was officially betrothed at St. Omer, and on May 19, 1440, the wedding was conducted at Blois. Reportedly, Catherine and Charles had a friendly relationship, but due to her youth, Catherine did not live with Charles but was handed over to the care of her spouse's mother Isabella of Portugal, Duchess of Burgundy, with whom she apparently got along very well, being treated like a substitute daughter.

Catherine was described as intelligent, kind and charming and was well liked in Burgundy, but the frequent traveling she was expected to do in parallel to adjusting to the formal court etiquette, which was required at the Burgundian court, described as one of the most elaborate in Europe and constantly moving about between the cities of the Low Countries in a cold climate, was reportedly exhausting for Catherine's delicate health. She fell ill with violent coughing in 1446 and died with what was likely tuberculosis. She and Charles had no children.

== Sources ==
- Ashdown-Hill, John (2016). The Private Life of Edward IV. Amberley Publishing.
- Damen, Mario; Brown-Grant, Rosalind, eds. (2022). A Chivalric Life: The Book of the Deeds of Messire Jacques de Lalaing. The Boydell Press.

Catherine of France, Countess of Charolais House of Valois Cadet branch of the Capetian dynasty Born: 1428 Died: 13 July 1446
Royal titles
Preceded by Isabel of Portugal	Countess consort of Charolais; 19 May 1440 – 13 July 1446	Succeeded by Isabella of Bourbon
