= Anne D. Hedeman =

American bibliographer and medievalist

- Born: 1952 or 1953 (age 73–74); Paterson, New Jersey, U.S.
- Occupations: Bibliographer; medievalist
- Spouse: John Hedeman (m. 1974)
- Children: 1
- Awards: Guggenheim Fellowship (2011)

Academic background
- Education: Princeton University; Johns Hopkins University
- Thesis: The Illustrations of the "Grandes Chroniques de France" from 1274 to 1422 (1984)

Academic work
- Discipline: Medieval studies
- Sub-discipline: Medieval manuscripts
- Institutions: University of Illinois Urbana-Champaign; University of Kansas

Anne Dawson Hedeman (born 1952/1953) is an American bibliographer and medievalist. She is a 2010 Fellow of the Medieval Academy of America and a 2011 Guggenheim Fellow, and she has edited and authored several books on medieval art and manuscripts, including The Royal Image: Illustrations of the Grandes Chroniques de France, 1274-1422 (1991) and Of Counselors and Kings: The Three Versions of Pierre Salmon's "Dialogues" (2001). She has worked as a professor at the University of Illinois Urbana-Champaign and the University of Kansas.

== Biography ==
She was born in 1952 or 1953 in Paterson, New Jersey. She attended Princeton University, where she obtained her BA in History of Art in 1974, and Johns Hopkins University, where she obtained an MA in 1977 and a PhD in 1984. Her doctoral dissertation The Illustrations of the "Grandes Chroniques de France" from 1274 to 1422 was advised by Sandra Hindman.

She originally worked at the University of Illinois Urbana-Champaign as a professor. She later moved to the University of Kansas to become Judith Harris Murphy Distinguished Professor. She was a 2003 J. Paul Getty Museum Scholar-in-Residence.

She is author of The Royal Image: Illustrations of the Grandes Chroniques de France, 1274-1422 (1991) and Of Counselors and Kings: The Three Versions of Pierre Salmon's "Dialogues" (2001). (Note: Reviews of this book:) (Note: Reviews of this book:) In 2010, she was appointed a Fellow of the Medieval Academy of America. In 2011, she was awarded a Guggenheim Fellowship. She co-edited Textual and Visual Representations of Power and Justice in Medieval France (2015), Beyond Words: Illuminated Manuscripts in Boston Collections (2016), and Inscribing Knowledge in the Medieval Book: The Power of Paratexts (2020). In 2022, she published Visual Translation: Illuminated Manuscripts and the First French Humanists.

During her first week in Princeton, she met John Hedeman while visiting a performance at the Princeton Triangle Club, and they married in 1974. John has worked in several administrative roles in universities, namely assistant dean at the Gies College of Business and director of student international experiences at the University of Kansas School of Business. The couple have a daughter.

== Works ==
- The Royal Image: Illustrations of the Grandes Chroniques de France, 1274-1422 (1991)
- Of Counselors and Kings: The Three Versions of Pierre Salmon's "Dialogues" (2001)
- Translating the Past: Laurent de Premierfait and Boccaccio's "De casibus." (2008)
- (ed. with Rosalind Brown-Grant and Bernard Ribémont) Textual and Visual Representations of Power and Justice in Medieval France: Manuscripts and Early Printed Books (2015)
- (ed. with Rosalind Brown-Grant, Patrizia Carmassi, and Gisela Drossbach) Inscribing Knowledge in the Medieval Book: The Power of Paratexts (2020)
- Visual Translation: Illuminated Manuscripts and the First French Humanists (2022)
