= David de Rambures =

Grand Master of Crossbowmen
- Reign: 1411-1415
- Born: c. 1364
- Died: 25 October 1415; Azincourt, France
- Noble family: Château de Rambures
- Spouses: Catherine d'Auxy, Dame de Dompiere and Escouy
- Issue: André de Rambures; Jean de Rambures (d. Agincourt); Hugues de Rambures (d. Agincourt); Philippe de Rambures (d. Agincourt)
- Father: Andrieux de Rambures
- Mother: Jeanne de Bregny

David de Rambures (c. 1364 – 25 October, 1415, at Azincourt) was a French knight, member of the king's council and Grand Master of Crossbowmen. He died at the Battle of Agincourt along with his three youngest sons: Jean, Hugues and Philippe.

== Life and marriage ==
David de Rambures was the son of André (nicknamed Andrieux) de Rambures (d. 1405), knight, lord of Rambures, captain of Boulogne and Gravelines, governor of the West-West Flanders province, chamberlain of King Charles VI and Jeanne de Brégny. He married Catherine d'Auxy, Dame de Dompiere and Escouy, daughter of Enguerrand d'Auxy (? - 1374) and Isabelle de Goulons. They had four sons.

In 1412 he started the construction of the current Château de Rambures, which was interrupted at his death.

== Military career ==
He was placed, thanks to his father, very early in the Hotel of the king and began his military career as a squire in the company of his father in 1387. He served in Germany in 1388 and fought on many battlefields at the beginning of the 15th century, which led him to the highest offices. He served in Picardy in 1404, under the Count of Saint-Pol, with four knights and twenty squires. He was taken prisoner at Mercq near Calais with Jean V de Hangest. His father Andreux and brother Jean died in this battle. He served in Guyenne in 1408 and became captain of the castle of Airaines, the same year. Then, in 1410, he set out for Genoa to strengthen Marshal Boucicaut with Raoul de Gaucourt. He served in Orléans with James II of Bourbon-La Marche in 1411.

He became Grand Master of the French Crossbowmen in 1411 with a salary of £2,000 a year and a bonus of £600.

He defended Ponthieu and Artois, captain of Boulogne (1415), he commanded the battle of Dieppe against the English.

He fought at the Battle of Agincourt in 1415 and was killed along with his three sons

== Political career ==
Familiar of the Court of Burgundy, he attended the marriage of Marguerite of Burgundy with Guillaume de Hainaut in 1385, that of John the Fearless with Margaret of Bavaria and that of Antoine of Burgundy with Jeanne of Luxembourg in Arras, in 1402. He was chamberlain of the Duke of Burgundy Philip the Bold in 1401-1402.

He was a member of the king's council in 1402 and in 1410 became chamberlain to the Duke of Guyenne. After the Treaty of Bicetre of December 10, 1410, he was one of the twelve knights who were members of the Council of Regency, in charge of the government during the madness of King Charles VI. His attachment to the Duke of Burgundy caused his dismissal in 1413.

He then served the Duke of Burgundy, John the Fearless, in 1413, and then the Dauphin, for whom he became the commissioner for the execution of the Treaty of Arras on September 4, 1414.

== Literature ==
- William Shakespeare, in his play Henry V, called him Lord Rambures, the master of the French crossbows.
