= Château de Rambures =

Castle in Somme, France

Coordinates: 49°56′39″N 1°42′27″E

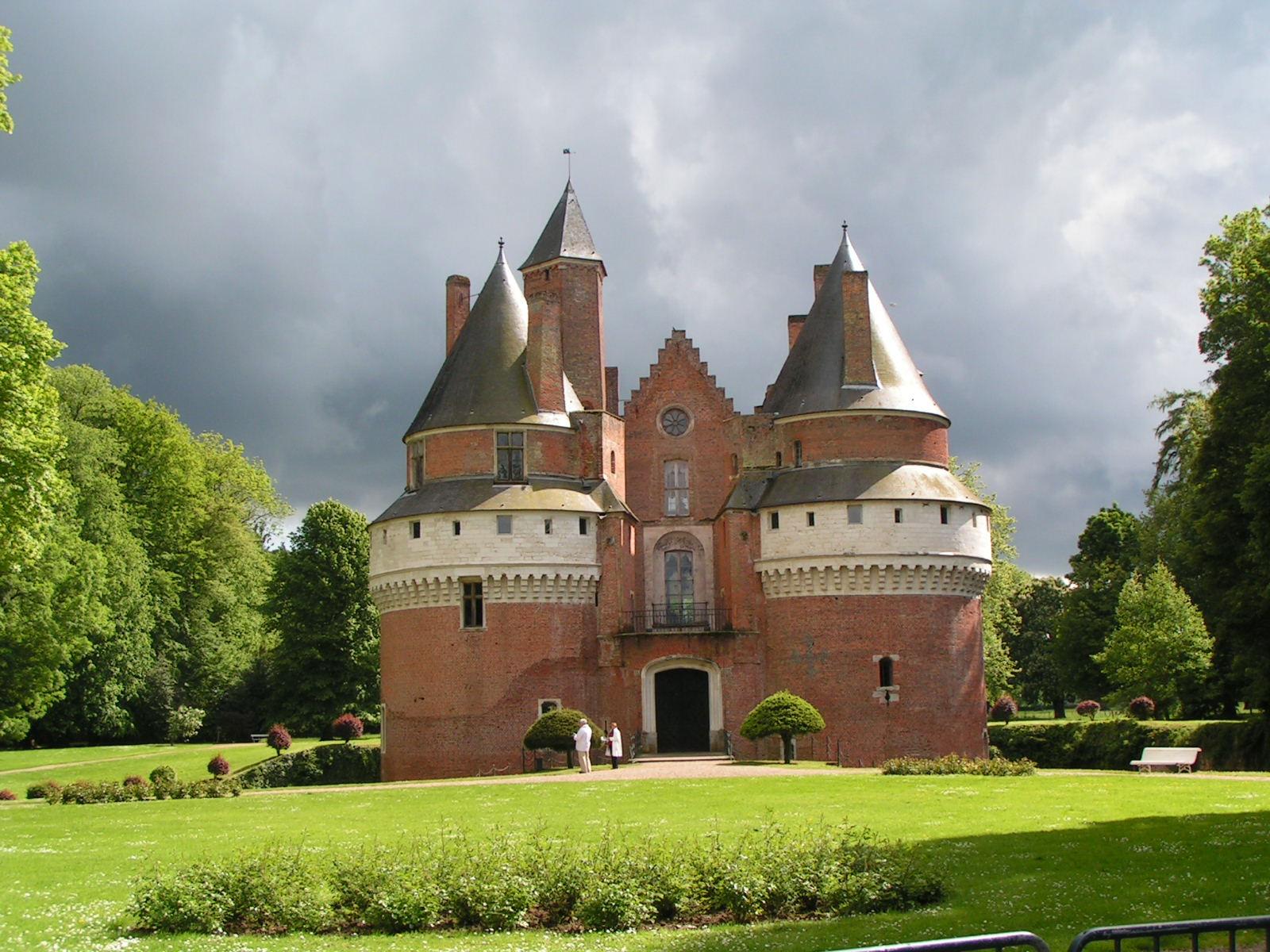
Château de Rambures

Le Château de Rambures is a castle situated in the commune of Rambures in the Somme département of France.

It was constructed in the Middle Ages in the style of a military fortress of the 15th century and was one of the first castles in Europe to be constructed almost exclusively in bricks. The castle is set in a park, the Parc et Roseraie du Château de Rambures containing a rose garden and ancient trees.

The castle contains very interesting Picardy furniture from the 15th, 16th and 17th centuries.

It has been classified as a monument historique by the French Ministry of Culture since 1927.

== Description ==
The castle is laid out as a square and is composed of eight towers and half-towers. The towers form the corners of the square and are linked by the half-towers. There is a single room on each level of the towers between the basement and the second floor. Communication between the underground level and the second floor is provided by four spiral staircases placed in the internal angles of the corner towers. The castle was constructed within a dry moat and is built largely of brick, a defensive measure against the then new artillery, with some limestone. Located near the frontier between the French and English territories, construction began during the Hundred Years' War but it was not complete until after the end of the war.

== History ==
The estate has been passed down by inheritance and through marriage since the 11th century. The Rambures name first appeared in 1058. Famous Rambures include David (1364–1415), Lord Rambures from Shakespeare's Henry V, and Charles (1572–1633), the so-called "Brave Rambures" who saved the life of Henry IV of France in 1590.

Successive owners are:

Seigneurs de Rambures

- Asson (11th century).
- David ( - 1103), son of the preceding.
- Jean (12th century), son of the preceding; he married Hawise de Bournonville.
- Robinet, son of the preceding; he married Yde de Melun.
- Jean, son of the preceding; he married Adeline.
- Hugues ( - after 1356), son of the preceding; he married Jeanne de Drucat
- Jean ( - 1405), son of the preceding, governor of Arras; his second wife was Jeanne de Bernuy; he died in the attack on the Château de Mercq.
- Adrien ( - 1405), son of the preceding, captain of Boulogne and Gravelines, Governor of West Flanders; he married Jeanne de Bernuy; he died with his father at the Château de Mercq.
- David (1364–1415), son of the preceding, Master of Crossbowmen of France in 1411; he married Catherine d'Auxy; he began the construction of the present castle in 1412, but building was interrupted by his death at the Battle of Agincourt.
- André (circa 1395 - after 1449), son of the preceding; he married Péronne de Créquy; in 1429, he commanded a company at Orléans with Joan of Arc; he was killed at the siege of Pont-Audemer.
- Jacques (circa 1428 - after 1488), son of the preceding; he married Marie Antoinette de Berghes Saint-Winoch; he completed the castle's construction in 1470.
- André ( - after 1512), son of the preceding, councillor and chamberlain to the king, sénéchal and Governor of Ponthieu in 1492, grand-master of the waters and forests of Picardy; he married Jeanne de Halluin.
- Jean (1500 - after 1558), son of the preceding; in 1538, he married Claude de Bourbon-Vendôme, dame de Ligny.
- Jean (1543–1591), son of the preceding; in 1538, he married, for the second time, Françoise d'Anjou, countess of Dammartin.
- Charles (1572–1633), son of the preceding; in 1589, he won victory at the Battle of Arques; in 1590, he saved the life of Henry IV bestowed honours on him and named him « le brave Rambures »; in 1620, he married Renée de Boulainvilliers, dame de Courtenay.

Marquis de Rambures direct line

- Charles René (circa 1622 - 1671), comte de Courtenay, son of the preceding; in 1656, he married Marie de Bautru.
- Louis Alexandre (1658–1676), son of the preceding; infantry colonel, died age 18 without heir.
- Charlotte de Rambures, aunt of the preceding and sister of Charles René, inheritor of the estate; she married in 1645 François de La Roche, marquis de Fontenilles.

Marquis de Rambures by alliance - family of La Roche Fontenilles

- François ( - 1728), son of the preceding; in 1683, he married Marie Thérèse de Mesmes.
- Louis Antoine (1696–1755), son of the preceding, marshal of the Camps and Armies of the King; in 1735], he married Élisabeth Marguerite de Saint-Georges de Vérac.
- Antoine César (1746–1764), son of the preceding, infantry officer.
- Pierre Paul Louis (1755–1833), cousin of the preceding and great grandson of François and Charlotte, marshal in 1791; he married Marie Claude Alexandrine Morard d'Arces; he emigrated in 1791.
- Adélaïde Honoré César (1786–1868), son of the preceding; in 1833, he married Charlotte Antoinette Thérèse Le Clerc de Juigné.
- Léon Alexandre (1835–1920), son of the preceding; in 1859, he married Marie-Thérèse de Chevigné.
- Charles Antoine (1839–1930), brother of the preceding; in 1864, he married Louise Amour Marie de Bouillé; these were the last to have the titles of marquis and marquise de Rambures.

Contemporary epoch

- Guy, comte de Blanchard ( - 1969), grand-nephew of the preceding; he inherited the estate in 1930.
- Charles Henri, comte de Blanchard, adopted son of the preceding; he married Hélène.

== Visits ==
The castle and its park are open to the public from 1 March to mid-November, and during the rest of the year by appointment.

== See also ==
- List of castles in France

== Bibliography ==
- Christine Debrie Nicolas Blasset, architecte et sculpteur ordinaire du roi, 1600-1659, p. 275 on) (1985 - Nouvelles Éditions Latines)
- André Borel d'Hauterive Annuaire de la noblesse de France et des maisons souveraines de l'Europe, (1869)
- M. le Chevalier de Courcelles Dictionnaire historique et biographique des généraux français - Volume 9, (Paris, 1823)
