= Agincourt, Meurthe-et-Moselle =

Agincourt
- Commune
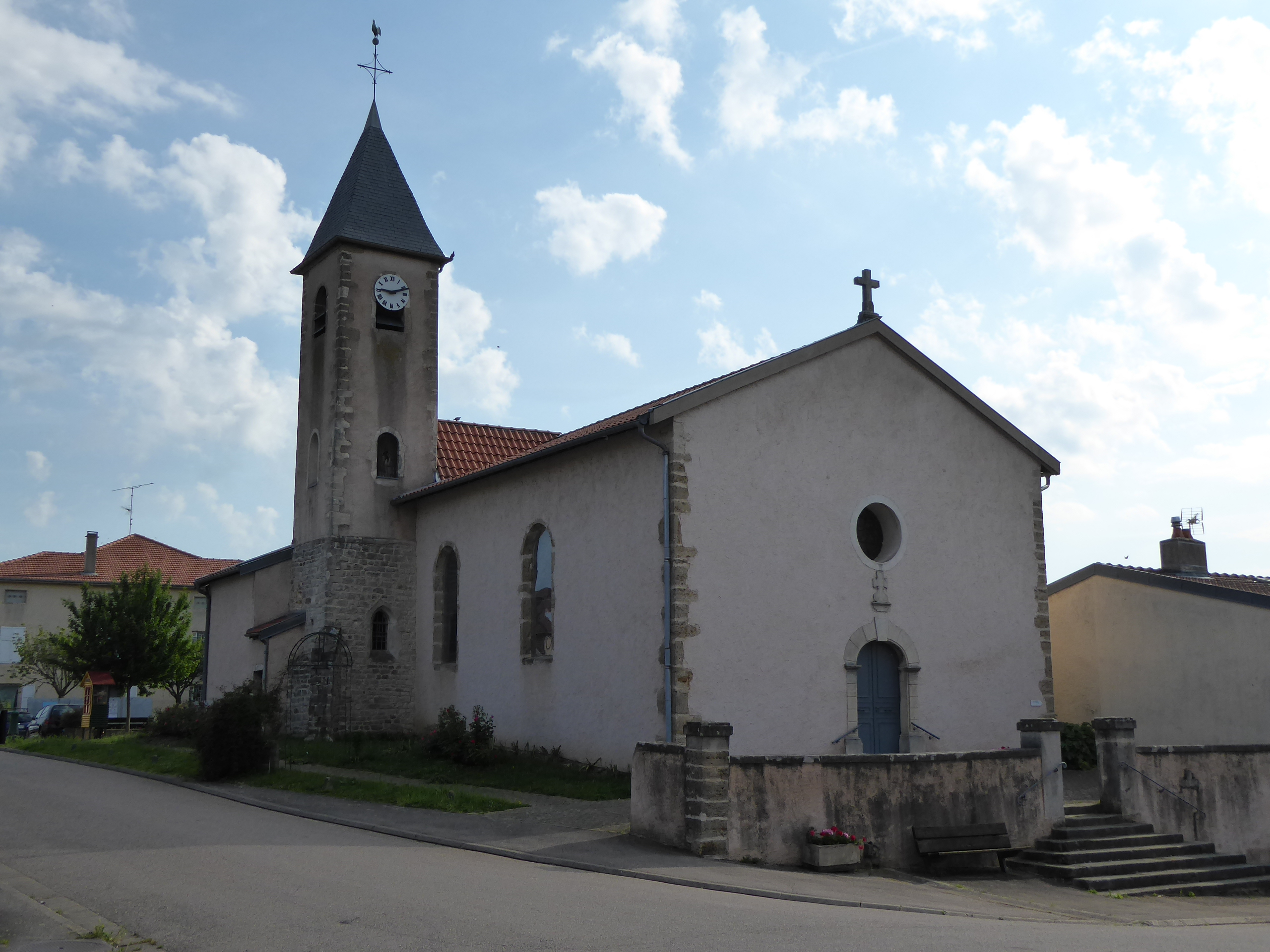
- The church in Agincourt

- Coat of arms
- Location of Agincourt
- Location within France Location within Grand Est
- Coordinates: 48°44′01″N 6°14′17″E
- Country: France
- Region: Grand Est
- Department: Meurthe-et-Moselle
- Arrondissement: Nancy
- Canton: Grand Couronné
- Intercommunality: Seille et Grand Couronné

Government
  - Mayor (2020–2026): Denis Lapointe
- Area^{1}: 4.17 km^{2} (1.61 sq mi)
- Elevation: 225 m (738 ft)
- Highest elevation: 322 m (1,056 ft)
- Lowest elevation: 204 m (669 ft)
- Population (2023): 424
  - Density: 102/km^{2} (263/sq mi)
- Time zone: UTC+01:00 (CET)
  - Summer (DST): UTC+02:00 (CEST)
- INSEE/Postal code: 54006 /54770
- ^{1} French Land Register data, which excludes lakes, ponds, glaciers > 1 km^{2} (0.386 sq mi or 247 acres) and river estuaries.

Agincourt (French pronunciation: [aʒɛ̃kuʁ]) is a commune in the Meurthe-et-Moselle department in northeastern France.

The commune covers an area of 4.17 km^{2} (1.61 sq mi). The current mayor is Denis Lapointe.

== Population ==
Inhabitants are called Agincourtois in French.

Historical population
Year	Pop.	±% p.a.
1968	276	—
1975	310	+1.67%
1982	358	+2.08%
1990	412	+1.77%
1999	399	−0.36%
2007	410	+0.34%
2012	435	+1.19%
2017	438	+0.14%
2023	424	−0.54%
Source: INSEE

== See also ==
- Communes of the Meurthe-et-Moselle department
- Commune of Azincourt, site of the Battle of Agincourt
- The Toronto neighborhood of Agincourt, named for Azincourt but spelled "Agincourt."
