= Book of the Four Ladies =

15th-century French allegorical poem by Alain Chartier

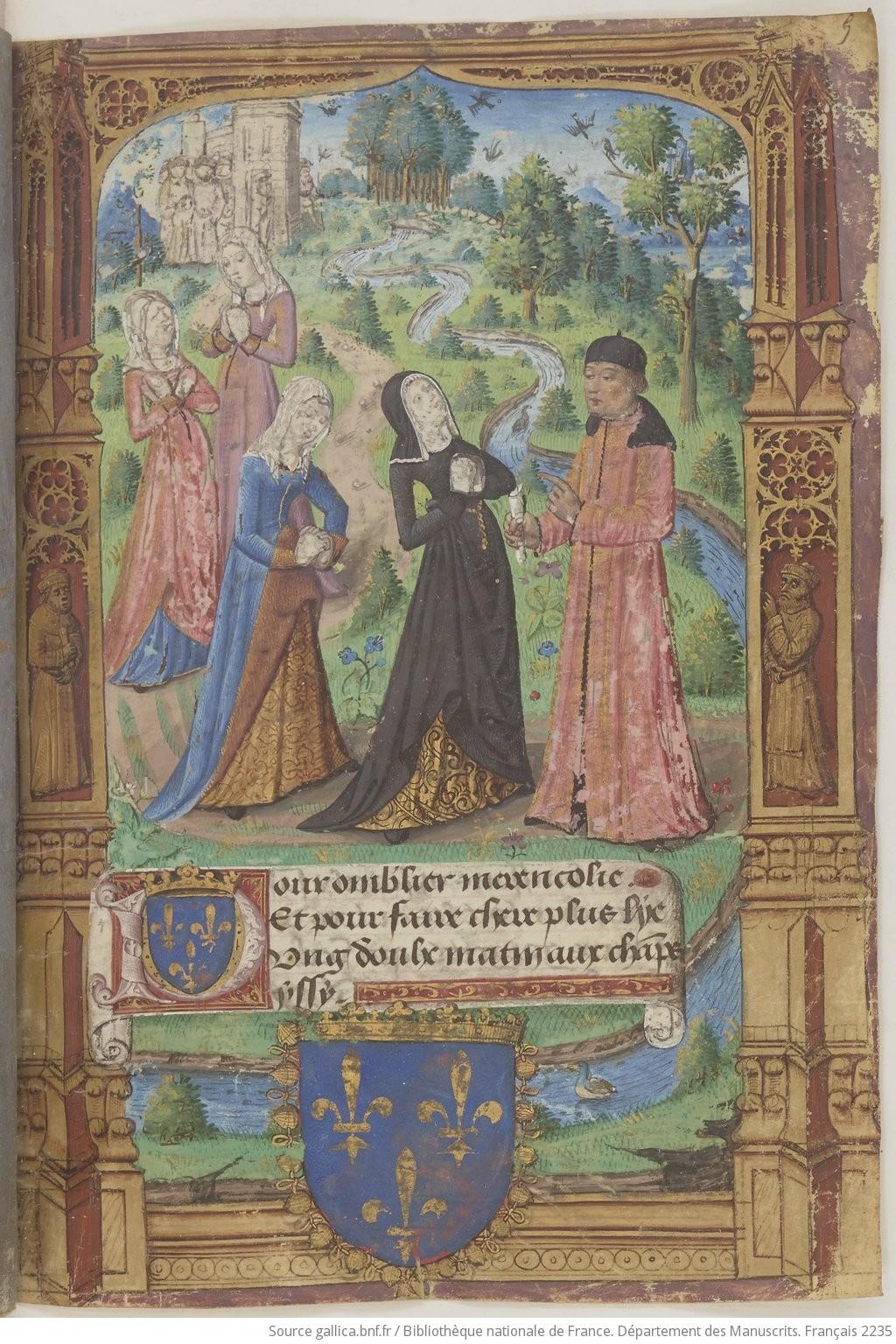
Illustration of the poem

Book of the Four Ladies (French: Le Livre des quatres dames ) is a poem written by Alain Chartier in 1416 in Middle French after the Battle of Agincourt.

The poem consists of 3,531 octosyllabic verses forming a dialogue scene. The poem starts with a description of a bucolic setting in spring. Four women discuss the fate of their lovers in the aftermath of an unnamed battle, implicitly the Battle of Agincourt. The first woman's lover was killed, the second woman's lover was taken prisoner by the English, the third woman's lover was missing and the fourth woman's lover had fled the scene of the battle. The women discuss their sadness. Their discussion is overheard by the poet-narrator, who ruminates on which woman is to be pitied the most.

Chartier would later use the same dialogue format in his poem Quadrilogue invectif.

Book of Four Ladies inspired Marguerite de Navarre's La Coche, in which the narrator meets three weeping friends in a field who successively tell her their heartaches so that she can decide which one deserves the most pity.
