= Siege of Mercq =

Siege during the Hundred Years' War

- Part of the Hundred Years' War
Date	6 May 1405
Location	Mercq, Pas-de-Calais, France 50°27′49″N 2°8′30″E
Result	English Victory; French attack army routed

Belligerents
Kingdom of France	Kingdom of England

Commanders and leaders
Waleran III, Count of Ligny; David de Rambures (POW); Andrieux de Rambures †; Jean V de Hangest (POW)	Richard Aston; Robert de Berengeville †

Strength
~800: 400-500 men-at-arms; 50 Genoese crossbowmen; 300 Flemish soldiers	~500

Casualties and losses
Heavy	Light

On 6 May of 1405, a French army under the command of Waleran III, Count of Ligny and Saint-Pol besieged the English castle at Mercq in Pas-de-Calais.

== Siege ==
The French siege proved futile as English reinforcements under Lieutenant of Calais Sir Richard Aston arrived with the Calais garrison to counterattack and lift the siege. Although surprised by the English attack the French troops manned the trenches, but the Genoese crossbowmen had no bolts and St. Pol's army suffered losses from English archers. The first to flee were the Flemings, quickly followed by the French and Genoese. Waleran III escaped with remnants of his army, but most were either killed or captured. The English captured all the French artillery, four standards, 60-80 prisoners including Jean de Hangest.

=== French Nobles Killed ===
- Andrieux de Rambures, the captain of Boulogne and Gravelines, Governor of West Flanders
- Jean de Rambures, Governor of Arras
- Morel de Saveuse
- Guy Divrigny
- Courbet de Renty
- Martel de Vaulhuom
- Lord of Faiel
- Lord of Cresecques

=== French Nobles taken Prisoner ===
- David de Rambures
- Jean V de Hangest
- Sarrazin Darby
- Captain of Boulogne
- Lord of Guiency
- Lord of Noielle-sur-Sens
- Lord of Brimeu
- Lord of Dampierre

== Sources ==
- Given-Wilson, Chris (2008). ""The Quarrel of Old Women": Henry IV, Louis of Orleans, and Anglo-French Chivalric Challenges in the Early Fifteenth Century". In Dodd, Gwilym; Biggs, Douglas (eds.). The Reign of Henry IV: Rebellion and Survival, 1403-1413. York Medieval Press.
- Purton, Peter Fraser (2009). A History of the Late Medieval Siege, 1200-1500. Boydell & Brewer.
- Sumption, Jonathan (2017). The Hundred Years War, Volume 4: Cursed Kings. Vol. 4. University of Pennsylvania Press.161
