= Jean V de Hangest =

- Seignear d' Hangest et d'Avesnecourt
- Reign: 1405-1415
- Born: c. 1350
- Died: 25 October 1415; Azincourt, France
- Noble family: Famille de Hangest
- Spouses: Marie de Roye, dame de Roye, Germini & de Moussy-le-Perreux; Geneviève de L’Isle
- Issue: Marie de Hangest, dame de Roye, Germini & de Moussy-le-Perreux; Miles, seigneur de Hangest (d.1414); Louise de Hangest, dame de Fleuri sur Andelle
- Father: Jean dit Rabache de Hangest, IV, Seigneur d'Hangest et d'Avesnecourt
- Mother: Marie de Picquigny

Jean V d'Hangest et d'Avesnecourt (c. 1350 - 25 October 1415) was a consular to the Grand Chamberlain of France and Governor of Brittany. He died at the Battle of Agincourt.

== Career ==
In 1405, he was taken prisoner at Mercq near Calais along with David de Rambures.
