= The Complaynt of Scotland =

1549 text on the Rough Wooing

The Complaynt of Scotland is a Scottish book printed in 1549 as propaganda during the war of the Rough Wooing against the Kingdom of England, and is an important work of the Scots language.

== Context and authorship ==
The book was part of the war of words between Scotland and England in the sixteenth century. English policy was directed towards Mary, Queen of Scots, marrying the son of Henry VIII, Edward, later Edward VI. English pamphlets were published promoting the idea of uniting the two countries, and the Scottish Complaynt was a response to these works. Another Scottish work, a dialogue similar in outlook, Ane Resonyng, by William Lamb from the same period was abandoned unpublished.

The Complaynt is anonymous, probably due to its dangerous political content, and has been variously ascribed to Robert Wedderburn, James Inglis and David Lyndsay, though the 1979 Scottish Text Society edition of the work supports the Wedderburn attribution, as does the National Library of Scotland It was once thought to have been among the first books printed in Scotland but it is now believed to have been published in Paris. The book owes much of its structure, and some of its content, to the French work Alain Chartier's Quadrilogue-invectif, a similar political work also attacking England.

== Letter of Dedication ==
The Complaynt was dedicated to Mary of Guise, rather than the ruler of Scotland at the time, the Regent Arran. The letter of dedication to Mary of Guise compares her to virtuous and heroic women including Valeria daughter of Publius Valerius Poplicola, Cloelia, Lucretia, Penelope, Cornelia, Semiramis, Tomyris, and Penthesilea, Queen of the Amazons. The letter next references the Biblical stories of Esther and Haman and Judith and Holofernes. After mentioning the absence of Mary, Queen of Scots in France, the author relates the story of her ancestor Godfrey de Bouillon, one of the Nine Worthies.

== Dame Scotia ==
The book itself, subtitled "wyth ane exortatione to the thre estaits to be vigilante in the deffens of their public weil", contains a miscellany of stories, classical legends, biblical tales, ballads and allegories emphasising Scotland's separateness and the rewards of virtue and courage. The unifying structure is the narration of Dame Scotia in the final twelve chapters. She hears the complaints of her three sons, the "Thrie Estaits" of Scottish society, and then offers her encouragement and rebuke to the clergy, nobility, and populace in turn.

Dame Scotia appears to the narrator in a dream. She was a lady of "ancient genealogy", her hair was the colour of fine gold but untidy, and her gold crown was "like to fall down from her head to the cold earth." She held the shield of the red lion rampant but the lion had several wounds. Her dress was made in three fashions according to her three sons, embroidered with the precious stones of the nobility which were engraved with weapons, embroidered with the texts and books of the Spirituality, and the livestock, crops, merchandise, and tools of craftsmen, merchants and farmers. However this ancient fabric was worn with many losses.

== Merlin ==
The English works it was aimed against included the pagan prophecies of Merlin to back up their claim of a united Great Britain, whilst the Complaynt stuck to Christian ideals. In Chapter 10, the author declares the English, lending more credence to Merlin's prophecies than the Gospel, justify their wars upon Scotland under the basis of nebulous prophecy that the two nations shall be ruled under one king:

"the prophesies of Merlyne, to the quhilk the Inglishmen giffis more confidens nor thai gif to the evangel, by cause that there ald prophane prophesis sais, that ingland and scotland sal be baitht undir ane prince, on this misteous prophesis, thai have intendit weyris contrar Scotland." (Note: "misteous. 'misty'. obscure." (Murray, Sir James Augustus Henry; Craigie, Sir William Alexander; Talbut, Charles, eds. (1908). A New English dictionary on historical principles. Vol. 6. Clarendon Press. p. 537.)) (Note: A variant text is perhaps somewhat harsher:"diuerse prophane prophesies of merlyne, and vther ald corruptit vaticinaris, the quhilkis hes affermit in there rusty ryme, that scotland and ingland sal be vndir ane prince," (Murray, James A. H., ed. (1875). The Romance and Prophecies of Thomas of Erceldoune: printed from five manuscripts; with illustrations from the prophetic literature of the 15th and 16th centuries. EETS O.S. Vol. 61. London: Trübner. p. xxx.))

== Monologue recreative ==
The Complaynt is an important source for information on Border ballads and it contains some of the first references to important ballads such as Tam Lin, Froggy would a-wooing go and The Ballad of Chevy Chase. The names of these songs and poems are recited in Chapter 6, called the Monologue Recreative. This dream-like sequence introduces the main 'Dame Scotia' narration. In the Monologue Recreative the author describes putting his pen down and walking into a beautiful summer day. He hears shepherds speaking of poetry and astronomy, then sees a Scottish warship and its crew and hears their calls.

This passage supplies a maritime vocabulary and an insight to seamanship of the period. The Complaynt is also a significant example of Middle Scots language, and the Oxford English Dictionary cites the Complaynt as the earliest surviving written example of numerous words, including: axis, barbarian, buffoon, cabinet, crackling, decadence, excrement, heroic, humid, imbecile, moo, parallel, robust, suffocation, superb, timid and water-lily.

== See also ==
- List of English words of Scots origin
