= Le Livre de l'Espérance =

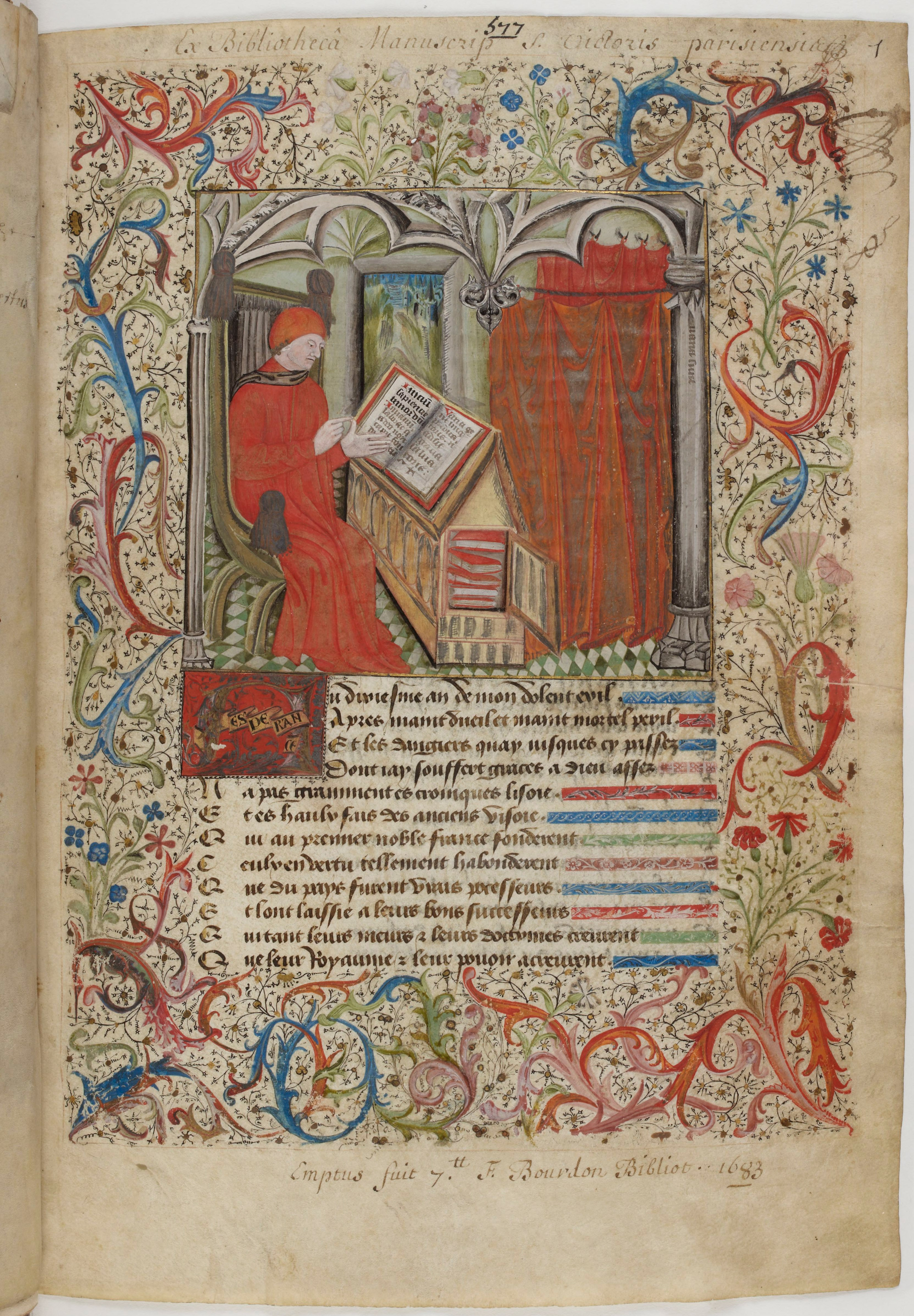
Illuminated first page of Oeuvres diverses d'Alain Chartier et pièces anonymes (Various Works of Alain Chartier and anonymous pieces), said to depict the author at his desk.

Le Livre de l’Espérance, (The Book of Hope) also called the Consolation des Trois Vertus or the Livre de l’Exile, was written by the French poet and statesman Alain Chartier. Begun in 1428 in Avignon, the work was not yet complete by the author's death in 1430. It is a lengthy dream vision and allegory of political, theological and poetic significance written in both verse and prose Middle French. Modeled on the Consolation of Philosophy of Boethius, instead of finding consolation through Dame Philosophy, it is the three Christian virtues, Faith, Hope, and Charity, who offer solace.

== Summary ==
The text is divided into three sections: the apparition of the three monsters, the consolation of Faith (Foy), and the consolation of Hope (Espérance). Presumably a final section was planned in which Charité would speak.

The prologue to the text is a poem in which the poet-narrator sets the stage. He evokes the valiant knights of yesteryear and contrasts former French glory to the current ruinous state of France, mired in civil disturbances and the Hundred Years War. Melancoly (Mélancolie) appears, wraps the narrator-poet in a grey cloak and throws him onto a bed of sadness and sickness. Then, Understanding (Entendement), a young man who embodies the narrator-poet’s capacity for reason, falls asleep, poisoned by Melancholy. The narrative continues with the entrance of the three allegorical monsters, identifiable by their attributes and attitudes: Mistrust (Défiance), Wrath (Indignation), and Despair (Désespérance). These monsters tempt the author to commit suicide, citing the hopelessness of his personal situation and that of his king and country.

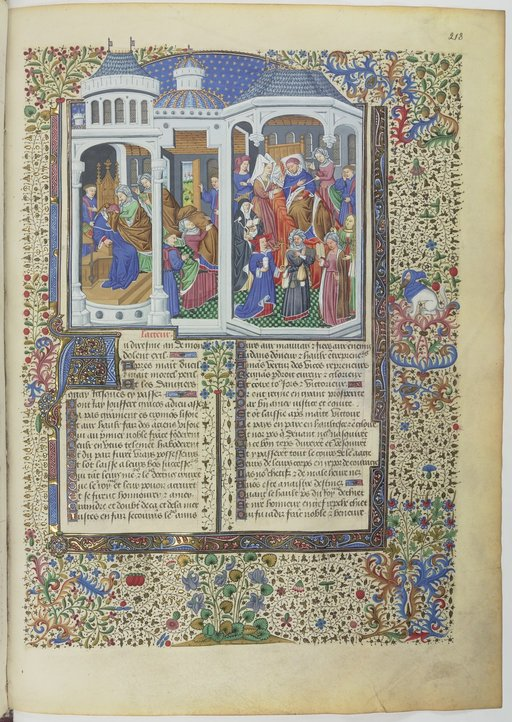
Melancholy arrives and attacks the author. The harangue of the three monsters. Understanding (Entendement) surrounded by the Three Virtues. Illuminated manuscript of a mid-15th century edition of Livre de l'Espérance.

Suddenly Nature arrives; horrified at the thought of death, she awakens Understanding from his lethargy. Thanks to Memory, a small window is opened, allowing the entrance of the three Christian virtues, and a fourth mysterious lady. Faith begins a dialogue with Understanding, leading him to reaffirm his Christian baptismal vows. Understanding then questions Faith on a number of issues that vex him, including the nature of divine justice, the suffering of innocents, the punishment of those who refuse to do God’s will, the responsibility of kings toward God and their people, divine providence, and free will. Hope, whose perfume has chased away the monsters, then takes the stage to explain the difference between Faith and Hope. She offers examples of good Hope from the Bible, among them Noah, Abraham, David, from the Old Testament, and Simeon from the New Testament. She teaches Understanding how to identify the False Hope of the world, rooted in illusions of force, beauty, friends, or money. She warns against hoping in mankind. Finally, she warns against the hope claimed by pagans, Muslims, and Jews. A lesson for the young Understanding on the value of sacrifice and prayer to strengthen Hope (the best prayer being the Lord’s Prayer) terminates the treatise. The fact that Charity has not yet spoken indicates that the work was left unfinished.

== Structure ==
The text is structured by alternating sections of poetry and prose. Such a structure is called prosimètre. The sixteen poems serve to emote and introduce each of the sixteen prose passages which further the narrative. The poems are of varying versification, most commonly of seven or three syllables. The rhyme schemes are equally variable. The complexities of these variations demonstrate the prowess of the poet who was highly respected and often imitated by his peers and by succeeding generations throughout Europe.

== Editions and Manuscripts ==
Chartier, Alain. Le Livre de l'Espérance. Ed. François Rouy. Brest: 1967. Print.

Chartier, Alain. Les Oeuvres de Maistre Alain Chartier. Ed. André Du Chesne. Paris: S. Thiboust, 1617.

37 manuscripts of the text survive and are housed in libraries and private collections throughout the world. One manuscript and several images of another can be consulted online through the Bibliothèque nationale de France.

Oeuvres diverses d'Alain Chartier et pièces anonymes. Bibliothèque nationale de France, fonds français 24440.

Le Livre de l'Espérance. Bibliothèque nationale de France, fonds français 126. c. 1450.
