= Archer's stake =

15-16th century anti-cavalry defence used by longbowmen

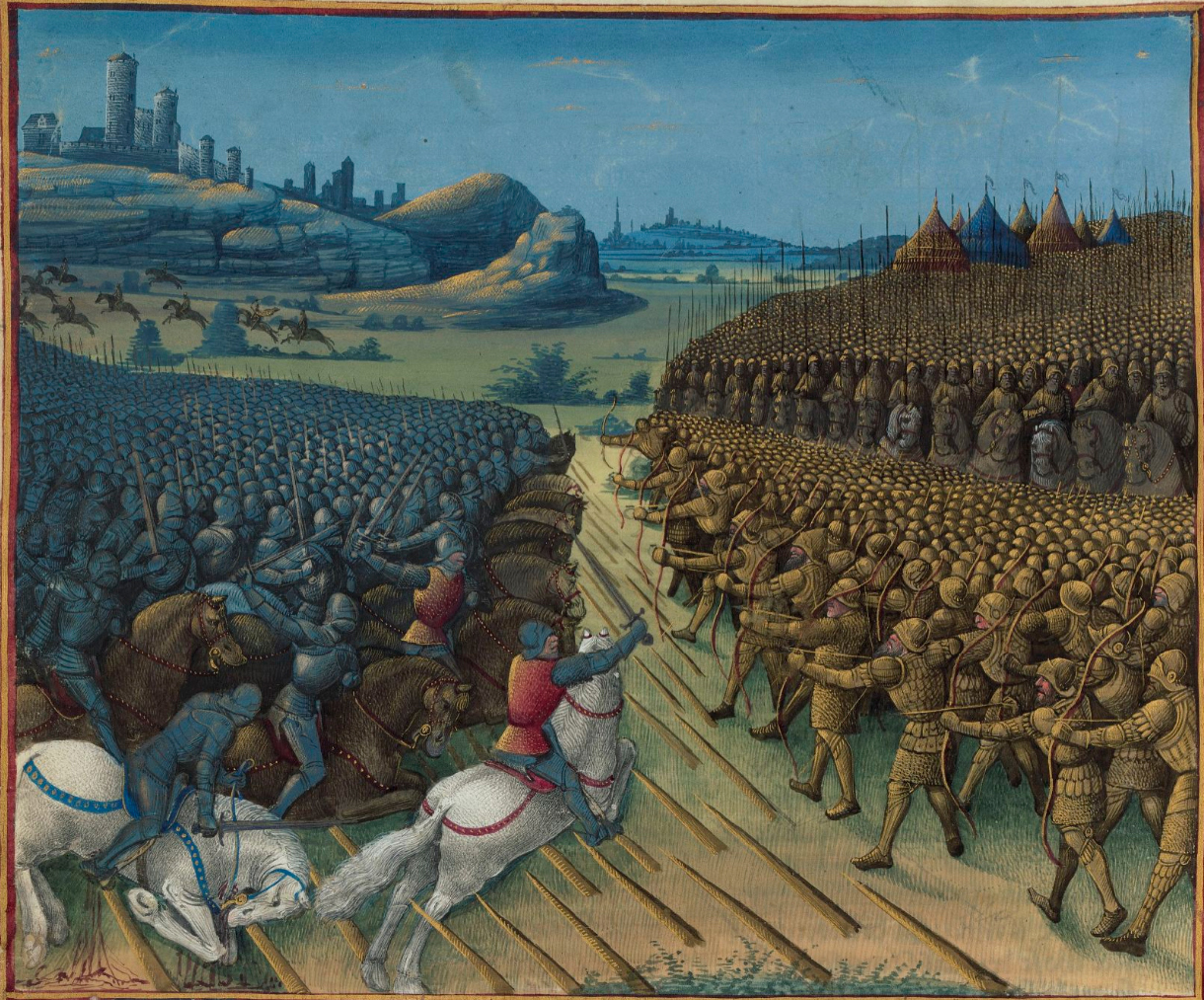
Archer's stakes in the Battle of Nicopolis (painting from the 15th century, Passages d'outremer)

An archer's stake was an anti-cavalry defence used by longbowmen in the 15th and 16th centuries.

== Origins ==
At the Battle of Nicopolis in 1396 Turkish archers were stationed behind a barrier of stakes. This may have inspired Henry V when he instructed his men to provide themselves with six foot stakes, which were to be planted in front of them at an angle to impale horses of attacking French men-at-arms prior to the Battle of Agincourt, in 1415.

== Deployment ==
There are three schools of thought about the deployment of stakes. The traditional view is that all the stakes were placed in front of the front rank to create a fence. In 1976, John Keegan proposed that each archer placed his stake in front of him where he stood in the ranks, thus creating a defensive belt of stakes several yards wide within which the archers operated. Keegan's proposal has been challenged by Clifford J. Rogers, who argues that most stakes were placed in a fence arrangement, with staggered gaps for archers to move through, in combination with a band of more widely spaced stakes.

== Usage ==
After the Agincourt campaign, stakes became a common piece of equipment for the English longbowman fighting in France. After the end of the Hundred Years War, stakes continued to be used, for example at the Battle of Blore Heath during the Wars of the Roses and by the English mercenaries at the Battle of Montlhéry during the War of the Public Weal. Tudor archers also used stakes in the early 16th century. Henry VIII's army which invaded France in 1513 carried 5000 stakes in wagons and iron-bound archers' stakes are mentioned on several occasions thereafter.
