= Parc et Roseraie du Château de Rambures =

Private park with arboretum and rose garden located at the Château de Rambures

Coordinates: 49°56′39″N 1°42′27″E

Parc et Roseraie du Château de Rambures

The Parc et Roseraie du Château de Rambures (10 hectares) is a private park with arboretum and rose garden located at the Château de Rambures, 8, rue du Château, Rambures, Somme, Picardie, France. It has been recognized as a Jardin Remarquable by the French Ministry of Culture and is open to the public.

An English-style park surrounds the 15th-century fortress, a listed monument since 1840, and its 18th-century outbuildings. It contains a number of very old trees. In 1987, about 30 trees were registered as an arboretum by the Amiens Forestry Management Organisation, including an ancient white mulberry tree and giant sequoia, 200 years old, brought back from the United States in 1787 by the Marquis de la Roche-Fontenilles. Lindens, poplars, oaks and conifers comprise the rest of the arboretum, with notable specimens including Acer pseudoplatanus, Aesculus hippocastanum, Carpinus betulus, Carya ovata, Chamaecyparis lawsoniana, Larix decidua, Picea excelsa and Pinus nigra corsicata.

The park has been augmented with a rose garden, planted in 2003, containing some 2500 bushes representing more than 390 rose varieties, and a jardin des simples in the medieval style.

== See also ==
- List of botanical gardens in France
