= Alain Chartier =

French poet, diplomat and political writer

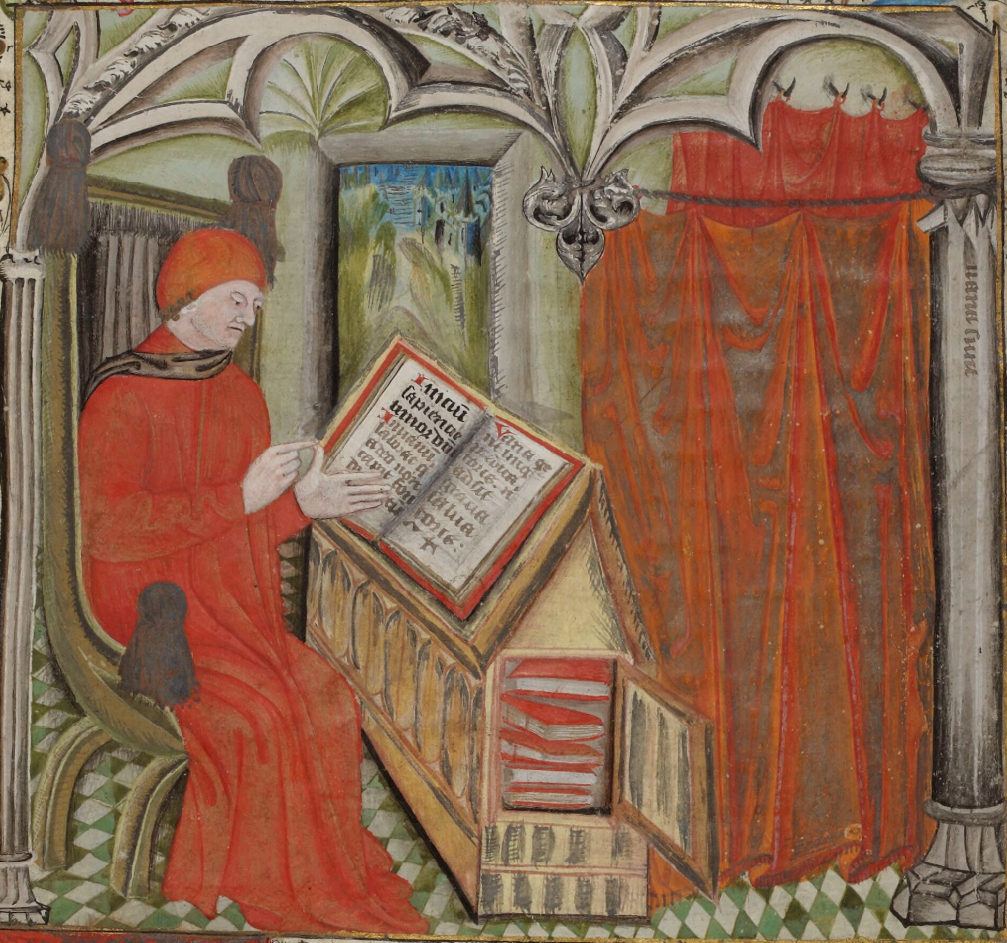
Probable representation of Alain Chartier from a copy of his Livre de l'Espérance

Alain Chartier (c. 1385 – 1430) was a French poet, diplomat and political writer.

== Life ==
Alain Chartier was born in Bayeux to a family marked by considerable ability. His eldest brother Guillaume became bishop of Paris; and Thomas Chartier became notary to the king. Jean Chartier, a monk of St Denis, whose history of Charles VII is printed in vol. III. of Les Grands Chroniques de Saint-Denis (1477), is also said to have been a brother of the poet. Alain studied, as his elder brother had done, at the University of Paris. He then went to work for the Duke Louis and Yolande of Anjou, whose daughter Marie was engaged to the youngest son of Charles VI. He followed the fortunes of the dauphin, afterwards Charles VII, acting in the triple capacity of clerk, notary, and financial secretary. He later would become a member of several important ambassadorial trips, serving as orator and secretary for Charles VII, travelling to Vienna and Buda to see Sigismund; to Venice to appear before the Senate, to Rome to deliver a letter to the Pope, and to Scotland to negotiate the marriage of the daughter of James I, Margaret, then not four years old, with the dauphin, afterwards Louis XI. He appears to have taken holy orders and was named canon of Paris, rector of the parish of Saint-Lambert-des-Levées, and even Archbishop of Paris. He died in Avignon in 1430; the reason for his presence there remains a mystery. An epitaph for his tomb was commissioned by his brother Guillaume Chartier, but the stone has not survived.

== Literary career ==
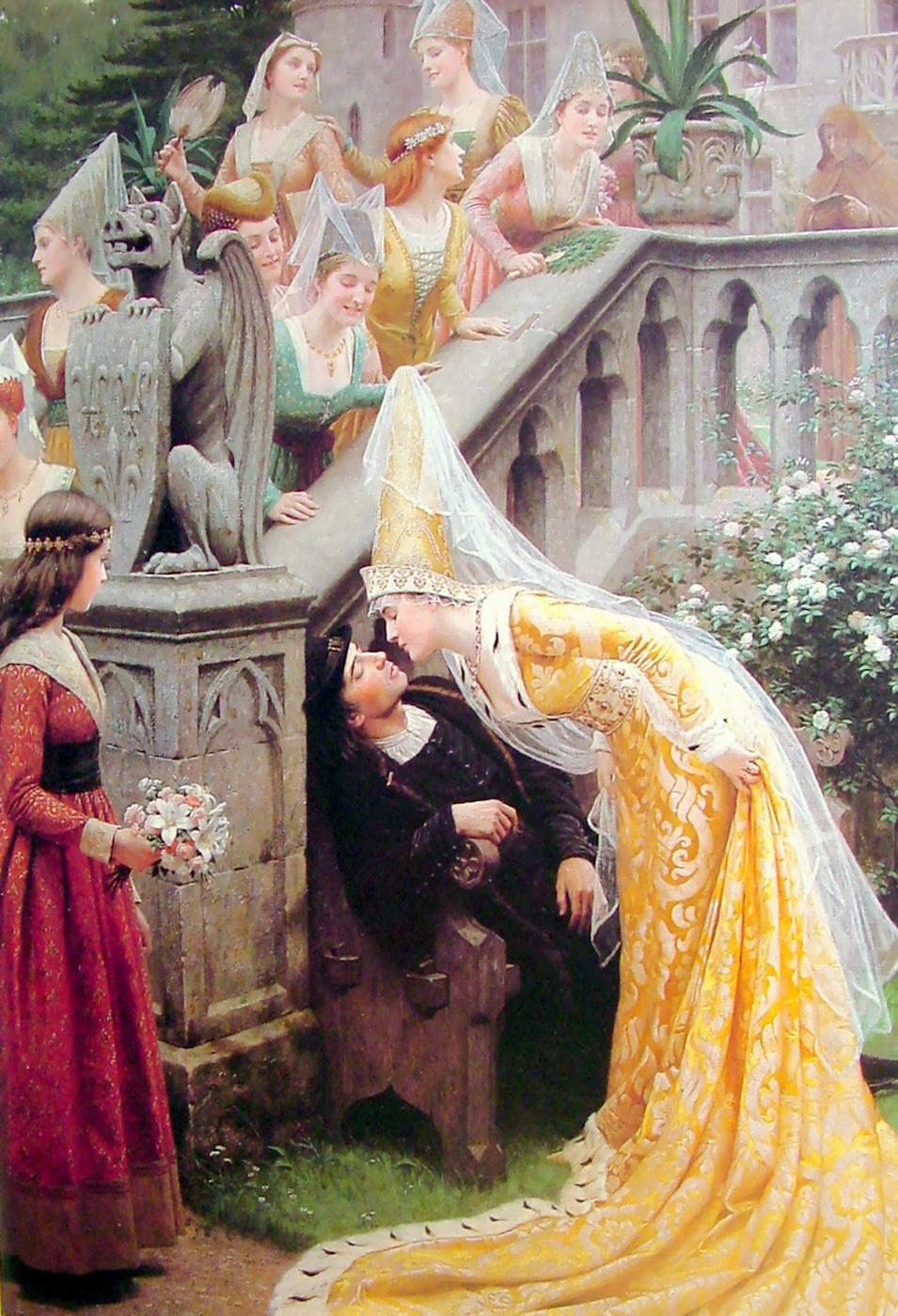
Alain Chartier by Edmund Leighton, depicting the kiss from Margaret Stewart, Dauphine of France

Alain's earliest poems were likely the Lai de Plaisance (Lay of Pleasure) followed by the Débat des Deux Fortunés en Amours (Debate of the Two Lovers) also called the Débat du Gras et du Maigre (Debate of the Fat and the Thin). The Livre des Quatre Dames (1416) was written after the Battle of Agincourt in 1415. In 1422 he wrote the famous Quadrilogue invectif. The interlocutors in this dialogue are an allegorical representation of France and the three orders of the state, the Clergy, Knight, and People. Chartier lays bare the abuses of the feudal army and the sufferings of the peasants. He maintains that the cause of France, though desperate to all appearance, was not yet lost if the contending factions could lay aside their differences in the face of the common enemy. He also wrote Débat du reveille-matin (1422–26?), La Belle Dame sans Mercy (1424), and others. In 1429 he wrote the Livre de l'Espérance, which contains a fierce attack on the nobility and clergy. He was the author of a diatribe on the courtiers of Charles VII, entitled Le Curial, translated into English by William Caxton about 1484.

== Interpretation ==
The story of the famous kiss bestowed by Margaret Stewart, Dauphine of France on la précieuse bouche de laquelle sont issus et sortis tant de bons mots et vertueuses paroles ('The invaluable mouth from which issued and which left so many witty remarks and virtuous words'), first told by Guillaume Bouchet in his Annales d'Aquitaine (1524), is interesting, if only as a proof of the high degree of estimation in which he was held. Jean de Masies, who annotated a portion of his verse, has recorded how the pages and young gentlemen of that epoch were required daily to learn by heart passages of his Breviaire des nobles. John Lydgate studied him affectionately. His Belle Dame sans mercy was translated into English in the 15th century by Sir Richard Ros, with an introduction of his own; and Clément Marot and Octavien de Saint-Gelais, writing fifty years after his death, find many fair words for the old poet, their master and predecessor.

The English Romantic poet John Keats famously wrote the ballad 'La Belle Dame Sans Merci', using the title from Alain Chartier.

== Works ==
=== Works in Latin ===
- Discours au roi (Charles VI) sur les libertés de l'Église (1412?)
- Epistula ad fratrem suum juvenem
- Francigenæ magni, gens fortis et inclita bello...
- Lettre à l'Université de Paris (probably around 1419)
- Premier discours de la mission d'Allemagne
- Second discours de la mission d'Allemagne
- Discours au roi d'Écosse (1428)
- Persuasio ad Pragenses de fide deviantes
- Ad detestationem belli Gallici et suasionem pacis (1423)
- Dialogus familiaris Amici et Sodalis super deplorationem Gallicæ calamitatis (approximately 1427)
- Invectiva ad ingratum amicum
- Invectiva ad invidum et detractorem
- Tractatus de vita curiali
- Lettre sur Jeanne d'Arc (1429)

=== Works in French ===
- Le Débat des deux fortunés d'amour (Le Débat du gras et du maigre, approximately 1412/1414)
- Le Lay de plaisance (approximately 1412/1414)
- Le Livre des quatre dames (1416)
- Le Quadrilogue invectif (Livre des trois estaz nommé Quadrilogue, 1422)
- Le Bréviaire des nobles (approximately between 1422 and 1426)
- Le Débat de réveille matin de deux amoureux (1423?)
- La Complainte contre la mort de sa dame (1424)
- La Belle Dame sans mercy (1424)
- L'Excusation (1425)
- Le Lay de paix (approximately between 1424 and 1426)
- Le Débat du hérault, du vassault et du villain (or Le Débat patriotique, between 1422 and 1425)
- Le Livre de l'Espérance (or Consolation des trois vertus, 1429)
