= La Belle Dame sans Mercy =

French poem by Alain Chartier

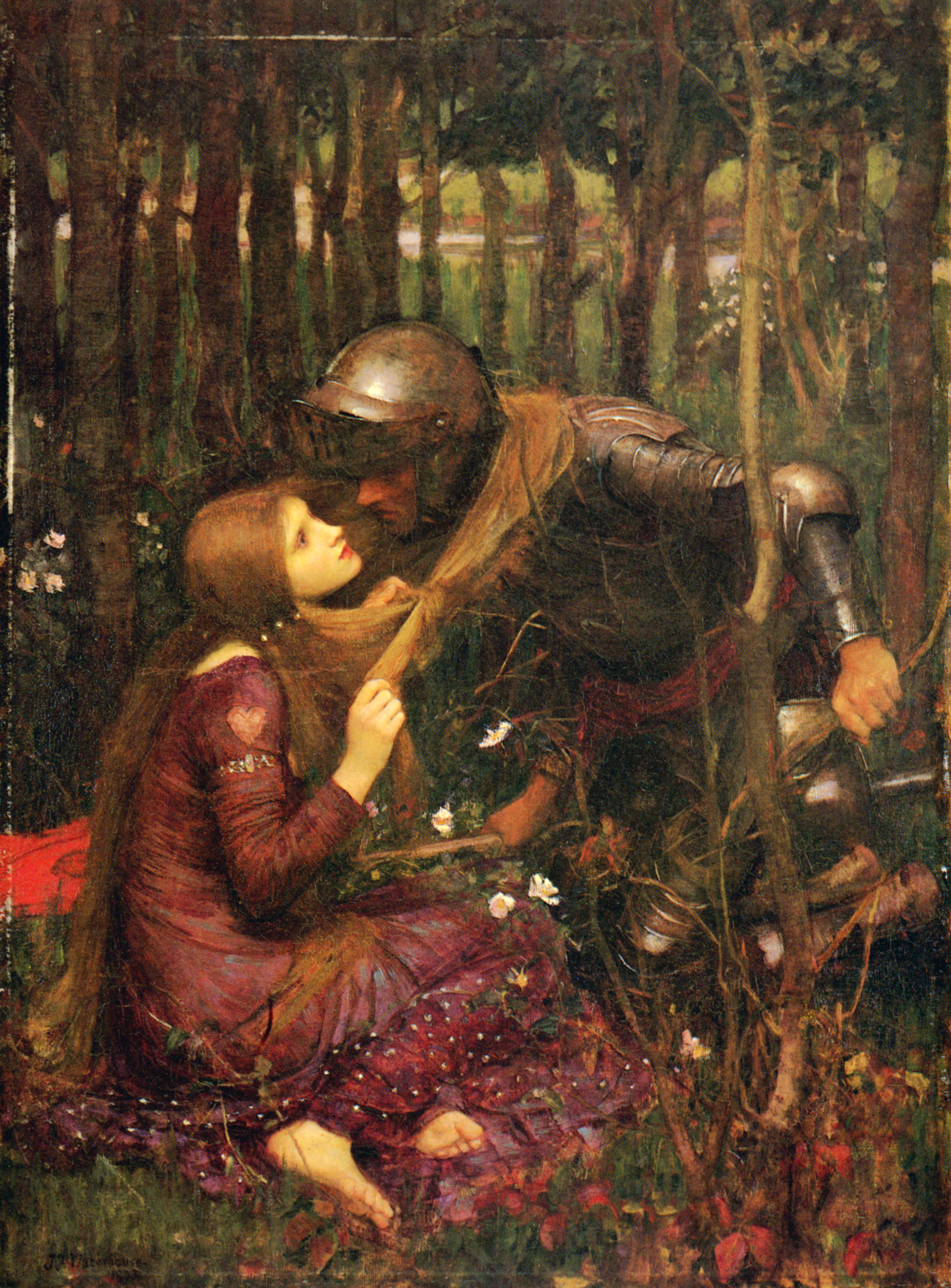
La Belle Dame sans Merci by John William Waterhouse, circa 1893

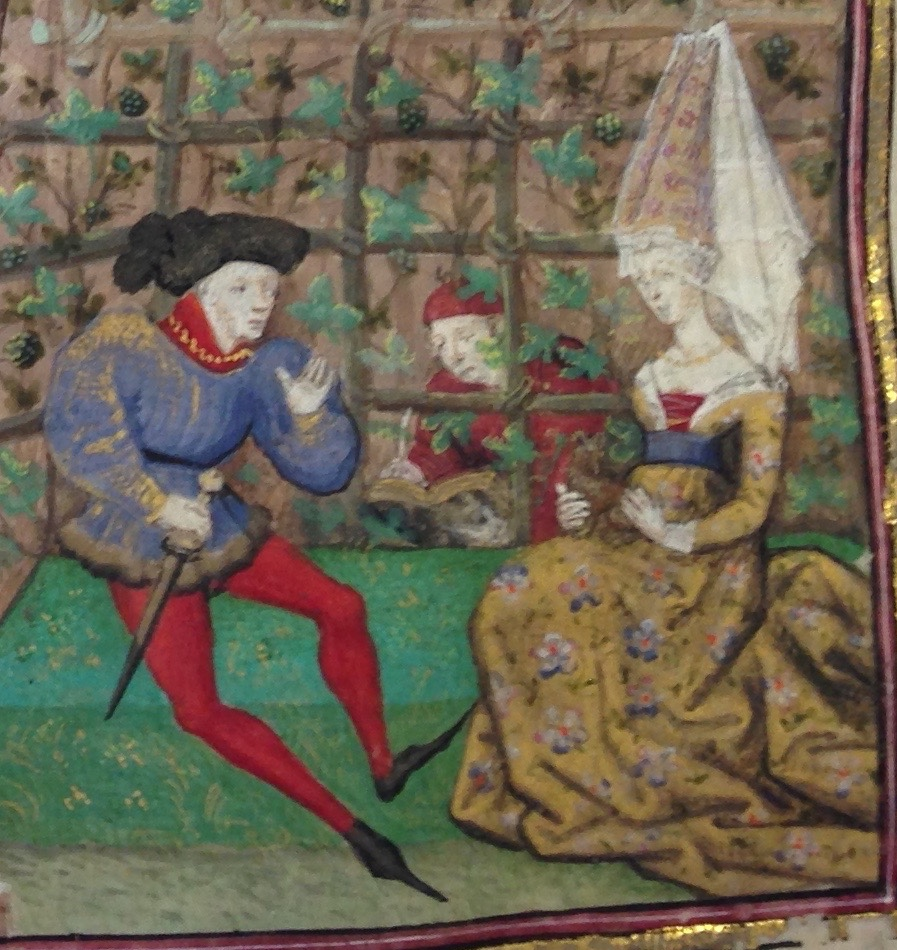
La Belle Dame sans mercy, Detail from Yale, Beinecke 1216

La Belle Dame sans Mercy is a French narrative debate poem on courtly love written by Alain Chartier in 1424.

== Structure ==
The poem is written in a series of eight verse stanzas (huitains), each line of which contains eight syllables (octosyllabes), a style later imitated by the poet François Villon in the "Ballade des dames du temps jadis." In the debate, Lover and the Lady present their arguments in alternating octaves.

The rhyme scheme is ABABBCBC with crossed rhymes (rimes croisées).

== Narrative ==
La Belle Dame sans Mercy is composed of 100 stanzas of alternating dialogue between a male lover (L'amant) and the lady he is wooing (la Dame). Their dialogue is framed by the observations of the narrator-poet who is mourning the recent death of his lady.

In the first 24 stanzas the first person narrator describes his state of mourning as a most unhappy lover ("le plus dolent des amoureux"). He embarks alone on horseback, driven to wander by Sadness (Tristesse) and divested of his capacity to feel by Death (Mort). After wandering for a time, the narrator-poet finds himself obliged to attend a party with two of his friends. It is at this party that the poet observes the unhappy lover, with whom he can empathize, and his lady. At the end of the twenty-fourth stanza, the narrator-poet takes on the role of silent observer, hiding himself behind a trellis. He listens to and then claims to transcribe the conversation between the melancholy lover and the lady. The lover, in traditional love language, offers multiple reasons for the lady to accept him as her lover; the lady refuses to acquiesce in witty and reasoned ripostes. In the last four stanzas the poet-narrator takes over the narrative to give the moral of the poem.

== Editions ==
- Alain Chartier, Baudet Herenc and Achille Caulier, Le Cycle de la Belle Dame sans Mercy : une anthologie poétique du XVe siècle (BNF MS FR. 1131), Edition bilingue établie, traduite, présentée et annotée par David F. Hult et Joan E. McRae. Paris : Champion, 2003.
- Alain Chartier, Alain Chartier: The Quarrel of the Belle Dame sans Mercy. Ed. and trans. Joan E. McRae. New York: Routledge, 2004.
- Alain Chartier, The Poetical Works of Alain Chartier. Ed. J.C. Laidlaw. Cambridge: Cambridge University Press, 1973.
