= Rambures =

- Commune
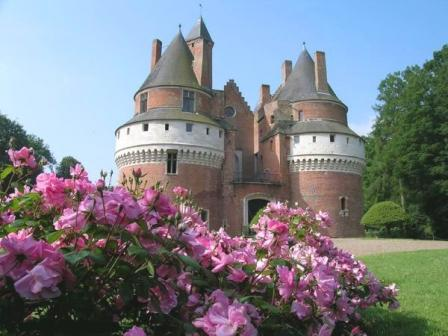
- The chateau in Rambures

- Coat of arms
- Location of Rambures
- Location within France Location within Hauts-de-France
- Coordinates: 49°56′38″N 1°42′15″E
- Country: France
- Region: Hauts-de-France
- Department: Somme
- Arrondissement: Amiens
- Canton: Poix-de-Picardie
- Intercommunality: CC Somme Sud-Ouest

Government
  - Mayor (2020–2026): Fabrice Vue
- Area^{1}: 9.9 km^{2} (3.8 sq mi)
- Elevation: 139 m (456 ft)
- Highest elevation: 181 m (594 ft)
- Lowest elevation: 122 m (400 ft)
- Population (2023): 379
  - Density: 38/km^{2} (99/sq mi)
- Time zone: UTC+01:00 (CET)
  - Summer (DST): UTC+02:00 (CEST)
- INSEE/Postal code: 80663 /80140
- ^{1} French Land Register data, which excludes lakes, ponds, glaciers > 1 km^{2} (0.386 sq mi or 247 acres) and river estuaries.

Rambures (French pronunciation: [ʁɑ̃byʁ]) is a commune in the Somme department in Hauts-de-France in northern France.

== Geography ==
Rambures is situated on the D180 and D110 crossroads, some 15 miles (24 km) southwest of Abbeville.

Apples of the variety named Rambour originated here.

== Population ==
Historical population
Year	Pop.	±% p.a.
1968	444	—
1975	404	−1.34%
1982	363	−1.52%
1990	367	+0.14%
1999	365	−0.06%
2007	410	+1.46%
2012	376	−1.72%
2017	343	−1.82%
2023	379	+1.68%
Source: INSEE

== Places of interest ==
- The Château de Rambures, an unusual fortress, being built almost entirely of bricks, the only example of its kind in Picardie. Its park contains a rose garden and remarkable trees (Parc et Roseraie du Château de Rambures).

== See also ==
- Communes of the Somme department
