= Quadrilogue invectif =

1422 work by Alain Chartier

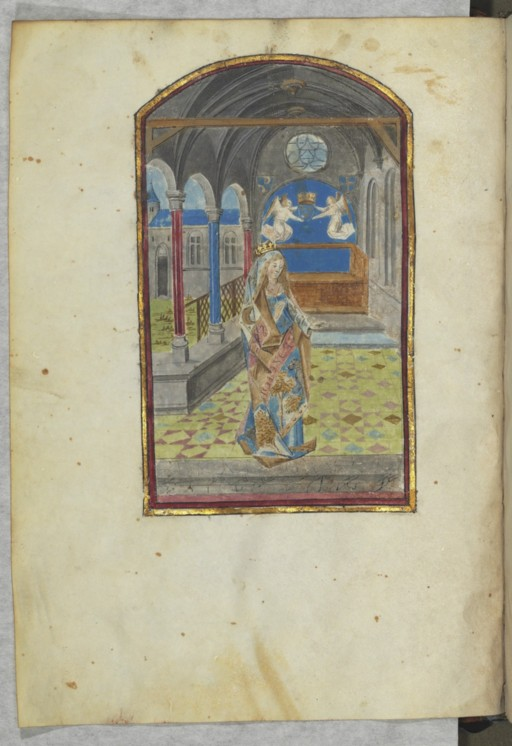
Quadrilogue invectif

The Quadrilogue invectif is a work of allegorical prose written by Alain Chartier in 1422 in which the author, through the use of a fictional dialogue between the Three Estates ("Le Peuple," "Le Chevalier," and "Le Clerge") and France, personified as a woman, exposes the suffering and oppression of the lower classes.

It was originally published as a pamphlet and in the vernacular, its impact as a vigorous and harshly critical appeal for the unity of France against the English during the Hundred Years War.

The work's impact was felt far beyond France; it was translated into English by at least two authors during the fifteenth century and was the main source for The Complaynt of Scotland written more than a century later when Scotland too was at war with England.
