= Jean Chartier (chronicler) =

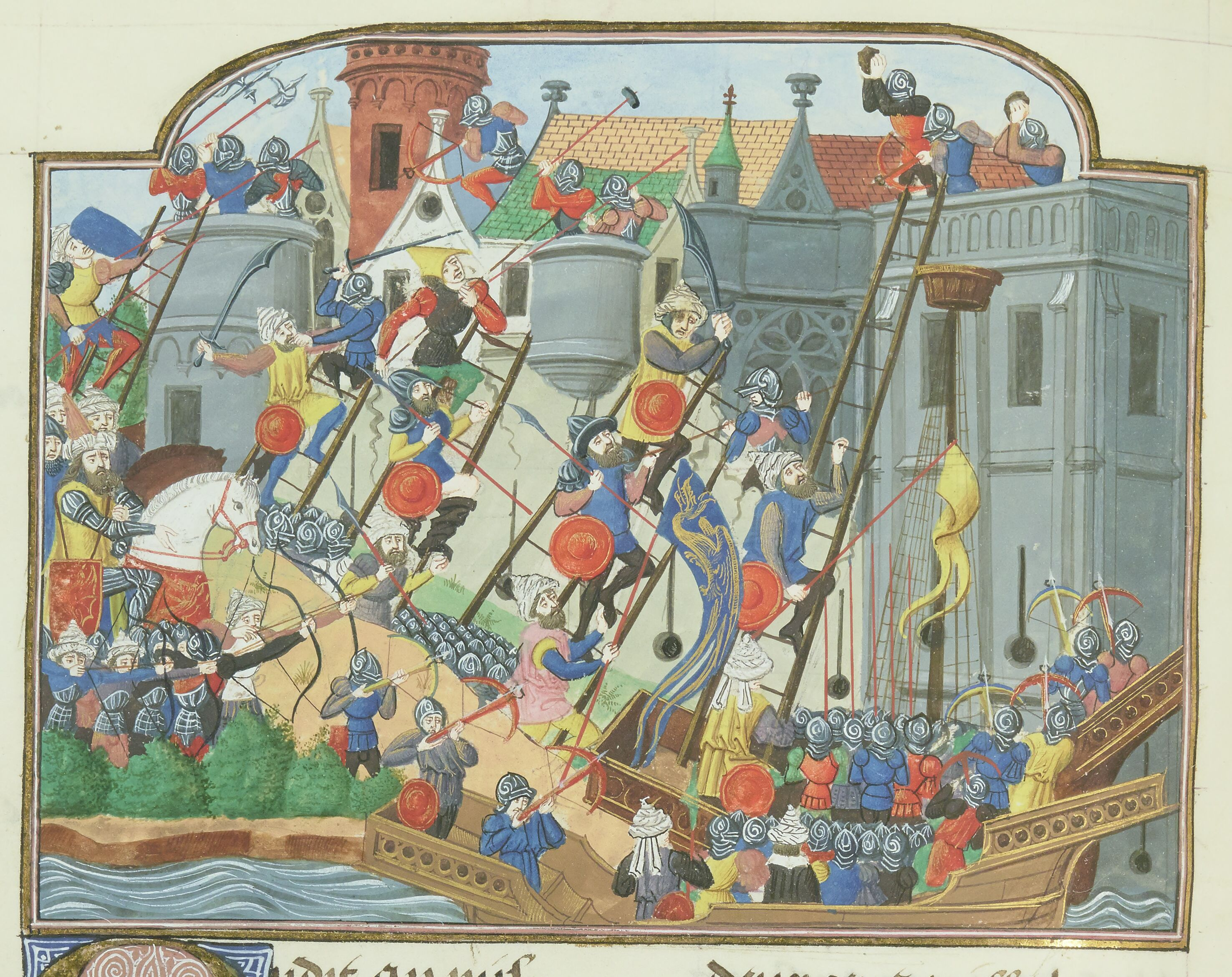
Siege of Constantinople, miniature from a chronicle of Jean Chartier, c. 1460.

Jean Chartier (Note: Johannes Charretier in Latin.) (c.1385 – 19 February 1464) was a French chronicler and monk of the Abbey of Saint-Denis known for his chronicle of Charles VII.

== Life ==
Chartier was born in Bayeux in 1385-1390. In his Chronique latine he claims to have worked on a chronicle of the reign of Charles VI from 1407, assisting Michel Pintoin. He was first mentioned in the capitular records of the Abbey of Saint-Denis in 1430 as the prévôt of la Garenne. By 1435 he was the commander and hostiler of the Abbey. On 18 November 1437 he was made the official chronicler of the king. In 1441 Chartier and three other officials were assigned by the king to the administration of the temporal affairs of the Abbey. In the same year, following the death of Hue Pain on 1 November, he become the cantor of the Abbey. In 1450 he accompanied Charles VII on a campaign to Normandy to besiege the English-held Harfleur. He was still cantor when he died on 19 February 1464.

== Work ==
He finished the chronicle of Charles VI, known as Historia Karoli Sexti Francorum regis, after Pintoin's death c. 1420. He then wrote his Chronique latine, covering the years 1422 to 1450, and his Chronique de Charles VII roi de France, covering the entire reign of Charles VII, which was later included in the Grandes Chroniques de France.

== Bibliography ==
- Samaran, Charles (1926). La Chronique latine inédite de Jean Chartier (1422-1450) et les derniers livres du Religieux de Saint-Denis Paris: Bibliothèque de l'école des chartes
- Vallet de Viriville, August (1857). Essais critiques sur les historiens originaux du du règne de Charles VII Paris: Bibliothèque de l'école des chartes
