= Azincourt =

- Commune
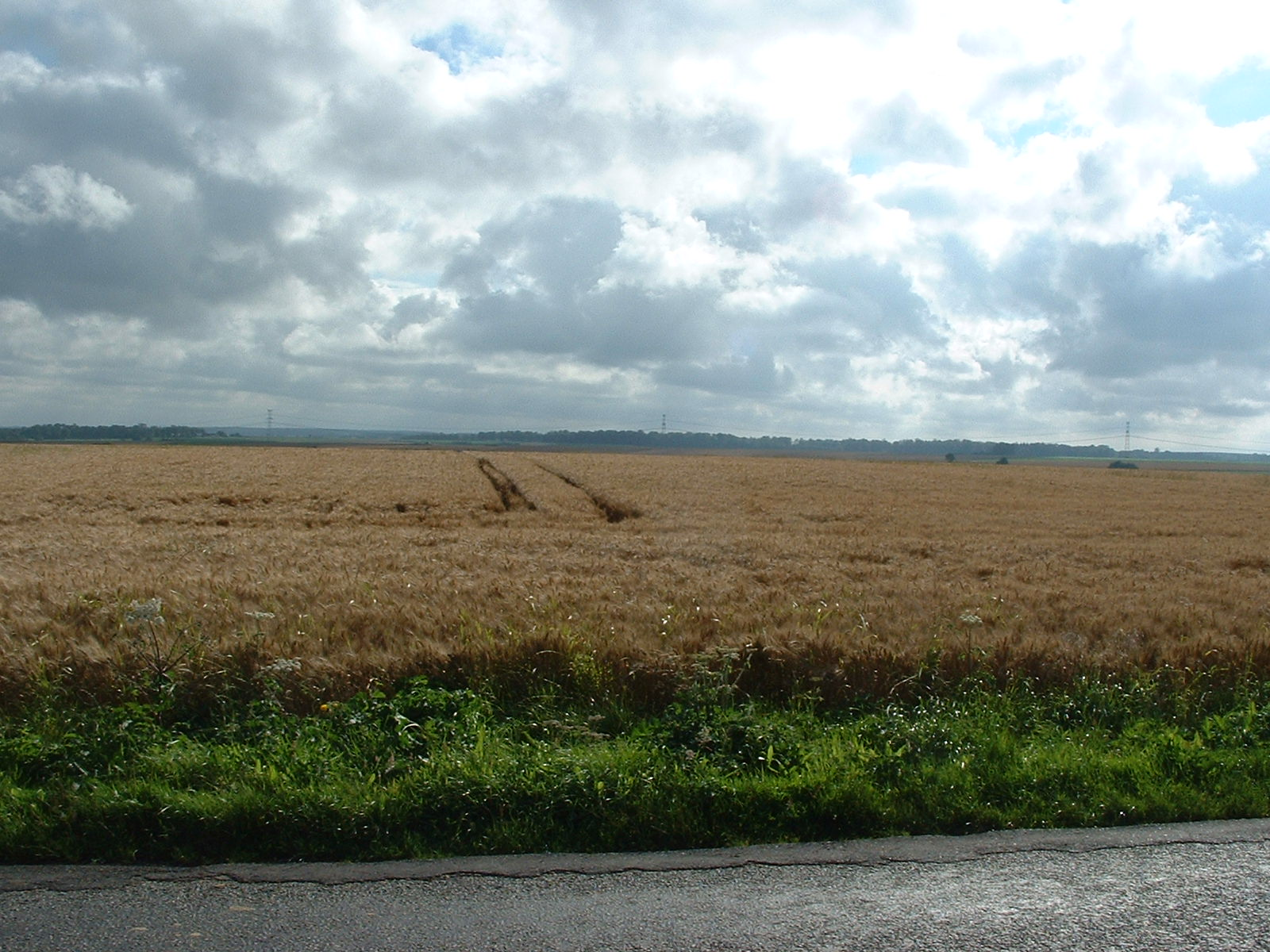
- Site of the battle of Azincourt

- Coat of arms
- Location of Azincourt
- Location within France Location within Hauts-de-France
- Coordinates: 50°28′N 2°08′E
- Country: France
- Region: Hauts-de-France
- Department: Pas-de-Calais
- Arrondissement: Montreuil
- Canton: Auxi-le-Château
- Intercommunality: CC des 7 Vallées

Government
  - Mayor (2020–2026): Nicolas Poclet
- Area^{1}: 8.46 km^{2} (3.27 sq mi)
- Highest elevation: 142 m (466 ft)
- Lowest elevation: 100 m (330 ft)
- Population (2023): 302
  - Density: 35.7/km^{2} (92.5/sq mi)
- Time zone: UTC+01:00 (CET)
  - Summer (DST): UTC+02:00 (CEST)
- INSEE/Postal code: 62069 /62310
- ^{1} French Land Register data, which excludes lakes, ponds, glaciers > 1 km^{2} (0.386 sq mi or 247 acres) and river estuaries.

Azincourt (/ˈæzɪnkɔːr(t)/ AZ-in-kor(t) ; French pronunciation: [azɛ̃kuʁ]) is a commune in the Pas-de-Calais department in northern France. It is situated 19 kilometres (12 mi) north-west of Saint-Pol-sur-Ternoise on the D71 road between Hesdin and Fruges.

The Late Medieval Battle of Agincourt between the English and the French took place in the commune in 1415.

== Toponym ==
The name is attested as Aisincurt in 1175, derived from a Germanic masculine name Aizo, Aizino and the early Northern French word curt (which meant a farm with a courtyard; derived from the Late Latin cortem). It is often known as Agincourt in English. There is a village that is named "Agincourt", located in the Meurthe-et-Moselle department in Eastern France. The name has no etymological link with Azincourt, and is derived separately from another Germanic male name *Ingin-.

== History ==
Azincourt is known for being near the site of the battle fought on 25 October 1415 in which the army led by King Henry V of England defeated the forces led by Charles d'Albret on behalf of Charles VI of France, which has gone down in history as the Battle of Agincourt. According to M. Forrest, the French knights were so encumbered by their armour that they were exhausted even before the start of the battle.

After he became king in 1509, Henry VIII is purported to have commissioned an English translation of a Life of Henry V so that he could emulate him, on the grounds that he thought that launching a campaign against France would help him to impose himself on the European stage. In 1513, Henry VIII crossed the English Channel, stopping by at Azincourt.

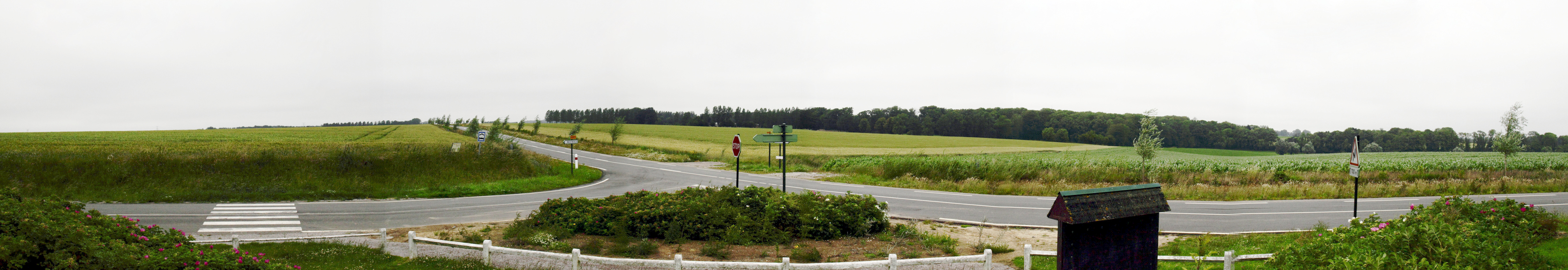
The battlefield today

The battle, as was the tradition, was named after a nearby castle called Azincourt. The castle has since disappeared and the settlement now known as Azincourt adopted the name in the seventeenth century.

John Cassell wrote in 1857 that "the village of Azincourt itself is now a group of dirty farmhouses and wretched cottages, but where the hottest of the battle raged, between that village and the commune of Tramecourt, there still remains a wood precisely corresponding with the one in which Henry placed his ambush; and there are yet existing the foundations of the castle of Azincourt, from which the king named the field."

== Population ==
Historical population
Year	Pop.	±% p.a.
1968	220	—
1975	210	−0.66%
1982	228	+1.18%
1990	250	+1.16%
1999	273	+0.98%
2007	291	+0.80%
2012	303	+0.81%
2017	307	+0.26%
2023	302	−0.27%
Source: INSEE

== Sights ==
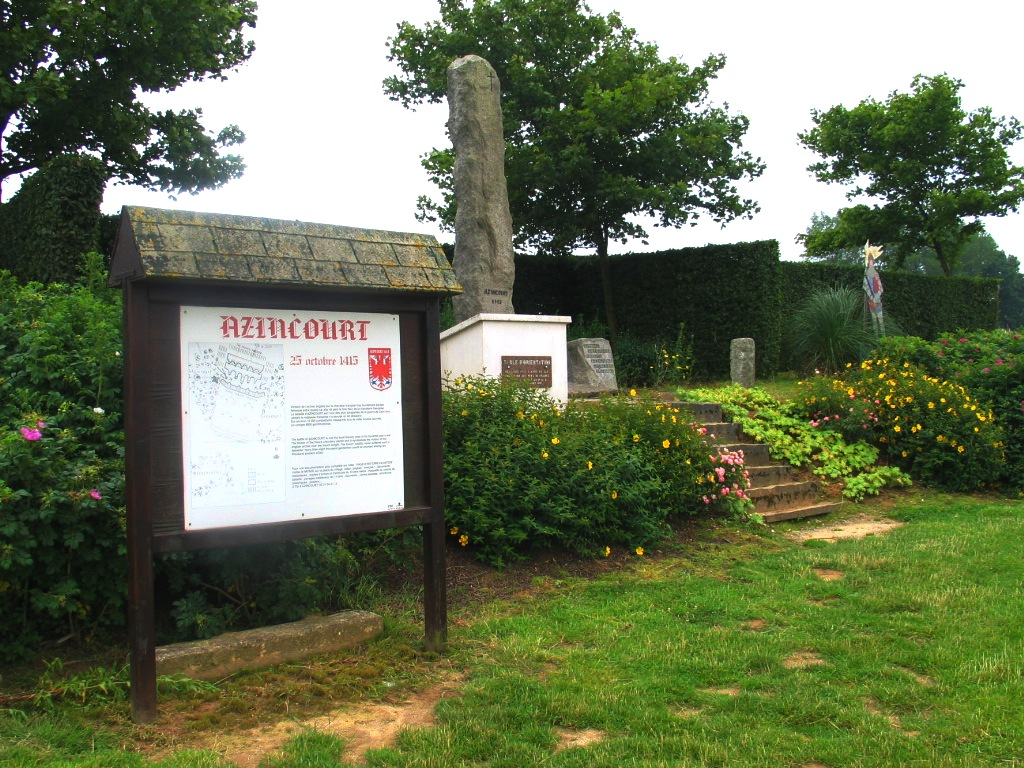
Commemorative monument near the battlefield

The original battlefield museum in the village featured model knights made out of Action Man figures. This has now been replaced by the Centre historique médiéval d'Azincourt (CHM)—a more professional museum, conference centre and exhibition space incorporating laser, video, slide shows, audio commentaries, and some interactive elements. The museum building is shaped like a longbow similar to those used at the battle by archers under King Henry.

Since 2004 a large medieval festival organised by the local community, the CHM, The Azincourt Alliance, and various other UK societies commemorating the battle, local history and medieval life, arts and crafts has been held in the village. Prior to this date the festival was held in October, but due to the inclement weather and local heavy clay soil (like the battle) making the festival difficult, it was moved to the last Sunday in July.

== International relations ==
Azincourt is twinned with Middleham, United Kingdom.

== See also ==
- Communes of the Pas-de-Calais department
- The neighbourhood of Agincourt, Toronto, Canada, named for Azincourt, not Agincourt, Meurthe-et-Moselle
