= Rouvray =

Rouvray may refer to the following communes in France:

- Rouvray, Côte-d'Or, in the Côte-d'Or département
- Rouvray, Eure, in the Eure département
- Rouvray, Yonne, in the Yonne département
- Rouvray-Catillon, in the Seine-Maritime département
- Rouvray-Saint-Denis, in the Eure-et-Loir département
- Rouvray-Sainte-Croix, in the Loiret département
- Rouvray-Saint-Florentin, in the Eure-et-Loir département
