= Jeanne de Preuilly =

15th-century French noblewoman

- Lady of Gaucourt
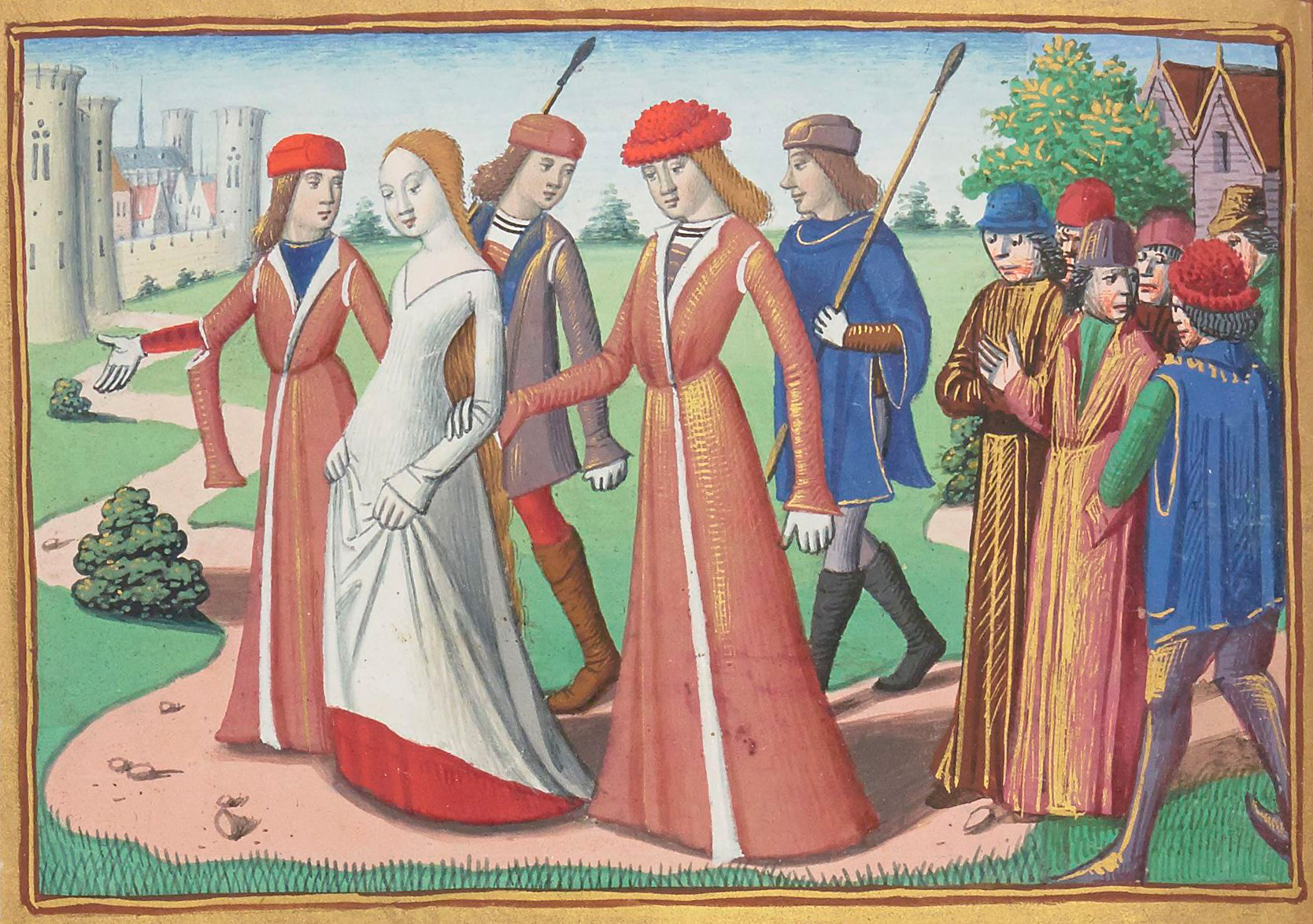
- Jeanne de Preuilly (left) and the Lady of Trèves escorting Joan of Arc to Chinon.
- Born: before 1413
- Died: 1455
- Noble family: House of Preuilly
- Spouse: Raoul de Gaucourt
- Issue: Charles de Gaucourt; Jean de Gaucourt; Raoul de Gaucourt; Marie de Gaucourt
- Father: Gilles de Preuilly
- Mother: Marguerite de Naillac
- Occupation: Lady-in-waiting to Yolande of Aragon

Jeanne de Preuilly (born before 1413 – died 1455), also known as the Dame de Gaucourt (Lady of Gaucourt) through her marriage to Raoul de Gaucourt, was a French noblewoman and lady-in-waiting. She is historically noted as one of the two women appointed to examine Joan of Arc at Chinon in 1429 to verify her gender and virginity.

== Biography ==
One of five sisters, she was the younger daughter of Gilles de Preuilly and Marguerite de Naillac. She was born before 1413, as her father was killed in November 1411 during the Armagnac–Burgundian Civil War at the bridge of Saint-Cloud.

Between 1420 and 1430, she married Raoul de Gaucourt, a prominent counselor and First Chamberlain to King Charles VII. Her husband was a veteran soldier and a companion-in-arms of Joan of Arc. Jeanne served in the household of Yolande of Aragon, the King's mother-in-law, as a lady-in-waiting. She died in 1455.

=== Role in the examination of Joan of Arc ===
Jeanne de Preuilly appears in the records of the Nullity trial of Joan of Arc (the rehabilitation trial), which took place between 1455 and 1456. Jean Pasquerel, Joan's chaplain and confessor, gave a deposition on 4 May 1456 regarding Joan's arrival at Chinon:

I have heard it said that when she came to the King, Joan was visited twice by women to see what she was, and whether she was man or woman, and if she were a virgin or deflowered; she was found to be a woman, and a virgin. She was visited, so I heard, by the Lady of Gaucourt and the Lady of Trèves.

— Jean Pasquerel, 1456

The "Lady of Gaucourt" mentioned is Jeanne de Preuilly, and the "Lady of Trèves" was Jeanne de Mortemer, wife of Robert Le Maçon, Lord of Trèves. This physical examination was a crucial step in the medieval process to ensure that Joan was not a witch or a fraud, as it was believed that the Devil could not have a "pact" with a virgin.

Jeanne de Preuilly is likely one of the two ladies depicted escorting Joan of Arc in the illumination on folio 55v of Martial d'Auvergne's Vigiles du roi Charles VII (c. 1484).

== Issue ==
Jeanne and Raoul de Gaucourt had four children:

- Charles de Gaucourt (died 1482), Lieutenant General and Governor of Paris.
- Jean de Gaucourt (died 1468), Bishop and Duke of Laon and a Peer of France.
- Raoul de Gaucourt, Lord of Luzarches.
- Marie de Gaucourt (died c. 1464–1469), maid of honor to Queen Marie of Anjou, who married Charles de Tournon in 1456 and later René Cossa, Lord of Marignane.

== Heraldry ==
Arms of the House of Preuilly

Arms of Raoul de Gaucourt

Arms of Preuilly-sur-Claise, which preserves the memory of the Lords of Preuilly.

== See also ==
- Joan of Arc
- Raoul de Gaucourt
- Yolande of Aragon

== Bibliography ==
- Delacoux, Aloïs (1834). Biographie des sages-femmes célèbres, anciennes, modernes et contemporaines (in French). Paris: Trinquart. pp. 81–93.
- Hanotaux, Gabriel (1 May 1910). "Jeanne d'Arc". Revue des Deux Mondes (in French). LVII: 748.
