= Louis d'Orléans Showing Off His Mistress =

c. 1825 painting by Eugene Delacroix

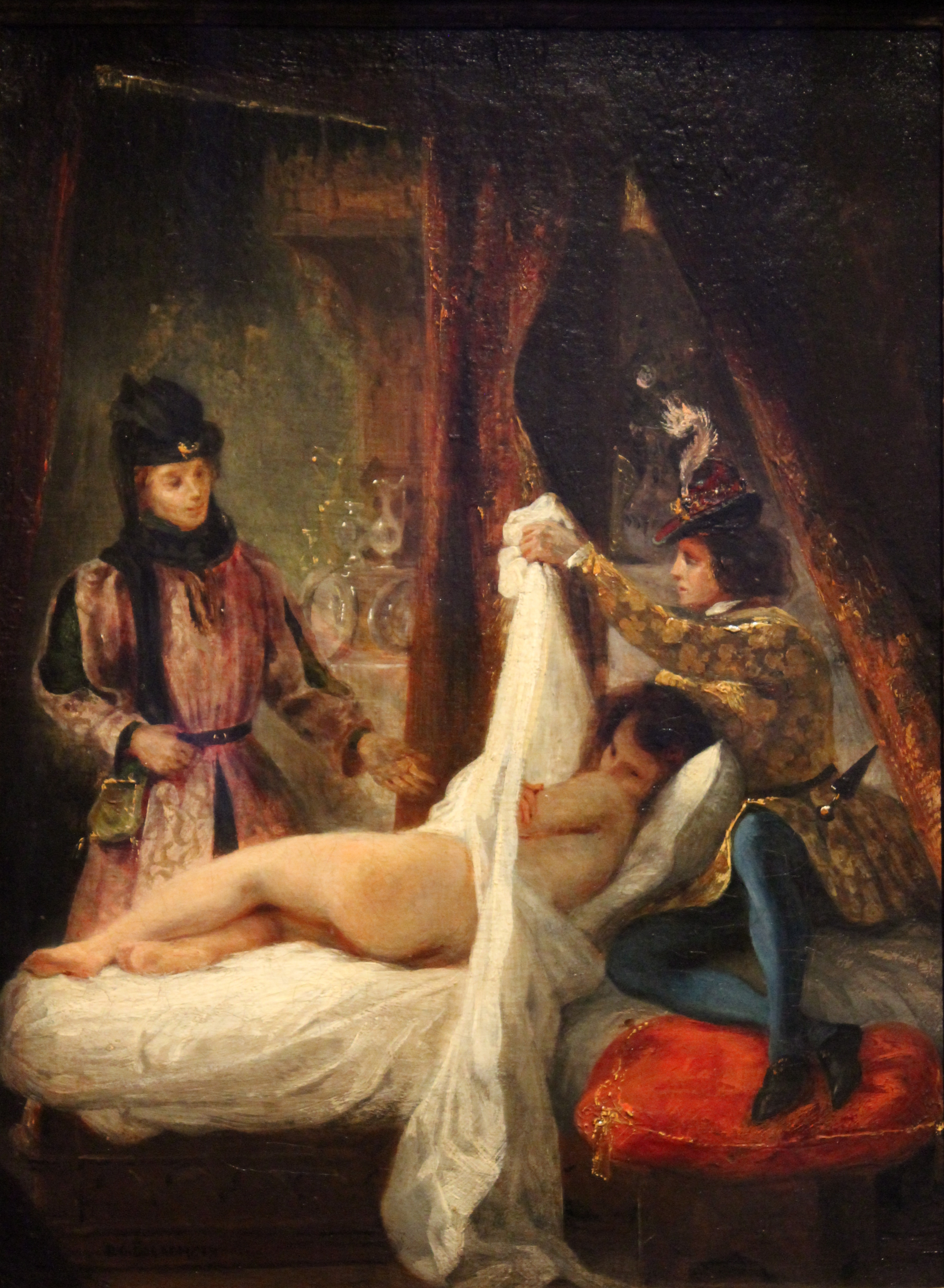
Louis d'Orléans Showing Off His Mistress (1825–1826) by Eugène Delacroix, 35.2 x 26.8 cm

Louis d'Orléans Showing Off His Mistress is an oil painting on canvas produced in 1825–1826 by the French artist Eugène Delacroix, now in the Thyssen-Bornemisza Museum in Madrid. It shows Louis I, Duke of Orléans, his chamberlain Albert Le Flamenc and Mariette d'Enghien, who was both Le Flamenc's wife and the Duke's mistress. The painting draws on an episode recounted in both Prosper de Barante's Histoire des ducs de Bourgogne de la maison de Valois and Brantôme's Vie des dames galantes. It shows strong influence from Rubens and Titian as well as from Richard Parkes Bonington, a British artist with whom he actively swapped ideas and sketches between 1825 and 1828.
