= Raoul de Gaucourt =

French soldier and statesman

Coat of arms of Raoul de Gaucourt

Raoul de Gaucourt, also known as the Sieur de Gaucort or Sire de Gaucourt (c. 1370–1461), was a French soldier and statesman. He fought at the Battle of Nicopolis in 1396 and the Siege of Harfleur in 1415, and spent 10 years as a prisoner in England. He was described by Juliet Barker in 2005 as "a medieval chivalric hero whom the modern world has forgotten".

== Early life and background ==
Born c. 1370, Gaucourt came from a noble family from Picardy. The family was loyal to the House of Armagnac, and Gaucourt had "strong personal connections" with Charles I, Duke of Orléans, Charles I d'Albret and Marshal Boucicaut.

== Military career ==
=== Early career ===
Gaucourt fought at the Battle of Nicopolis in 1396, and was knighted on that battlefield at the age of 26. He was captured and ransomed during the battle.

In 1400 Gaucourt was a founding member of Boucicaut's Order of the White Lady on a Green Shield.

In 1409 Gaucourt commanded a French army in Genoa, and captured Milan alongside Boucicaut.

During the Armagnac–Burgundian Civil War, in 1411, he was assigned to led the Armagnac forces capture the bridge of Saint-Cloud on behalf on Charles I, Duke of Orléans. He realized that a direct attack on the bridge would result in failure. Therefore, shortly before evening, he led 300 men on rafts and infiltrated the citadel using ropes, and released the drawbridge. The Burgundian garrison guarded the bridge was caught in surprise, and the fortress commander was still in bed with his wife when the attack happened. The Armagnacs captured Saint-Cloud before being retaken by an Anglo-Burgundian reinforcement of 8,800 men led by John the Fearless, Duke of Burgundy.

In 1412 he served as Chamberlain to Charles I, Duke of Orléans. He then served as captain of a number of Armagnac castles.

In 1415 he was a founding member of the Order of the Prisoner's Shackle.

=== Siege of Harfleur ===
Gaucourt was chosen by Charles I d'Albret and Marshal Boucicaut to help defend the town of Harfleur from the army of the English king Henry V in September 1415. Historian Juliet Barker said that they needed "an experienced and trustworthy knight to take charge of the defences".

Gaucourt, alongside Jean d'Estouteville, refused to surrender the town. When Henry's troops laid siege to the town, "de Gaucourt and his men fought back with a courage and determination that won the admiration of the English chaplain". Gaucourt oversaw the repair of defences in the town.

Gaucourt and members of the town council met with Henry on 17 September 1415. Gaucourt refused to surrender. However, the next day the town council offered to surrender on 22 September if the siege had not been broken by then. Gaucourt was unaware of this offer until he met again with Henry, but he and his fellow military commanders in the town (d'Estouteville and Guillaume de Léon) agreed to surrender.

Gaucourt and his troops had held out for 18 days, rather than the 8 that Henry had planned for; "Henry had underestimated the determination and ingenuity of de Gaucourt and his men". On 22 September Gaucourt presented the town's keys to Henry.

Gaucourt and 65 others were taken prisoner. Gaucourt was later released to carry a message to the Dauphin from Henry, challenging him to one-on-one combat to end the war. After doing so, Gaucourt "retreat[ed] to his sickbed", suffering from dysentery.

=== Later career and death ===
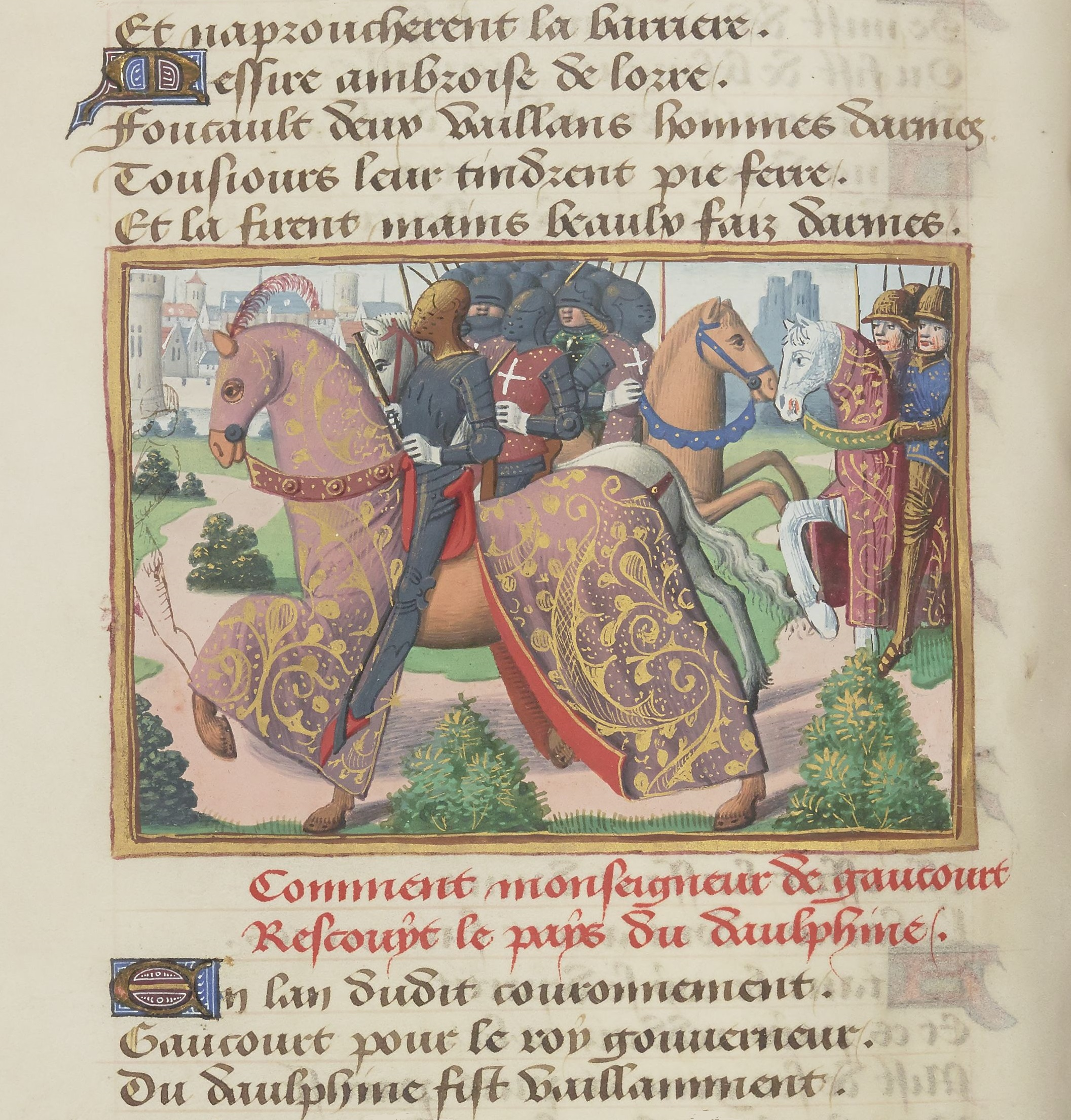
Campaign of Raoul de Gaucourt in Dauphiné, 1429, by Martial d'Auvergne

Following the French loss at the Battle of Agincourt, Gaucourt surrendered himself to Henry in Calais, and spent 10 years as a prisoner in England. He was released on licence in 1416 and again in 1417. In January 1417 he carried a secret message from Henry to the French king.

After his final release "he became a major figure in the reconquest of English-held lands in France", and "fought in every campaign against the English". This included fighting alongside Joan of Arc, including at the Siege of Orléans (1429).

Gaucourt died in 1461. He was in his late 80s or early 90s.

== Legacy ==
He was described by Barker as "a medieval chivalric hero whom the modern world has forgotten", and "one of the chief architects of the final expulsion of the English from France".

== Sources ==
- Barker, Juliet (2005). Agincourt : the King, the campaign, the battle. London: Little, Brown. ISBN 978-0-316-72648-1. OCLC 1244223711 – via Internet Archive.
