= Rouvray-Sainte-Croix =

- Commune
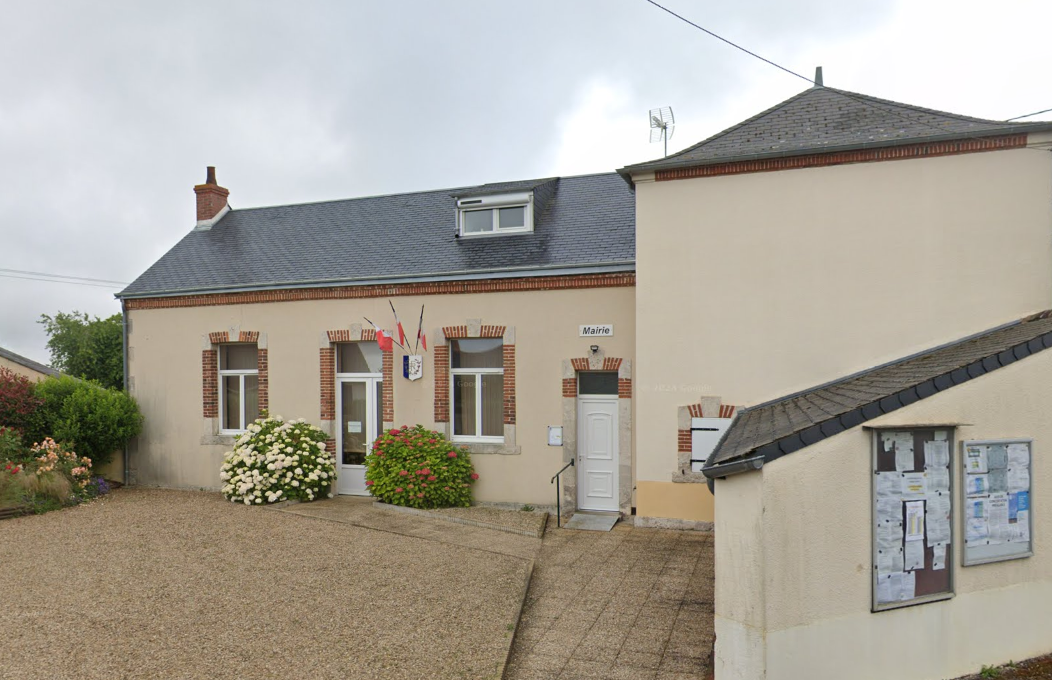
- Rouvray-Sainte-Croix Town hall
- Location of Rouvray-Sainte-Croix
- Location within France Location within Centre-Val de Loire
- Coordinates: 48°03′36″N 1°43′59″E
- Country: France
- Region: Centre-Val de Loire
- Department: Loiret
- Arrondissement: Orléans
- Canton: Meung-sur-Loire

Government
  - Mayor (2021–2026): Elodie Beucherie
- Area^{1}: 9.47 km^{2} (3.66 sq mi)
- Highest elevation: 133 m (436 ft)
- Lowest elevation: 119 m (390 ft)
- Population (2023): 135
  - Density: 14.3/km^{2} (36.9/sq mi)
- Time zone: UTC+01:00 (CET)
  - Summer (DST): UTC+02:00 (CEST)
- INSEE/Postal code: 45262 /45310
- ^{1} French Land Register data, which excludes lakes, ponds, glaciers > 1 km^{2} (0.386 sq mi or 247 acres) and river estuaries.

Rouvray-Sainte-Croix (French pronunciation: [ʁuvʁɛ sɛ̃t kʁwa]) is a commune in the Loiret department in north-central France.

It has long been thought that Rouvray-Saint-Denis was the site of the Battle of the Herrings in 1429, when Sir John Fastolf beat off an attack on an English convoy taking supplies to the siege of Orléans; but in his biography of Fastolf, The Real Falstaff, Stephen Cooper argues that the battle is more likely to have taken place at Rouvray-Sainte-Croix.

== See also ==
- Communes of the Loiret department
