= Battle of the Herrings =

1429 battle of the Hundred Years' War in Rouvray, France

Coordinates: 48°04′N 1°44′E

- Part of the Hundred Years' War (1415–53 phase)
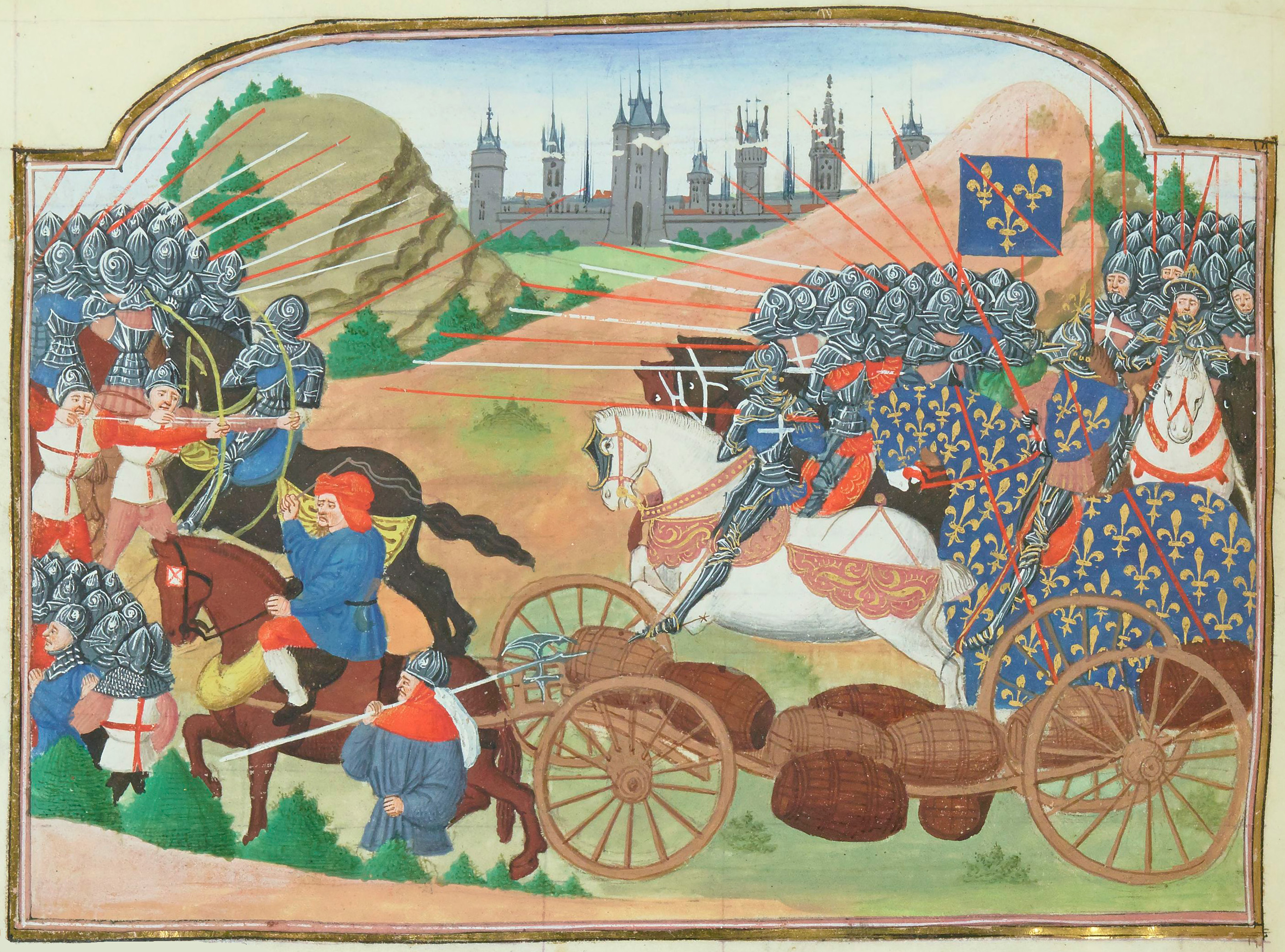
- Illumination adorning La Cronicque du temps de Tres Chrestien Roy Charles, septisme de ce nom, roy de France by Jean Chartier, c. 1470–1479
Date	12 February 1429
Location	Near Rouvray, France
Result	English victory

Belligerents
Kingdom of France; Kingdom of Scotland	Kingdom of England

Commanders and leaders
Charles de Bourbon; John Stewart †	John Fastolf; Simon Morhier

Strength
Around 4,000	1,600

Casualties and losses
500–600	Unknown but presumably light

The Battle of the Herrings, also called the Battle of Rouvray, was a military action near the town of Rouvray in France, just north of Orléans, which took place on 12 February 1429, during the siege of Orléans in the Hundred Years' War. The immediate cause of the battle was an attempt by French and Scottish forces, led by Charles of Bourbon and Sir John Stewart of Darnley, to intercept a supply convoy headed for the English army at Orléans. The English had been laying siege to the city since the previous October. This supply convoy was escorted by an English force under Sir John Fastolf and had been outfitted in Paris, from whence it had departed some time earlier. The battle was decisively won by the English.

According to Régine Pernoud, the supply train consisted of "some 300 carts and wagons, carrying crossbow shafts, cannons and cannonballs but also barrels of herring". The latter were being sent since the meatless Lenten days were approaching. It was the presence of this stock of fish which would give the somewhat unusual name to the battle.

== The battle ==
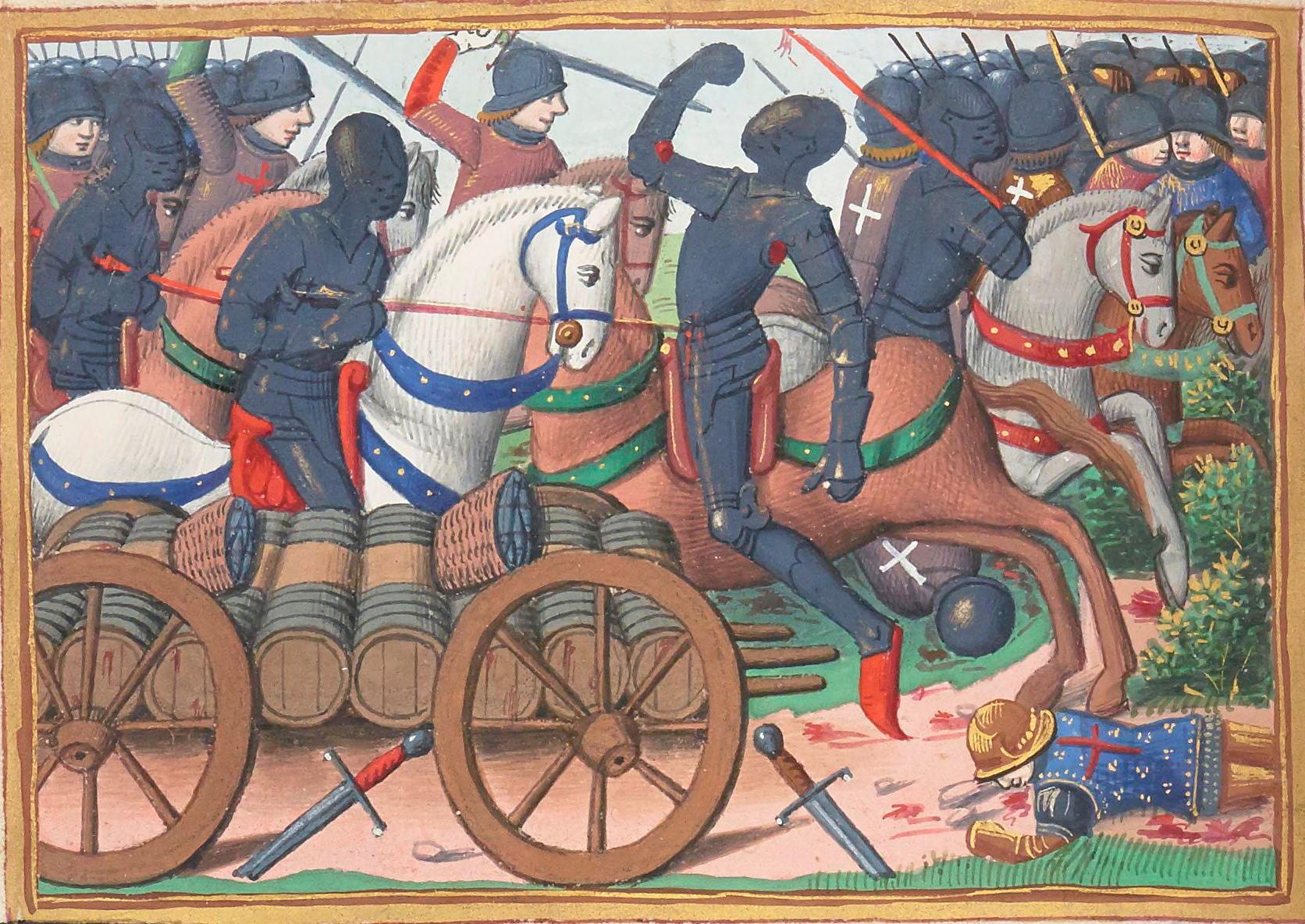
Journée des Harengs (from Les Vigiles de Charles VII by Martial d'Auvergne, written c. 1477–84, held by Bibliothèque Nationale, Paris)

The field of battle was an almost featureless, flat plain. The French army, numbering between 3,000 and 4,000, confronted the much smaller English force who had set up defensive positions by drawing up the supply wagons into a makeshift fortification. The entire defensive formation was then further protected by the placement of sharpened wooden stakes all around to prevent the French cavalry from charging, a tactic which had been employed with great success at Agincourt. The French attack began with a bombardment using gunpowder artillery, a relatively new weapon for the time and one whose proper usage was not well understood although it was damaging to the wagons and caused English casualties.

The 400-strong Scottish infantry, contrary to the orders of the Count of Clermont (Pernoud states that "Clermont sent message after message forbidding any attack") attacked the English position. According to deVries, this forced the premature cessation of the artillery bombardment out of fear of striking their own forces. The Scots were not well protected by armour, and great damage was visited upon them by the English archers and crossbowmen who were shooting from behind the protection of their wagon fort.

French cavalry went in to support the Scottish infantry but were stopped by the archers and stakes. At this point, the English, seeing that the French infantry were slow to join the Scots in the attack (Pernoud quotes the Journal du siege d'Orléans to the effect that the remaining French forces "came on in a cowardly fashion, and did not join up with the constable and the other foot soldiers"), decided to counterattack. They struck the rear and flanks of the disorganized French/Scottish forces and routed them.

The convoy reformed and proceeded to supply the besieging English force. The morale effect of the battle affected both sides.

There are two places called Rouvray in the region in question. In his biography of Sir John Fastolf, Stephen Cooper gives reasons the battle probably took place near Rouvray-Sainte-Croix, rather than Rouvray-Saint-Denis. Pernoud states that the combined French/Scottish forces lost about 400 men, including Stewart, the leader of the Scots. Among the wounded was Jean de Dunois, known also as the Bastard of Orléans, who barely escaped with his life and who would later play a crucial role, along with Joan of Arc, in the lifting of the siege of Orléans and the French Loire campaign which followed.

== Aftermath and significance ==
While it is generally felt today that the Battle of the Herrings was lost by the French because of the failure to continue the artillery bombardment to its full effect, such was not the view at the time, at least in the besieged city of Orléans. Within the city walls, as can be seen from the passage in the Journal du siege, the Count of Clermont was generally blamed for the disaster, being considered a coward and held in disdain. Soon thereafter, Clermont, together with the wounded Count Dunois, left Orléans together with about 2000 soldiers. Morale within the city and among its leaders was at a low point, so much so that consideration was given to surrendering the city.

The Battle of the Herrings was the most significant military action during the siege of Orléans from its inception in October 1428 until the appearance on the scene, in May of the following year, of Joan of Arc. Even so, it was, to all appearances, a rather minor engagement and, were it not for the context in which it occurred, would likely have been relegated to the merest of footnotes in military history or even forgotten altogether.

But not only was it part of one of the most famous siege actions in history, the story also gained currency that it played a pivotal role in convincing Robert de Baudricourt in Vaucouleurs, to accede to Joan's demand for support and safe conduct to Chinon. For it was on the very day (12 February 1429) of the battle that Joan met with de Baudricourt for the final time. According to the story, recounted in several places (for example, in Sackville-West), Joan gave out the information that "the Dauphin's arms had that day suffered a great reverse near Orléans". When, several days later, news of the military setback near Rouvray did in fact reach Vaucouleurs, de Baudricourt, according to the story, relented and agreed to sponsor her journey to the Dauphin in Chinon. Joan finally left Vaucouleurs for Chinon on 23 February 1429.

== In popular culture ==
Polish fantasy writer, Andrzej Sapkowski described the battle in his novel, Lux perpetua. The novel is part of the Hussite Trilogy, which takes place in 15th-century Silesia, during the Hussite Wars. The short description of the battle is not connected with the main plot. Sir John Fastolf is shown as a comical figure who wins the battle thanks to rumours he may have heard about the Bohemian heretics and their commander, Jan Žižka. Fastolf, feeling hopeless in the face of the enemy, forms his wagons into a wagenburg and surprisingly wins.

The Battle of the Herrings also appears as a vignette in Robert Nye's novel, Falstaff, told through the eyes of the English commander himself.

== See also ==
- Hundred Years' War
- John Fastolf
- English claims to the French throne
- Cod Wars
