= Barmainville =

- Part of Neuville Saint Denis
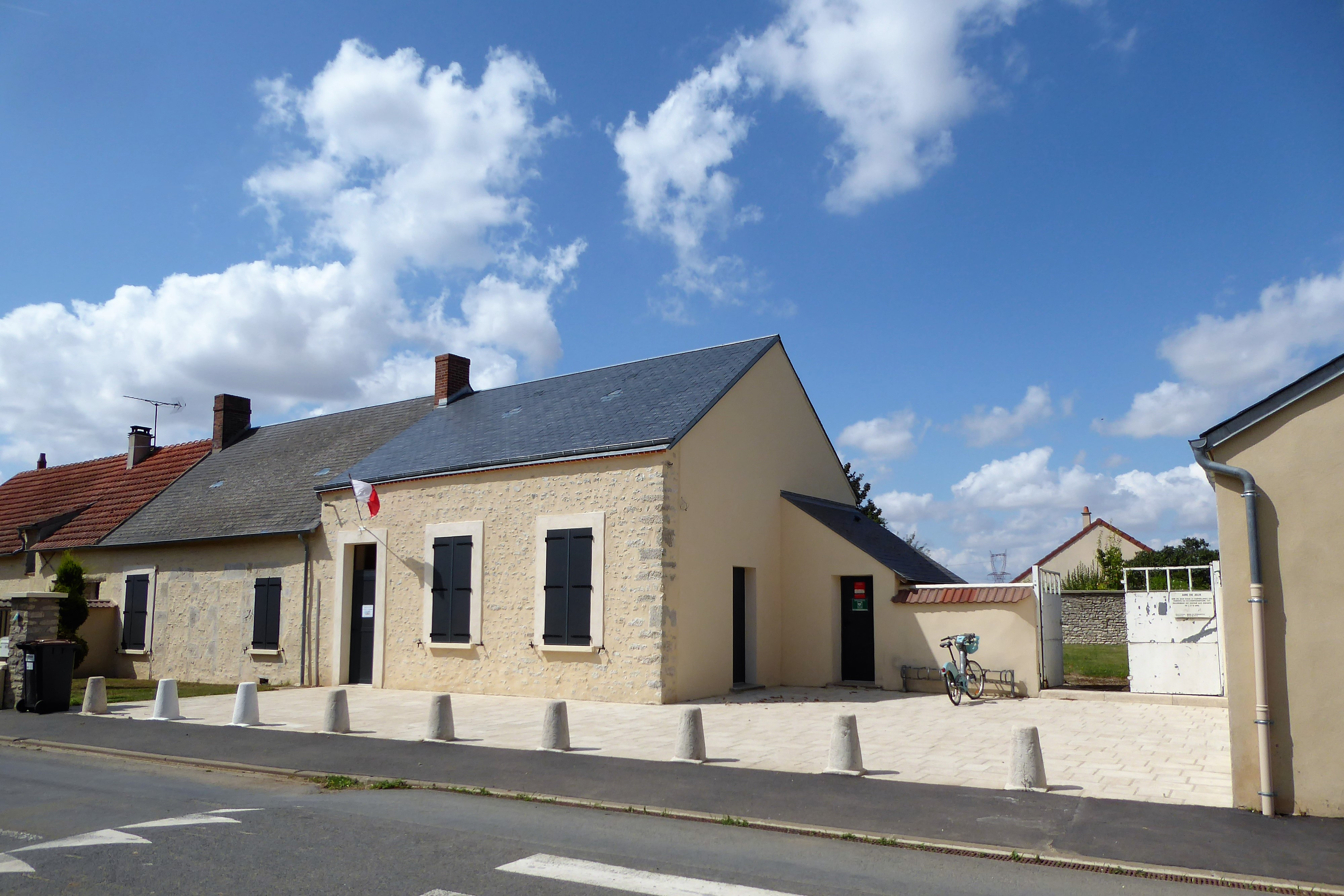
- Town hall
- Location of Barmainville
- Location within France Location within Centre-Val de Loire
- Coordinates: 48°15′14″N 1°56′56″E
- Country: France
- Region: Centre-Val de Loire
- Department: Eure-et-Loir
- Arrondissement: Chartres
- Canton: Les Villages Vovéens
- Commune: Neuville Saint Denis
- Area^{1}: 6.38 km^{2} (2.46 sq mi)
- Elevation: 136 m (446 ft)
- Highest elevation: 144 m (472 ft)
- Lowest elevation: 134 m (440 ft)
- Population (2023): 97
  - Density: 15/km^{2} (39/sq mi)
- Time zone: UTC+01:00 (CET)
  - Summer (DST): UTC+02:00 (CEST)
- Postal code: 28310
- ^{1} French Land Register data, which excludes lakes, ponds, glaciers > 1 km^{2} (0.386 sq mi or 247 acres) and river estuaries.

Barmainville (French pronunciation: [baʁmɛ̃vil]) is a former commune in the Eure-et-Loir department in northern France. It was merged into the new commune Neuville Saint Denis on 1 January 2025.

== See also ==
- Communes of the Eure-et-Loir department
