= Neuville Saint Denis =

- Commune
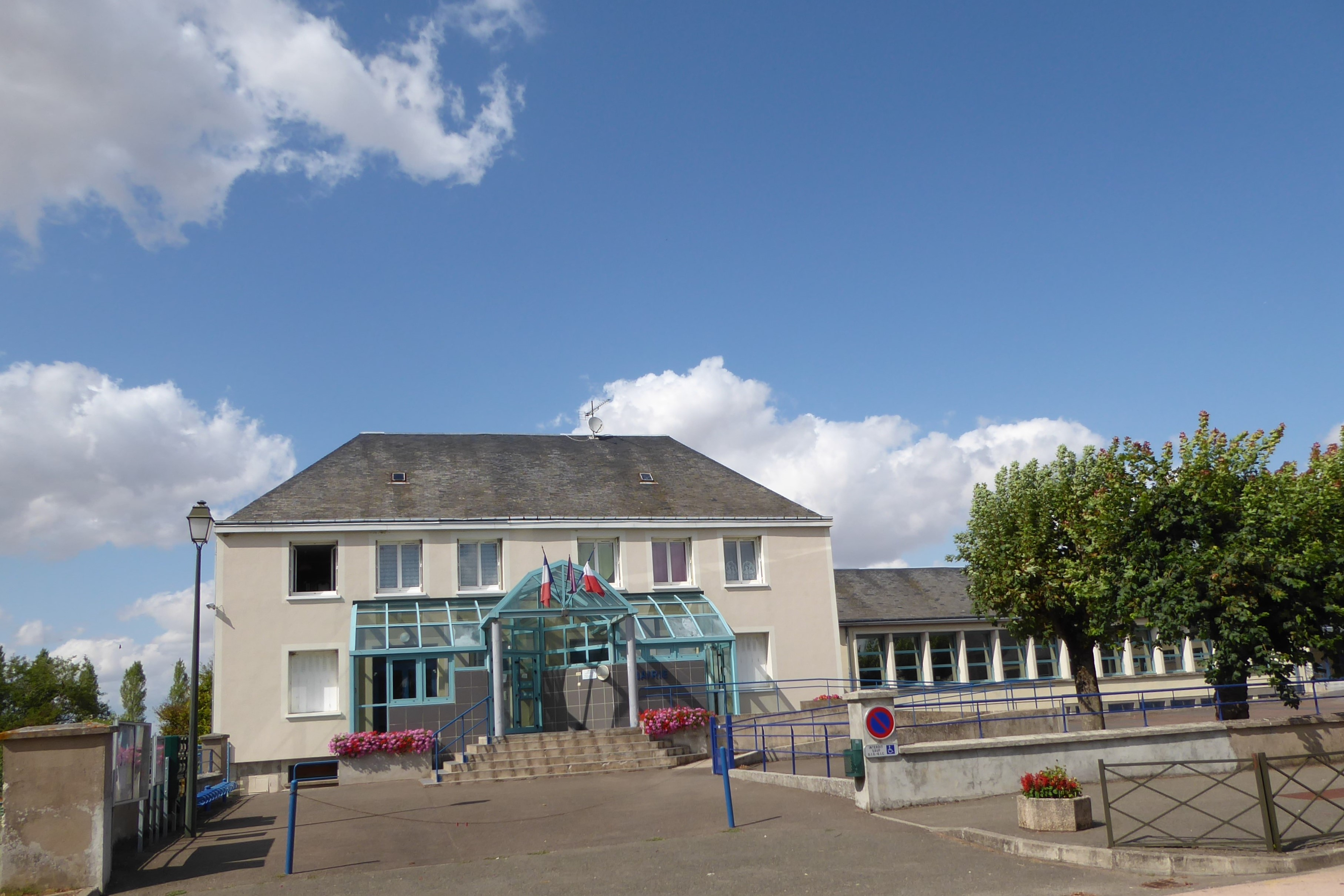
- Town hall in Rouvray-Saint-Denis
- Location of Neuville Saint Denis
- Location within France Location within Centre-Val de Loire
- Coordinates: 48°16′44″N 1°56′43″E
- Country: France
- Region: Centre-Val de Loire
- Department: Eure-et-Loir
- Arrondissement: Chartres
- Canton: Les Villages Vovéens
- Intercommunality: CC Cœur de Beauce

Government
  - Mayor (2025–2026): Alexandre Jaquemet
- Area^{1}: 41.41 km^{2} (15.99 sq mi)
- Highest elevation: 147 m (482 ft)
- Lowest elevation: 127 m (417 ft)
- Population (2023): 647
  - Density: 15.6/km^{2} (40.5/sq mi)
- Time zone: UTC+01:00 (CET)
  - Summer (DST): UTC+02:00 (CEST)
- INSEE/Postal code: 28319 /28310
- ^{1} French Land Register data, which excludes lakes, ponds, glaciers > 1 km^{2} (0.386 sq mi or 247 acres) and river estuaries.

Neuville Saint Denis (French pronunciation: [nøvil sɛ̃ dəni]) is a commune in the Eure-et-Loir department in northern France. It was formed on 1 January 2025, with the merger of Barmainville, Neuvy-en-Beauce and Rouvray-Saint-Denis.

== See also ==
- Communes of the Eure-et-Loir department
