= Siege of Harfleur =

Siege in 1415

- Part of the Hundred Years' War
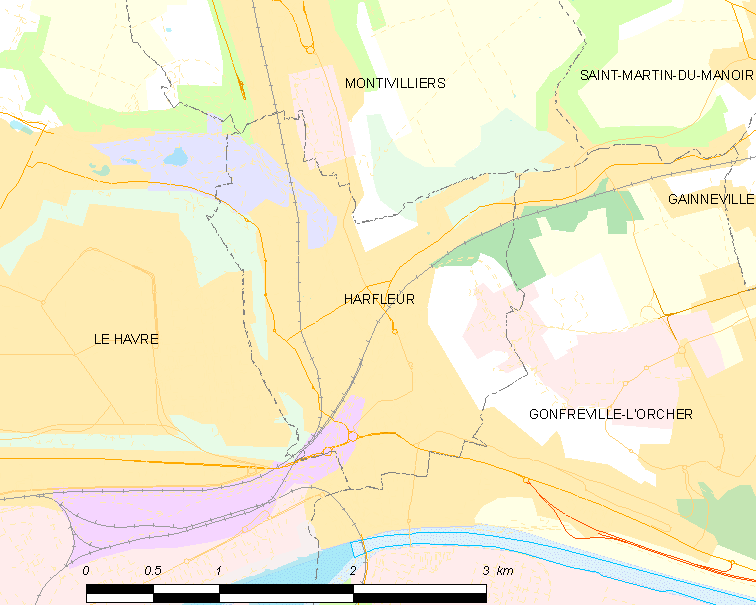
- Modern location diagram of Harfleur
Date	18 August – 22 September 1415
Location	Harfleur, Normandy, France 49°29′39″N 0°08′20″E
Result	English victory
Territorial changes	Harfleur annexed by England. Harfleur was later liberated by the French in 1436.

Belligerents
Kingdom of England	Kingdom of France

Commanders and leaders
Henry V Thomas of Lancaster, Duke of Clarence	Jean d'Estouteville; Raoul de Gaucourt

Strength
11,300	Garrison: 100; Reinforcements: 300

Casualties and losses
Fatal: c. 2,000–5,000; Illness: c. 2,200	140 c. 2,000 refugees
- Harfleur, a commune in the Seine-Maritime department, Normandy region, northern France

The siege of Harfleur (18 August – 22 September 1415) was conducted by the English army of King Henry V in Normandy, France, during the Hundred Years' War. The defenders of Harfleur surrendered to the English on terms and were treated as prisoners of war. It was the first time that an English army made significant use of gunpowder artillery in the siege of a large urban settlement.

The English army was considerably reduced by casualties and an outbreak of dysentery during the siege but marched towards Calais, leaving a garrison behind at the port. The English were intercepted en route and fought the Battle of Agincourt (25 October), inflicting a huge defeat on the French.

== Background ==
Henry V of England invaded France following the failure of negotiations with the French. He claimed the title of King of France through his great-grandfather Edward III, although in practice the English kings were generally prepared to renounce this claim if the French would acknowledge the English claim on Aquitaine and other French lands (the terms of the Treaty of Brétigny). He initially called a great council in the spring of 1414 to discuss going to war with France, but the lords insisted that he should negotiate further and moderate his claims. In the following negotiations Henry said that he would give up his claim to the French throne if the French would pay the 1.6 million crowns outstanding from the ransom of John II (who had been captured at the Battle of Poitiers in 1356), and concede English ownership of the lands of Normandy, Touraine, Anjou, Brittany and Flanders, as well as Aquitaine. Henry would marry Princess Catherine, the young daughter of Charles VI, and receive a dowry of 2 million crowns. The French responded with what they considered the generous terms of marriage with Princess Catherine, a dowry of 600,000 crowns, and an enlarged Aquitaine. By 1415 negotiations had ground to a halt, with the English claiming that the French had mocked their claims and ridiculed Henry himself. In December 1414, the English Parliament was persuaded to grant Henry a "double subsidy", a tax at twice the traditional rate, to recover his inheritance from the French. On 19 April 1415, Henry again asked the great council to sanction war with France, and this time they agreed.

== Invasion and preparation ==
On Tuesday 13 August 1415, Henry landed at Chef-en-Caux in the Seine estuary. Then he attacked Harfleur with at least 2,300 men-at-arms and 9,000 bowmen. The French garrison of 100 men was reinforced by two experienced knights, the Sieur d'Estouteville and the Sieur de Gaucourt, who arrived with a further 300 men-at-arms and took command.

== Investment and siege ==
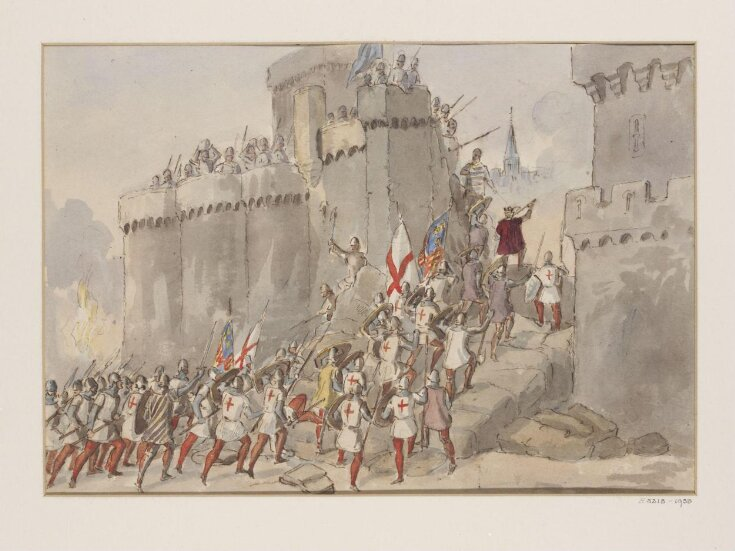
The Siege of Harfleur by Thomas Grieve, 1859.

On 18 August, Thomas of Lancaster, Duke of Clarence, led part of the army to set up camp on the far east side of the town. This meant that the town was invested and a French relief convoy, bearing supplies of guns, powder, arrows, and crossbows, was captured. Details of the siege are not well known but seem to have followed the standard pattern of siege warfare in the Late Middle Ages. After the walls had been seriously damaged by the twelve great guns and other traditional artillery of the English siege train, Henry planned a general assault one month to the day that the town had been enveloped. But the town's commanders asked for a parley and terms were agreed that if the French army did not arrive before 23 September, the town would surrender to the English. Harfleur yielded to the invaders on 22 September. The knights were released on parole to gather ransom, and those townspeople who were prepared to swear allegiance to Henry were allowed to remain, while the rest were ordered to depart.

== Aftermath ==
Henry left a garrison of 300 men-at-arms and 900 archers in the town. On Monday 8 October the English army set out for Calais. Henry searched for an undefended or weakly defended bridge or ford on the Somme river, hoping to slip past the French army unnoticed, but although he crossed the Somme he failed to evade the French army and was forced to fight the battle of Agincourt.

=== Casualties ===
During the siege, the English army suffered from dysentery (known as the bloody flux) which continued to affect them after the siege ended. Contemporary sources suggest that Henry V lost up to 5,000 men at Harfleur, principally to disease. Anne Curry, drawing information from existing sick lists, identifies 1,330 men who were invalided home and another 36 who died during the siege. She believes these numbers represent a close maximum of English casualties and estimated that the English numbered around 9,000 at Agincourt. Several historians criticised her methodology and preferred to maintain the higher casualty rates, pointing out that existing records are incomplete and that they are not reliable ways to estimate total troop numbers. Clifford J. Rogers considers the number of 36 deaths to be impossibly low and finds the higher contemporary figures believable, citing other historical examples of armies being heavily hit by dysentery. In the second edition of his volume "Cursed Kings...." (2016) Jonathan Sumption wrote that less the Harfleur garrison, the English army numbered 900 men-at-arms and 5,000 archers when the march began.

== In popular culture ==
As it forms a crucial episode in William Shakespeare's play, Henry V, the siege is portrayed in all cinematic adaptations, including the 1944 film by Laurence Olivier, the 1989 film by Kenneth Branagh, the 2012 television film, as well as the 2019 film by David Michôd. It is also fictionally portrayed in the historical novel Azincourt (2008) by Bernard Cornwell as well as the children's novel My Story: A Hail of Arrows (2009) by Michael Cox, and the Danish novel The Highest Honour (2009) by Susanne Clod Pedersen.
