= Jean de Dunois =

15th-century French noble (1402–1468)

- Count of Dunois; Count of Longueville
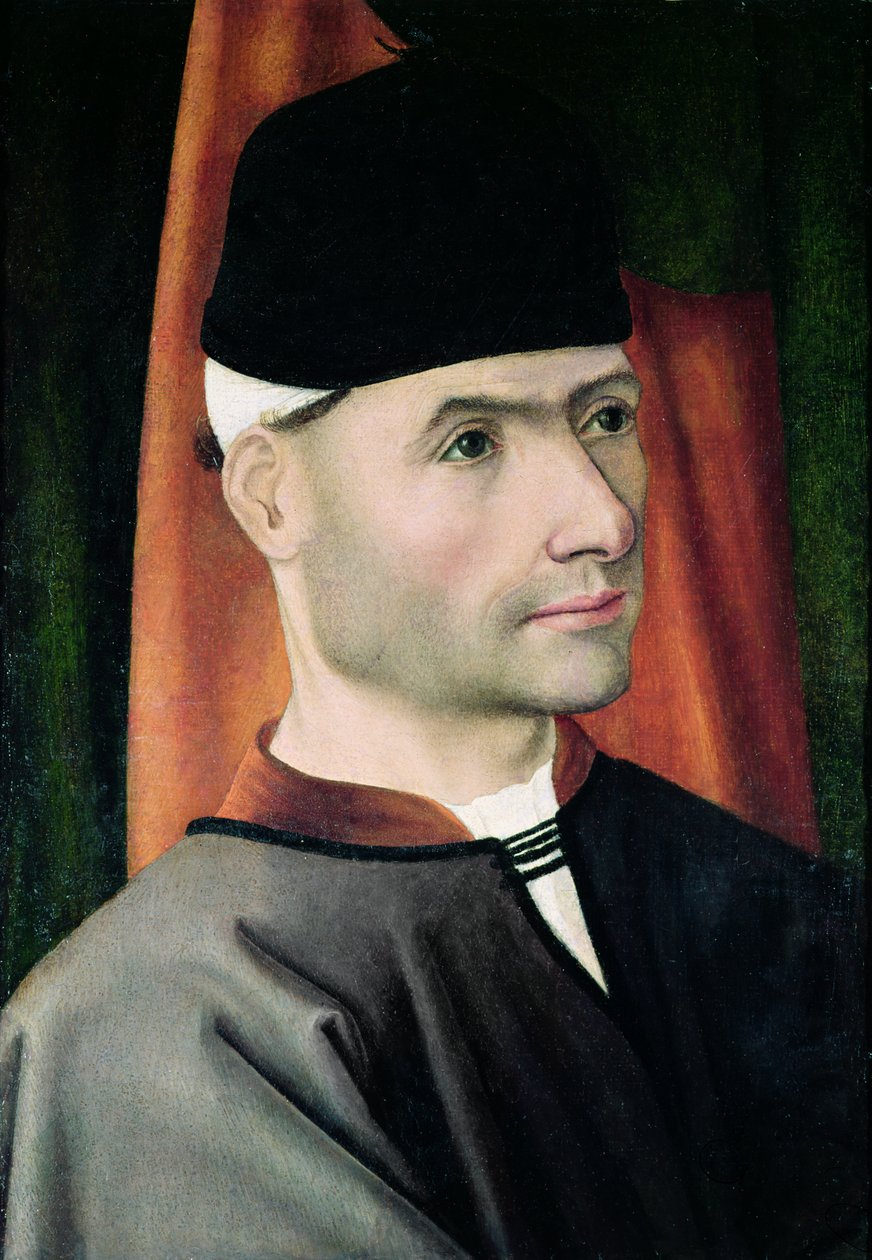
- Portrait of the Bastard of Orléans, 15th century
- Born: 23 November 1402; France
- Died: 24 November 1468 (aged 66)
- Spouse: Marie Louvet (m. 1422; died 1426) Marie of Harcourt (m. 1439; died 1464)
- Issue Among others…: François Ι d'Orléans-Longueville
- Father: Louis I, Duke of Orléans
- Mother: Mariette d'Enghien
- Military career
- Branch: French Army
- Conflicts: Hundred Years' War; Siege of Montargis; Battle of the Herrings; Loire Campaign; Siege of Orléans; Battle of Jargeau; War of the Public Weal

Coat of arms of the Counts of Longueville

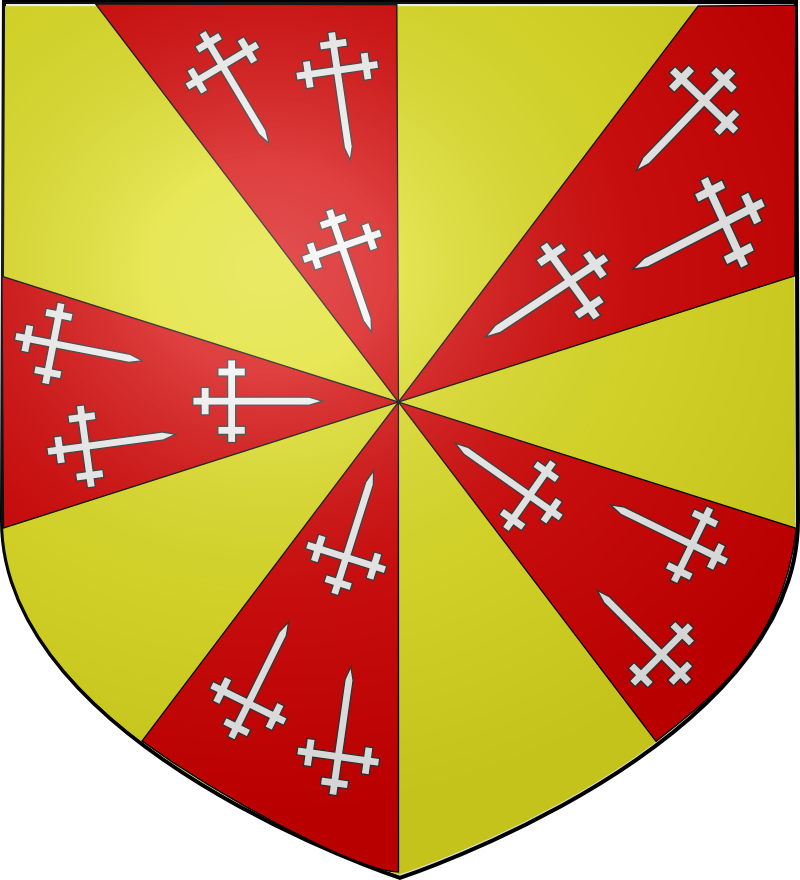
Coat of arms of the d'Enghien family

Jean d'Orléans, Count of Dunois (23 November 1402 – 24 November 1468), known as the "Bastard of Orléans" (French: bâtard d'Orléans) or simply Jean de Dunois, was a French military leader during the Hundred Years' War who participated in military campaigns with Joan of Arc. His nickname, the "Bastard of Orléans", was a mark of his high status, since it acknowledged him as a first cousin to the king and acting head of a cadet branch of the royal family during his half-brother's captivity. In 1439 he received the county of Dunois from his half-brother Charles I, Duke of Orléans, and later King Charles VII made him count of Longueville.

== Life ==
Jean was the illegitimate son of Louis I, Duke of Orléans – son of King Charles V of France – and his mistress Mariette d'Enghien. In 1407, Jean's father was assassinated. Eight years later, his half-brother, Charles, Duke of Orléans was captured at the Battle of Agincourt. He remained a prisoner of the English for twenty-five years. This left Jean the only adult male to represent the house of Orléans. He was Knight of the Order of the Porcupine.

Jean took part in the civil war in France during the reign of King Charles VI on the side of the Armagnacs, and was captured by the Burgundians in 1418 in Paris during the Burgundian coup d'état of the city. Released in 1420, he entered the service of the Dauphin Charles, fighting in the Hundred Years' War against English forces. In 1427, Jean, along with Arthur of Richemont and Etienne of Vignolles, forced the Earl of Warwick to raise his siege of Montargis. He was wounded, the next year, at the battle of Rouvray. Jean led the French defenses at the siege of Orléans, and together with Joan of Arc relieved the siege. He joined her on the campaigns of 1429 and remained active after her death.

Jean attended Charles VII's coronation in July 1429 and in 1436 aided in the recapture of Paris. In 1439 he was made Count of Dunois. He was prominent in the conquest of Guienne and Normandy in the final years of the Hundred Years War.

Jean participated in the Praguerie revolt against Charles VII and was a leader of the League of the Public Weal against King Louis XI in 1465, but each time he regained favor at court.

He is a significant character in George Bernard Shaw's play Saint Joan.

== Marriages and progeny ==
He married Marie Louvet (d. 1426) in April 1422 at Bourges, by whom he had no children.

He married a second time to Marie of Harcourt (d. 1464), Lady of Parthenay 26 October 1439 and had four children:

1. Jean (1443–1453)
2. François Ι d'Orléans-Longueville (1447–1491), Count of Dunois, Tancarville, Longueville, and Montgomery, married 2 July 1466 to Agnès of Savoy (1445–1508). One of their children was Louis I d'Orléans, duc de Longueville.
3. Marie (1440–1499), married 1466 to Louis de la Haye, Lord of Passavant and Mortagne.
4. Catherine d'Orléans (1449–1501), married 14 May 1468 to Johann VII of Saarbrücken-Commercy (1430–1492), Count of Roucy without issue.

== Titles ==
- Lord of Valbonais (1421–1468)
- Count of Mortain (1424–1425)
- Viscount of Saint-Sauveur
- Count of Périgord (1430–1439)
- Count of Dunois (1439–1468)
- Count of Longueville (1443–1468)

== Sources ==
- Emery, Anthony (2016). Seats of Power in Europe during the Hundred Years War. Oxbow Books.
- Gillerman, Dorothy W. (1994). Enguerran De Marigny and the Church of Notre-Dame at Ecouis: Art and Patronage in the Reign of Philip the Fair. Pennsylvania University Press.
- Grummitt, David (2010). "Jean, Count of Dunois". In Rogers, Clifford J. (ed.). The Oxford Encyclopedia of Medieval Warfare and Military Technology. Oxford University Press. pp. 550–551.
- Potter, David (1995). A History of France, 1460-1560: The Emergence of a Nation State. St. Martin's Press.
- Sowerby, Tracey A.; Hennings, Jan, eds. (2017). Practices of Diplomacy in the Early Modern World C.1410-1800. Routledge.
- Vale, Malcolm Graham Allan (1974). Charles VI. University of California Press.

French nobility
New creation	Count of Mortain; 1424 – 1425	to royal domain
New creation	Count of Dunois; 1439 – 1468	Succeeded by Francis II
New creation	Count of Longueville; 1443 – 1468	Succeeded by Francis II
Preceded by ?	Count of Périgord ?-?	Succeeded by ?
Preceded by ?	Viscount of Saint-Sauveur ?-?	Succeeded by ?
Preceded by ?	Lord of Valbonais ?-?	Succeeded by ?
