= Janville-en-Beauce =

French commune

- Commune
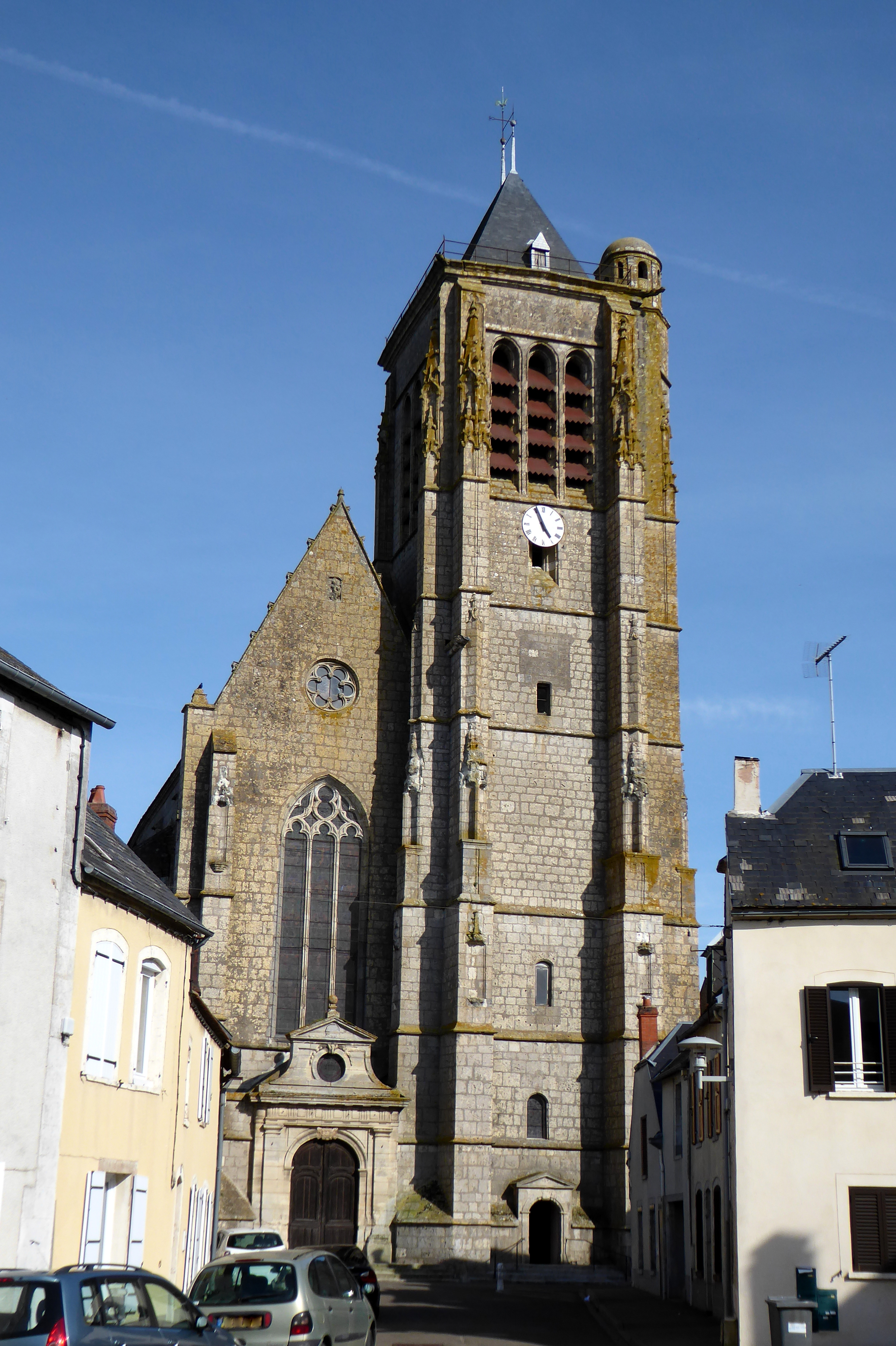
- The church in Janville
- Location of Janville-en-Beauce
- Location within France Location within Centre-Val de Loire
- Coordinates: 48°12′05″N 1°52′59″E
- Country: France
- Region: Centre-Val de Loire
- Department: Eure-et-Loir
- Arrondissement: Chartres
- Canton: Les Villages Vovéens
- Intercommunality: Cœur de Beauce

Government
  - Mayor (2020–2026): Stéphane Maguet
- Area^{1}: 42.32 km^{2} (16.34 sq mi)
- Highest elevation: 150 m (490 ft)
- Lowest elevation: 124 m (407 ft)
- Population (2023): 2,464
  - Density: 58.22/km^{2} (150.8/sq mi)
- Time zone: UTC+01:00 (CET)
  - Summer (DST): UTC+02:00 (CEST)
- INSEE/Postal code: 28199 /28310
- ^{1} French Land Register data, which excludes lakes, ponds, glaciers > 1 km^{2} (0.386 sq mi or 247 acres) and river estuaries.

Janville-en-Beauce (French pronunciation: [ʒɑ̃vil ɑ̃ bos], literally Janville in Beauce) is a commune in the Eure-et-Loir department in northern France. It was established on 1 January 2019 by merging the former communes of Janville (the seat), Allaines-Mervilliers and Le Puiset.

== Population ==
Population data refer to the commune in its geography as of January 2025.

Historical population
Year	Pop.	±% p.a.
1968	2,303	—
1975	2,215	−0.56%
1982	2,326	+0.70%
1990	2,351	+0.13%
1999	2,342	−0.04%
2007	2,524	+0.94%
2012	2,539	+0.12%
2017	2,567	+0.22%
2023	2,464	−0.68%
Source: INSEE

== See also ==
- Communes of the Eure-et-Loir department
