= Allaines-Mervilliers =

- Part of Janville-en-Beauce
- Location of Allaines-Mervilliers
- Location within France Location within Centre-Val de Loire
- Coordinates: 48°12′18″N 1°49′30″E
- Country: France
- Region: Centre-Val de Loire
- Department: Eure-et-Loir
- Arrondissement: Chartres
- Canton: Voves
- Commune: Janville-en-Beauce
- Area^{1}: 22.22 km^{2} (8.58 sq mi)
- Elevation: 136 m (446 ft)
- Highest elevation: 142 m (466 ft)
- Lowest elevation: 124 m (407 ft)
- Population (2021): 246
  - Density: 11.1/km^{2} (28.7/sq mi)
- Time zone: UTC+01:00 (CET)
  - Summer (DST): UTC+02:00 (CEST)
- Postal code: 28310
- ^{1} French Land Register data, which excludes lakes, ponds, glaciers > 1 km^{2} (0.386 sq mi or 247 acres) and river estuaries.

Allaines-Mervilliers (French pronunciation: [alɛn mɛʁvilje]) is a former commune in the Eure-et-Loir department in northern France. It was created in 1973 by the merger of two former communes: Allaines and Mervilliers. On 1 January 2019, it was merged into the new commune of Janville-en-Beauce.

== Population ==
Historical population
Year	Pop.	±% p.a.
2006	341	—
2011	332	−0.53%
2015	318	−1.07%
2021	246	−4.19%
Source: INSEE

== See also ==
- Communes of the Eure-et-Loir department
