= Mariette d'Enghien =

French noble, active 1402

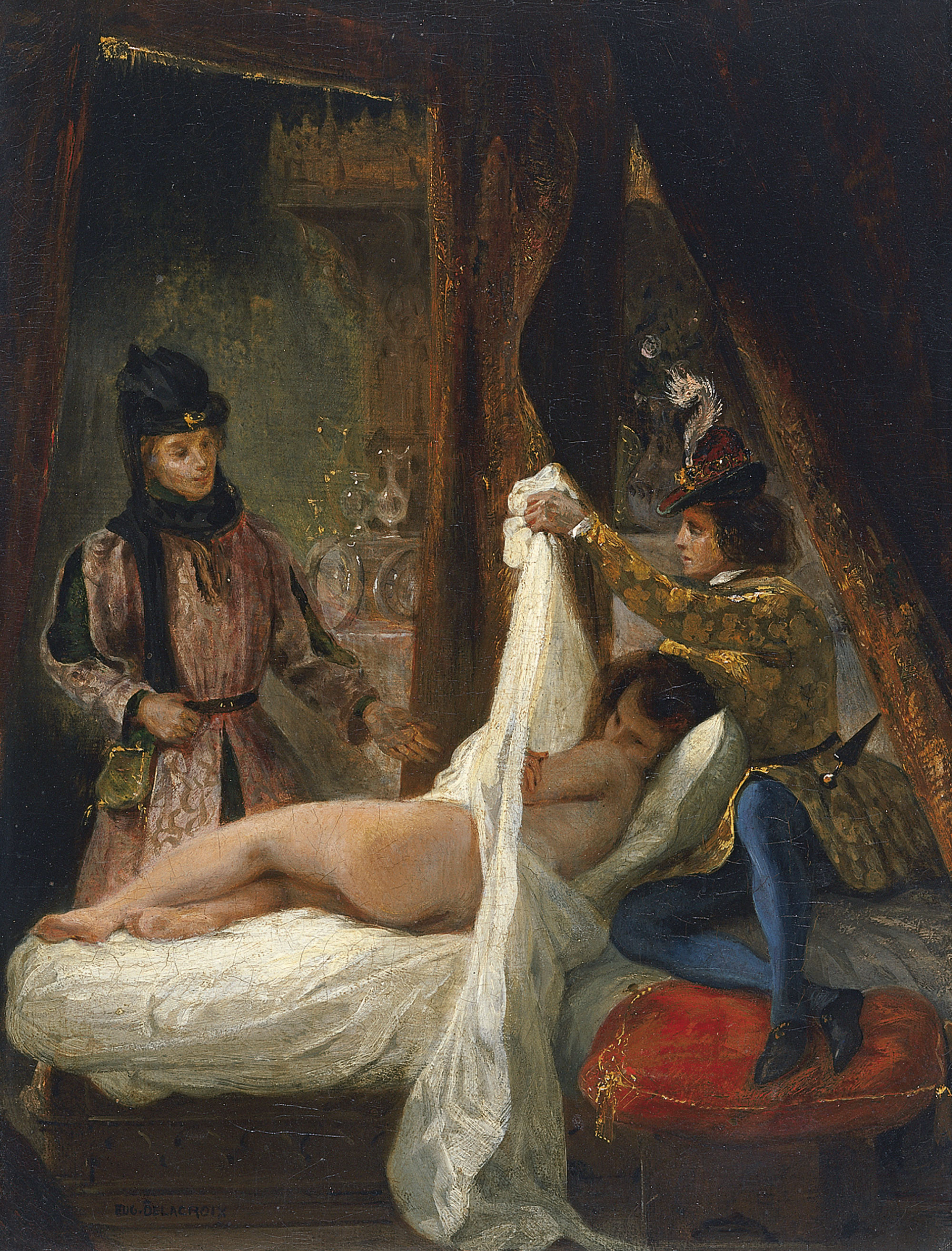
- The Duke of Orléans showing his Lover by Eugène Delacroix (1825)
- Years active: 1402
- Born: Yolande d'Enghien
- Died: Claix, Isère, France

Mariette d'Enghien (French: [maʁjɛt dɑ̃ɡɛ̃]; born Yolande d'Enghien; fl. 1402), was a French aristocrat, noblewoman, and the mistress of the French prince Louis I, Duke of Orléans, brother of King Charles VI.

== Biography ==
Yolande d'Enghien was the daughter of Jacques d'Enghien, Castellan of Mons, by his first wife, Marie de Roucy de Pierrepont. She was known as the Lady of Wiège and Fagnoles, lands she violently seized from her uncle and grandfather. In 1389, she married Aubert Le Flamenc, Lord of Cany and Chamberlain to the king, Charles VI of France.

Mariette d'Enghien became the mistress of Louis I, Duke of Orléans, brother of King Charles VI. Their son, Jean de Dunois, was born in 1402 and became the comrade in arms of Joan of Arc. She died at Claix, Isère.

== Popular culture ==
She is a character in the novel In a Dark Wood Wandering by Hella S. Haasse.
