= Siege of Montargis =

1427 siege during the Hundred Years' War

- Part of the Hundred Years' War
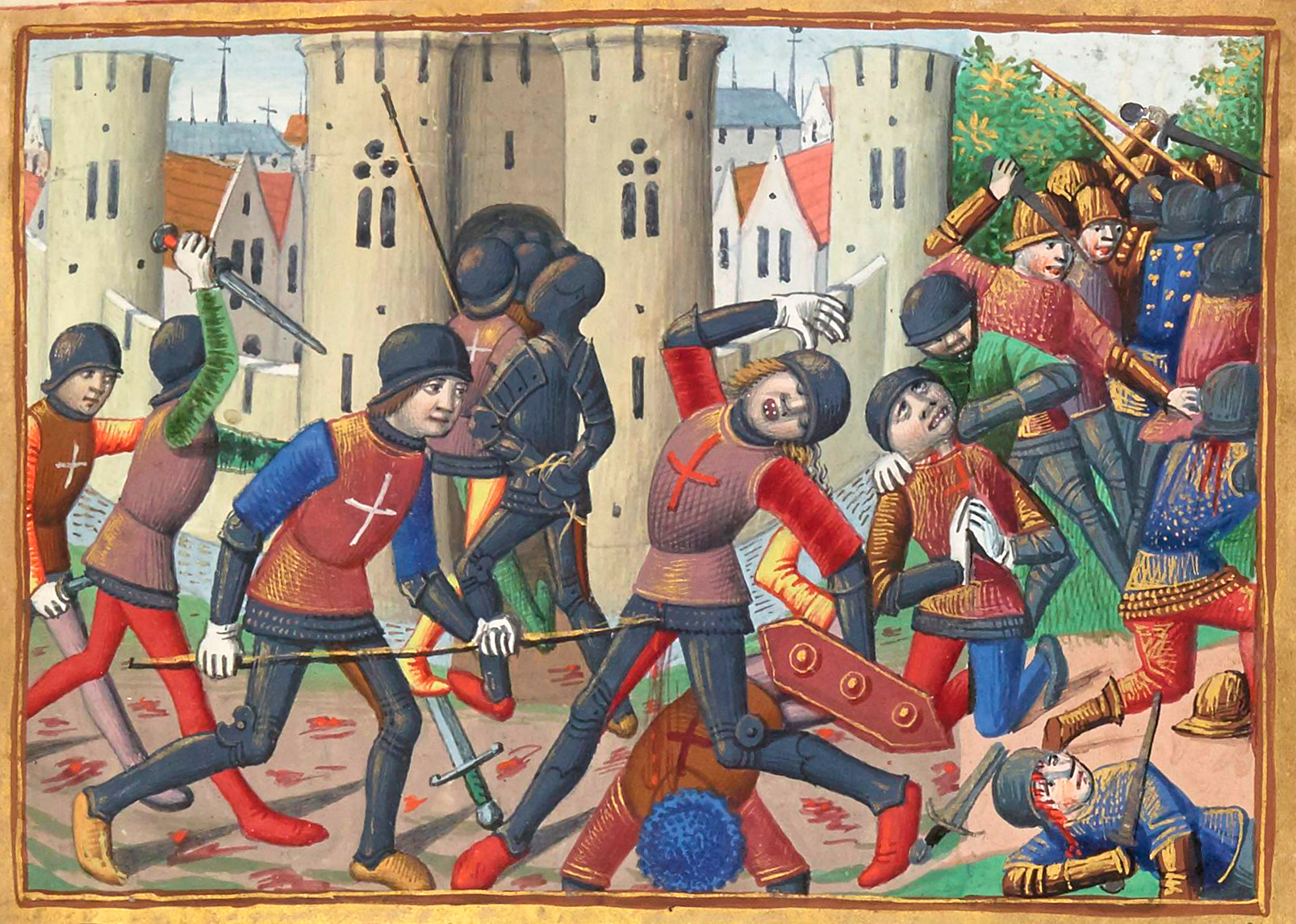
- The Siege of Montargis, illustration of the manuscript of Martial d'Auvergne, Les Vigiles de Charles VII, Paris, BnF, circa 1484.
Date	15 July – 5 September 1427 (1 month and 3 weeks)
Location	Montargis, Centre-Val de Loire, France 47.9978°N 2.7333°E
Result	French victory

Belligerents
France	England

Commanders and leaders
Jean de Dunois; La Hire	Earl of Warwick

Strength
Garrison; Relief army: 1,600	3,000 men Artillery

Casualties and losses
Unknown	1,000 men Artillery and baggage

The siege of Montargis (15 July – 5 September 1427) took place during the Hundred Years War. A French relief army under Jean de Dunois routed an English force led by the Earl of Warwick.

== Prelude ==
In June 1427, John of Lancaster, Duke of Bedford ordered Richard Beauchamp, Earl of Warwick to capture the French stronghold of Montargis, situated on high ground between the Loing and Vernisson rivers, crisscrossed by canals and held by a sizeable and well-supplied garrison. Warwick led a force of 3,000 men supported by artillery and laid siege to the place on 15 July 1427.

== Siege ==
Despite a constant artillery bombardment, the English made little progress by early September. Dauphin Charles sent a relief force of 1,600 men under the command of Jean de Dunois and La Hire. Dunois informed the garrison of his arrival and laid out a battle plan. Dunois' force appeared south of town, and as the English tried to attack them across a wooden bridge, Montargis' defenders opened the town's sluice gates, sweeping away the bridge and cutting the English army in two. The garrison and Dunois attacked the English from both sides and Warwick's army lost one third of its troops and all of its artillery and baggage as it fled.

== Aftermath ==
The victory was a major boost for French morale and advanced the military fame of Dunois.
