= Juliet Barker =

English historian

- Born: 1958 (age 67–68); Yorkshire, England
- Occupation: Historian
- Writing career
- Subjects: William Wordsworth; Brontës; Medieval warfare Medieval tournaments Peasants' Revolt

Juliet R. V. Barker FRSL (born 1958) is an English historian, specialising in the Middle Ages and literary biography. She is the author of works on the Brontës, William Wordsworth, and medieval tournaments. From 1983 to 1989 she was the curator and librarian of the Bronte Parsonage Museum.

Barker was educated at Bradford Girls' Grammar School and St Anne's College, Oxford, where she gained her doctorate in medieval history.

== Selected works ==
- Brontës: Selected Poems (1978) Everyman Poetry, editor
- The Tournament in England: 1100–1400 (1986) Woodbridge, England:The Boydell Press, ISBN 0-85115-942-7
- The Brontë Yearbook (1990) editor
- The Brontës (1994)
- Charlotte Brontë: Juvenilia 1829–35 (1996) editor
- The Brontës: A Life in Letters (1997)
- Wordsworth: A Life (2000)
- Wordsworth: A Life in Letters (2002)
- Agincourt: The King, the Campaign, the Battle (2005), UK: Little, Brown ISBN 0-349-11918-X
- The Deafening Sound of Silent Tears: The Story of Caring For Life (2007)
- Conquest: The English Kingdom of France 1417-50 (2009) London: Little, Brown
- England Arise: The People, the King and the Great Revolt of 1381 (2014)
- Drops into an Ocean: Continuing the story of Caring For Life (2017)

=== Collaborations ===
- with Richard Barber: Tournaments: Jousts, Chivalry and Pageants in the Middle Ages (1989)The Boydell Press, ISBN 0-85115-470-0

== Honours and awards ==
In 1999 she was awarded an honorary Doctorate of Letters by the University of Bradford. She is a Fellow of the Royal Society of Literature.

The Brontës won the Yorkshire Post Book Award and was short-listed for both the AT&T Non-Fiction Prize and the Marsh Biography Award.
