= Janville, Eure-et-Loir =

Janville
- Part of Janville-en-Beauce
- Coat of arms
- Location of Janville
- Location within France Location within Centre-Val de Loire
- Coordinates: 48°12′05″N 1°52′59″E
- Country: France
- Region: Centre-Val de Loire
- Department: Eure-et-Loir
- Arrondissement: Chartres
- Canton: Voves
- Commune: Janville-en-Beauce
- Area^{1}: 12.19 km^{2} (4.71 sq mi)
- Elevation: 136 m (446 ft)
- Highest elevation: 140 m (460 ft)
- Lowest elevation: 127 m (417 ft)
- Population (2022): 1,854
  - Density: 152.1/km^{2} (393.9/sq mi)
- Time zone: UTC+01:00 (CET)
  - Summer (DST): UTC+02:00 (CEST)
- Postal code: 28310
- ^{1} French Land Register data, which excludes lakes, ponds, glaciers > 1 km^{2} (0.386 sq mi or 247 acres) and river estuaries.

Janville (French pronunciation: [ʒɑ̃vil]) is a former commune in the Eure-et-Loir department in northern France. On 1 January 2019, it was merged into the new commune Janville-en-Beauce.

== Population ==
Historical population
Year	Pop.	±% p.a.
1962	1,339	—
1968	1,533	+2.28%
1975	1,542	+0.08%
1982	1,672	+1.16%
1990	1,747	+0.55%
1999	1,697	−0.32%
2006	1,778	+0.67%
2022	1,854	+0.26%
Source: EHESS and INSEE

== See also ==
- Communes of the Eure-et-Loir department
