= Le Puiset =

- Part of Janville-en-Beauce
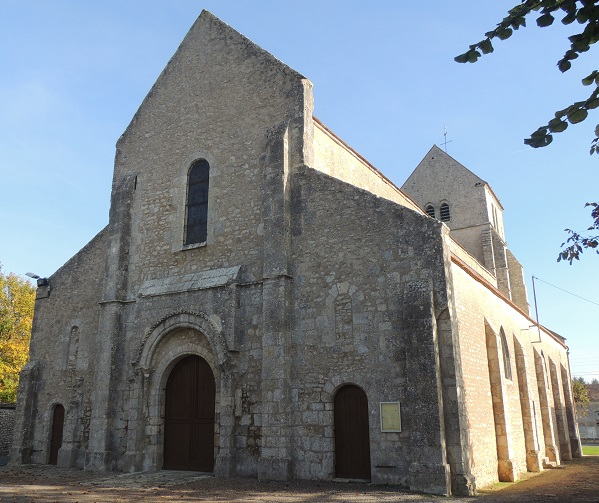

- Coat of arms
- Location of Le Puiset
- Location within France Location within Centre-Val de Loire
- Coordinates: 48°12′33″N 1°51′58″E
- Country: France
- Region: Centre-Val de Loire
- Department: Eure-et-Loir
- Arrondissement: Chartres
- Canton: Voves
- Commune: Janville-en-Beauce
- Area^{1}: 7.91 km^{2} (3.05 sq mi)
- Elevation: 144 m (472 ft)
- Highest elevation: 150 m (490 ft)
- Lowest elevation: 132 m (433 ft)
- Population (2023): 383
  - Density: 48.4/km^{2} (125/sq mi)
- Time zone: UTC+01:00 (CET)
  - Summer (DST): UTC+02:00 (CEST)
- Postal code: 28310
- ^{1} French Land Register data, which excludes lakes, ponds, glaciers > 1 km^{2} (0.386 sq mi or 247 acres) and river estuaries.

Le Puiset (French pronunciation: [lə pɥizɛ]) is a former commune in the Eure-et-Loir department in northern France. On 1 January 2019, it was merged into the new commune Janville-en-Beauce.

== Name ==
The name Le Puiset comes from Latin puteus, pit or cistern, whence French puits, well. It takes its name from a local spring. In medieval sources, its name is given as Puteolum, Puteacum, Pusiacum, Puisiacum or Pusatum in Latin and as Puisat or Puysiax (among others) in French. Its inhabitants were called Puteacenses.

== History ==
In the Middle Ages it was the site of a lordship within the County of Blois and Chartres. The lords descended from the counts of Breteuil, and often also held the position of viscount of Chartres. They participated in the Norman Conquest and the crusades of the 12th century, and were cousins of the dynasty of the Kings of Jerusalem.

== See also ==
- Communes of the Eure-et-Loir department
