= Prophecies about Joan of Arc =

Prophecies about a young Maid who would save France, around the time of Joan of Arc

For some years before and around the time of activity of Joan of Arc, a number of vague prophecies were circulating, concerning a young Maid who would save France. The prophecies were attributed to several sources, including St. Bede the Venerable, Euglide of Hungary, and Merlin. Some of these spoke of a Maid who was supposed to come from the "borders of Lorraine". Joan's home village of Domrémy was near the border between the French Duchy of Bar and the Duchy of Lorraine in the Holy Roman Empire, so at the time many in France believed in her.

During her examination at Poitiers, Joan was reportedly questioned about a recent prophecy attributed (perhaps incorrectly) to Marie d'Avignon concerning an armed woman who was to save the kingdom. One version of the prophecies held that the Maid would come forth from an oak wood and would work miracles, although when questioned about this version of the prophecy at her trial, Joan said she did not place any faith in that one.

Rehabilitation trial testimony also brought up the subject of such prophecies. Joan's uncle Durand Laxart, who accompanied Joan on both of her journeys to Vaucouleurs, reported at the rehabilitation trial that Joan had told him, "Was it not said that France would be ruined through a woman and afterwards restored by a virgin?" Catherine Royer, with whom Joan stayed while at Vaucouleurs on her second visit in January and February 1429, also reported substantially the same thing.
