= Rouvray-Saint-Denis =

- Part of Neuville Saint Denis
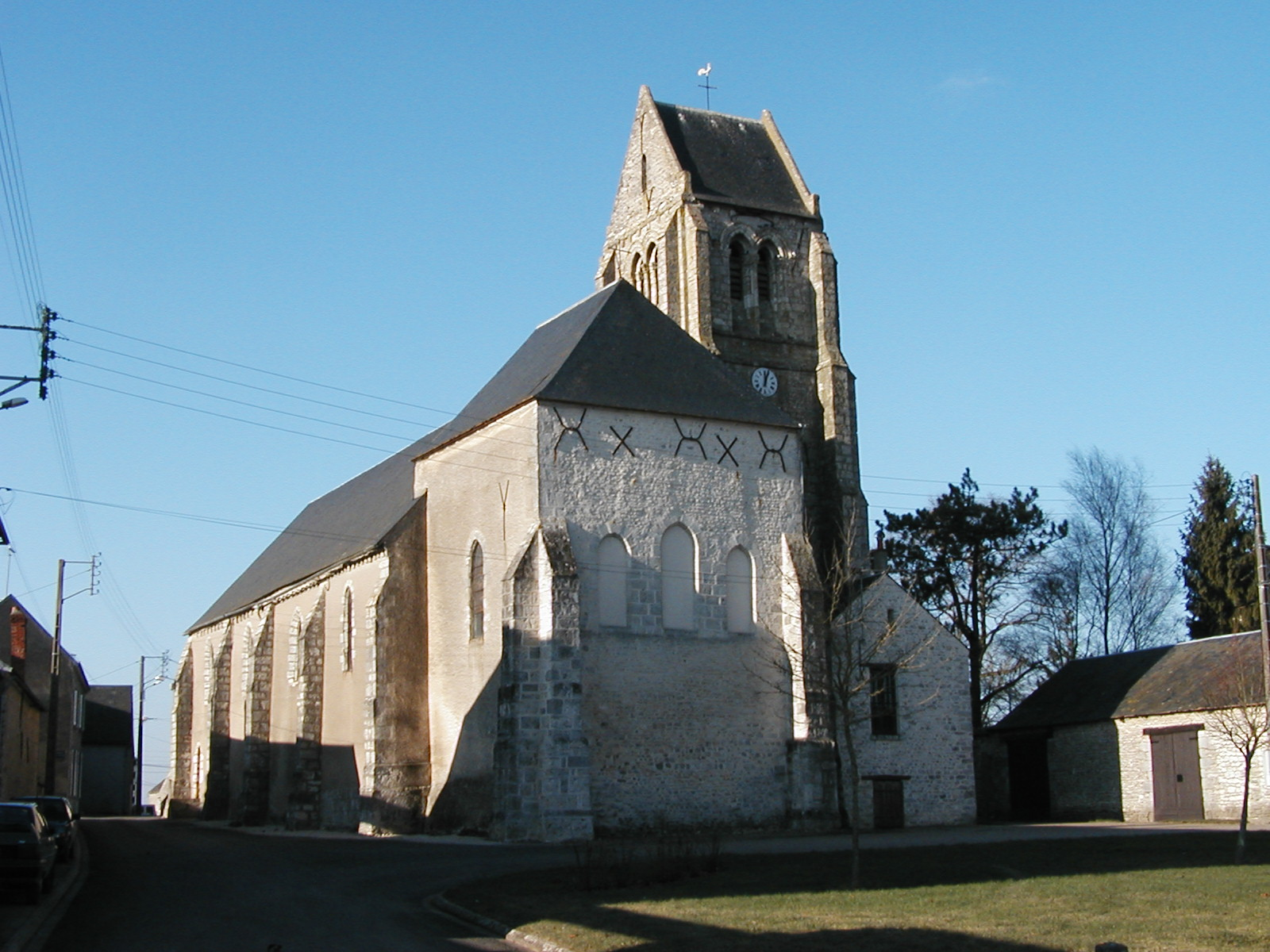
- The church of Saint Denis
- Location of Rouvray-Saint-Denis
- Location within France Location within Centre-Val de Loire
- Coordinates: 48°16′44″N 1°56′43″E
- Country: France
- Region: Centre-Val de Loire
- Department: Eure-et-Loir
- Arrondissement: Chartres
- Canton: Les Villages Vovéens
- Commune: Neuville Saint Denis
- Area^{1}: 19.35 km^{2} (7.47 sq mi)
- Elevation: 138 m (453 ft)
- Highest elevation: 147 m (482 ft)
- Lowest elevation: 129 m (423 ft)
- Population (2023): 343
  - Density: 17.7/km^{2} (45.9/sq mi)
- Time zone: UTC+01:00 (CET)
  - Summer (DST): UTC+02:00 (CEST)
- Postal code: 28310
- ^{1} French Land Register data, which excludes lakes, ponds, glaciers > 1 km^{2} (0.386 sq mi or 247 acres) and river estuaries.

Rouvray-Saint-Denis (French pronunciation: [ʁuvʁɛ sɛ̃ dəni]) is a former commune in the Eure-et-Loir department in northern France. It was merged into the new commune Neuville Saint Denis on 1 January 2025.

== History ==
It has long been thought that it was the site of the Battle of the Herrings in 1429, when Sir John Fastolf beat off an attack on an English convoy taking supplies to the siege of Orléans; but in his biography of Fastolf, The Real Falstaff, Stephen Cooper argues that the battle is more likely to have taken place at Rouvray-Sainte-Croix.

== See also ==
- Communes of the Eure-et-Loir department
