= Jean Pasquerel =

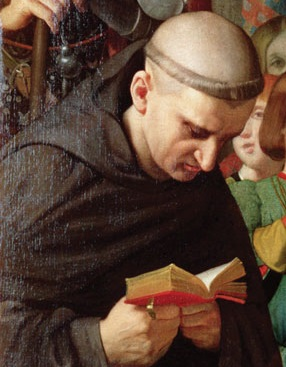

Jean Pasquerel (c. 1400) was an Augustinian friar (member of the Order of St. Augustine), almoner and confessor of Joan of Arc.
