= Loire Campaign (1429) =

Military campaign during the Hundred Years' War

- Part of the Hundred Years' War (1415–53 phase)
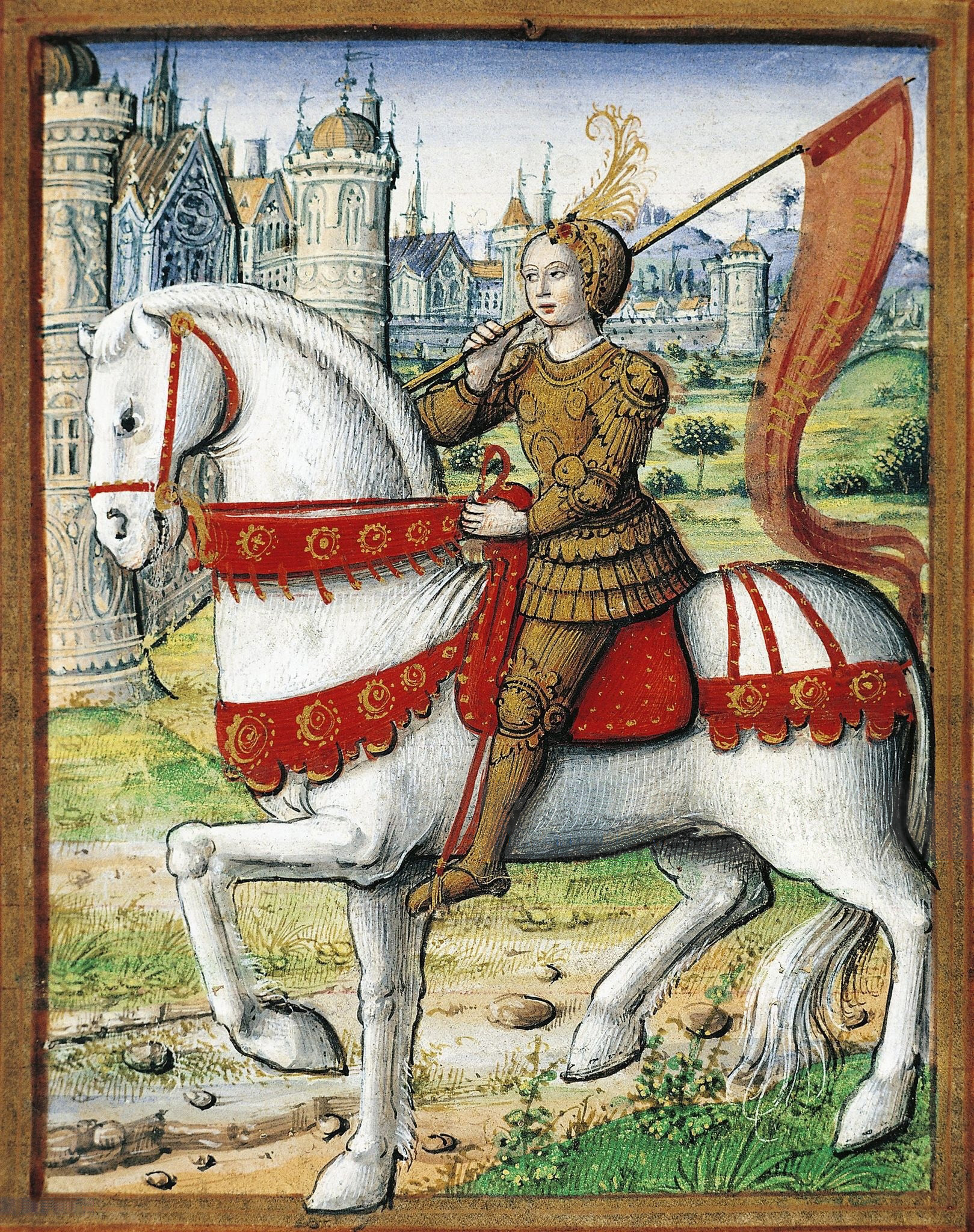
- Joan of Arc, the leader of the campaign.
Date	12 October 1428 – 18 June 1429
Location	Loire river valley, France
Result	French victory: March to Reims

Belligerents
Kingdom of France; Kingdom of Scotland	Kingdom of England; Burgundian State

Commanders and leaders
Joan of Arc; John of Alençon; La Hire; Jean de Xaintrailles; Jean de Dunois; Gilles de Rais; Jean de Brosse	John Talbot (surrendered); Thomas de Scales (surrendered); John Fastolf; William de la Pole (surrendered); Thomas Montacute †

Strength
About 19,900 troops	About 11,200 troops

Casualties and losses
Over 2,500 killed	About 9,000 killed

The Loire Campaign was a campaign launched by Joan of Arc during the Hundred Years' War. The Loire was cleared of all English and Burgundian troops.

== Campaign ==
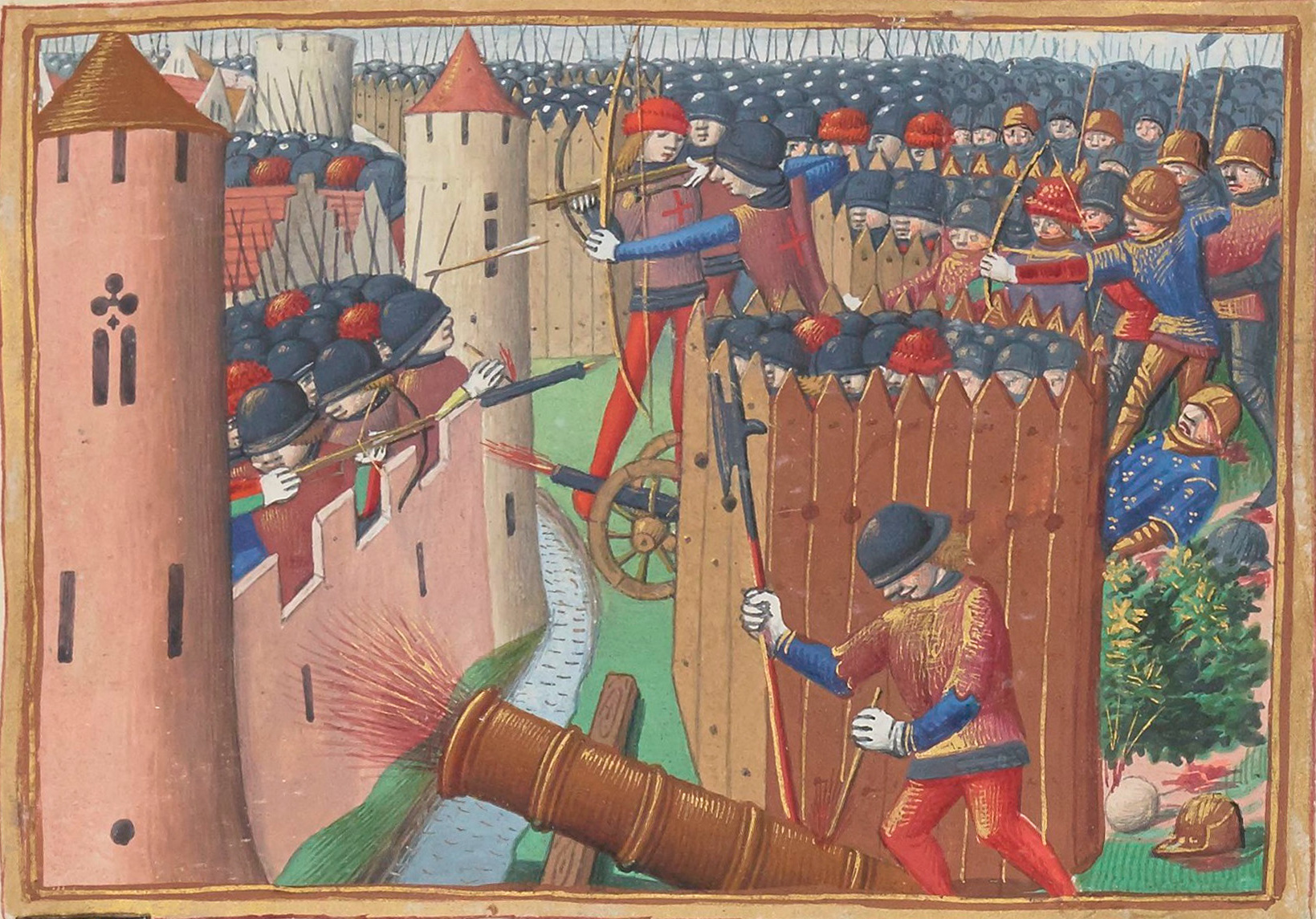
The English attack Joan of Arc's positions at the Siege of Orléans.

The English under John, Duke of Bedford ordered John, Lord Talbot to besiege Orléans with his subordinates, the Earl of Suffolk and the Earl of Salisbury. The English nearly succeeded.

However, Joan of Arc led a series of counterattacks. Joan, aided by Gilles de Rais, Jean de Dunois, and Jean de Brosse attacked the English siege positions. The English could not stand these attacks. Lord Talbot had to retreat and break off the siege.

=== The Battle of Jargeau ===
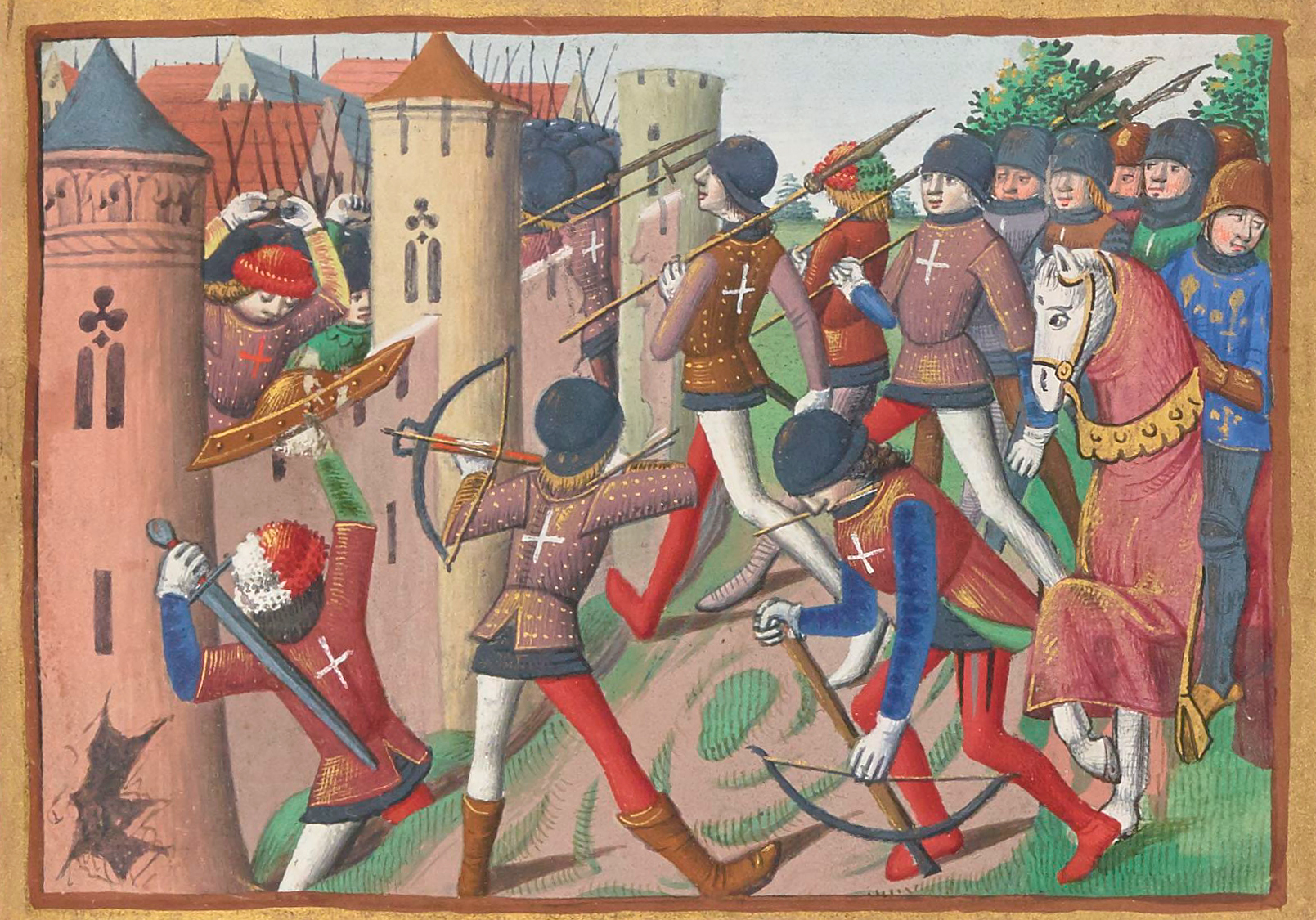
The English are mowed down by arrows at the Battle of Jargeau.

Then, Joan and John II, Duke of Alençon marched to capture Jargeau from the Earl of Suffolk. The English had 700 troops to face 1,200 French troops. Then, a battle began with a French assault on the suburbs. English defenders left the city walls and the French fell back. Joan of Arc used her standard to begin a French rally. The English retreated to the city walls and the French lodged in the suburbs for the night.

The following morning Joan of Arc called upon the defenders to surrender. They refused. The following French heavy artillery bombardment was with primitive cannons and siege engines. Over the course of the day, one of the towers fell. Suffolk entered surrender nominations with a minor French captain, La Hire. The French command was agonized by the breach in protocol.

Joan of Arc initiated an assault on the town walls, surviving a stone projectile that split in two against her helmet as she climbed a scaling ladder. The English suffered heavy losses. Most estimates place the number at 300–400 of some 700 combatants. Suffolk became a prisoner. The French had some 1,200 troops and their losses appear to have been light. Joan moved her army to Meung-sur-Loire. There, she decided to launch an assault.

=== The Battle of Meung-sur-Loire ===
Then, Joan began her attacks. English defenses at Meung-sur-Loire consisted of three components: the walled town, the fortification at the bridge, and a large walled castle just outside the town. The castle served as headquarters to the English command of John, Lord Talbot and Thomas, Lord Scales.

Joan of Arc and Duke John II of Alençon controlled a force that included captains Jean d'Orléans, Gilles de Rais, Jean Poton de Xaintrailles, and La Hire. Estimates of French numerical strength vary, with the Journal du Siège d'Orléans citing around 6,000-7,000 for the French. A number of that size likely counts noncombatants.

The English force's numbers remain uncertain, but are lower than the French. They were led by Lord Talbot and Lord Scales. Bypassing the city and the castle, they staged a frontal assault on the bridge fortifications, conquered it in one day, and installed a garrison. This hampered English movement south of the Loire.

=== The Battle of Beaugency ===
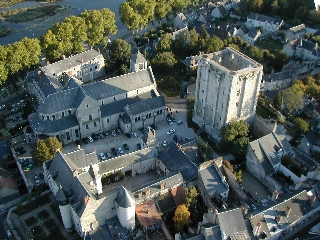
The Castle at Beaugency still stands today.

Then, Joan continued her campaign. She launched an attack on Beaugency. Joan of Arc and Duke John II of Alençon controlled a force that included captains Jean d'Orléans, Gilles de Rais, Jean Poton de Xaintrailles, and La Hire. John Talbot led the English defense. Breaking with siege warfare custom, the French army followed the 15 June capture of the bridge at Meung-sur-Loire not with an attack on that town or its castle but with an assault on neighboring Beaugency the next day.

Unlike Meung-sur-Loire, the main stronghold at Beaugency was inside the city walls. It survives to the modern age and forms an imposing rectangular citadel. During the first day of fighting the English abandoned the town and retreated into the castle as the French bombarded the castle with artillery fire. De Richemont and his force arrived that evening.

Hearing news of an English relief force approaching from Paris under Sir John Fastolf, d'Alençon negotiated the English surrender and granted them safe conduct out of Beaugency. The Battle of Patay followed on open territory on 18 June.

=== The Battle of Patay ===
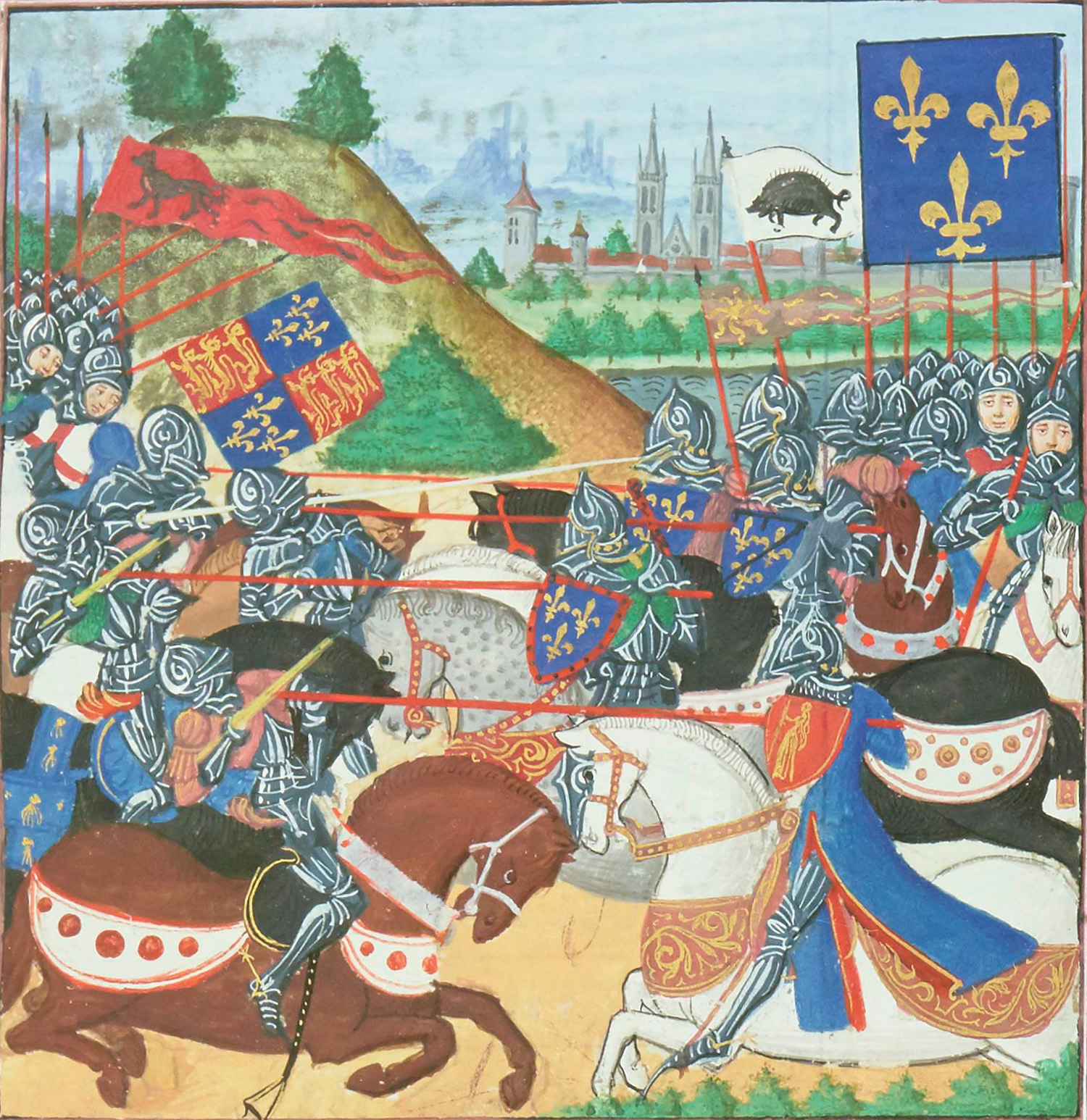
The French and English joust into battle. In reality, the English had no horse in the battle.

An English reinforcement army under Sir John Fastolf departed from Paris following the defeat at Orléans. The French had moved swiftly, capturing three bridges and accepting the English surrender at Beaugency the day before Fastolf's army arrived. The French, in the belief that they could not overcome a fully prepared English army in open battle, scoured the area in hopes of finding the English unprepared and vulnerable.

The English reconnoitered with the remaining defenders at Meung-sur-Loire. The French had taken only the bridge at this location, not the neighboring castle or the town. Retreating defenders from Beaugency joined them. The English excelled at open battles; they took up a position whose exact location is unknown but traditionally believed to be near the tiny village of Patay. Fastolf, John Talbot and Sir Thomas de Scales commanded the English.

The standard defensive tactic of the English longbowmen was to drive pointed stakes into the ground near their positions. This prevented cavalry charges and slowed infantry long enough for the longbows to take a decisive toll on the enemy line. However, the English archers inadvertently disclosed their position to French scouts before their preparations were complete when a lone stag wandered onto a nearby field and the archers raised a hunting cry.

On hearing the news of the English position, about 1,500 men under the captains La Hire and Jean Poton de Xaintrailles, composing the heavily armed and armoured cavalry vanguard of the French army, attacked the English. The battle swiftly turned into a rout, with every Englishman on a horse fleeing while the infantry, consisting mostly of longbowmen, were cut down in droves. Longbowmen were never intended to fight armoured knights unsupported except from prepared positions where the knights could not charge them, and they were massacred. For once the French tactic of a large frontal cavalry assault had succeeded, with decisive results.

Captain Jean Dagneau captured the famous general John Talbot. After this feat of arms, Dagneau was ennobled in March 1438 by Charles VII, King of France, which is at the origin of the family name of Dagneau de Richecour.
