= Siege of Compiègne =

1430 battle of the Hundred Years' War

- Part of the Hundred Years' War (1415–53 phase)
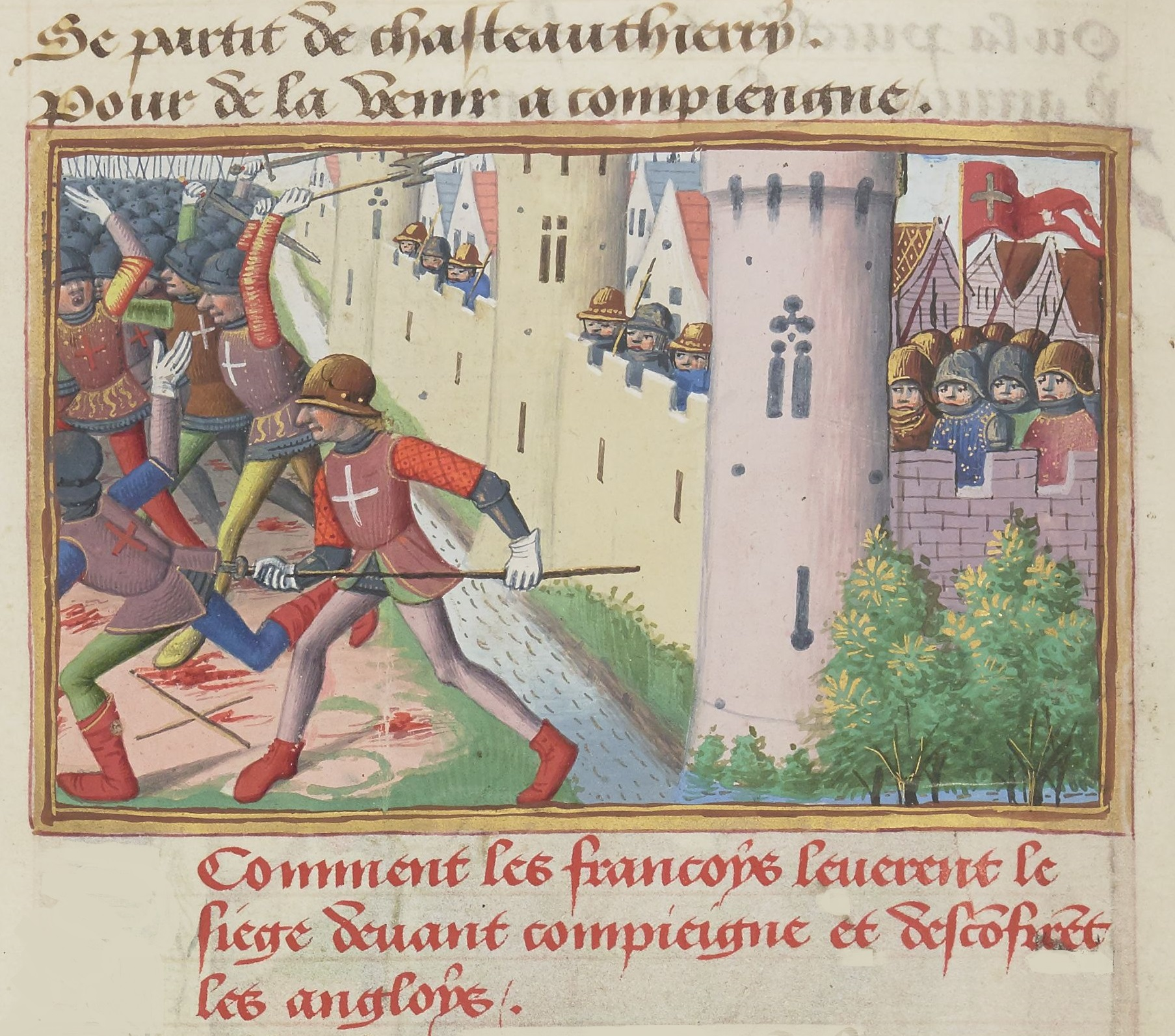
- Siege of Compiègne by Martial d'Auvergne
Date	May – early November 1430
Location	Compiègne, south of Amiens, France 49°24′54″N 2°49′23″E
Result	French victory

Belligerents
Kingdom of France	Burgundian State; Kingdom of England

Commanders and leaders
Joan of Arc (POW); Guillaume de Flavy; Louis I, Count of Vendôme; Florent d'Illiers; Poton de Xaintrailles	Count of Ligny; Earl of Huntingdon; Earl of Arundel

Strength
Unknown	Unknown

Casualties and losses
More than the English, Joan of Arc captured	Less than the French
- Location within France

The siege of Compiègne (1430) was conducted by Duke Philip III of Burgundy after the town of Compiègne had refused to transfer allegiance to him under the terms of a treaty with Charles VII of France. The siege is perhaps best known for Joan of Arc's capture by Burgundian troops while accompanying an Armagnac force during a skirmish outside the town on 23 May 1430. Although this was otherwise a minor siege, both politically and militarily, and ultimately ended in a defeat for the Burgundians, the capture of Joan of Arc was an important event of the Hundred Years' War.

== Background ==
During this era, late in the Hundred Years' War, the politically independent Philip the Good, Duke of Burgundy, was allied with England under the regency of John, Duke of Bedford (who was the uncle of the child King, Henry VI). These two allies had conquered most of northern France during the preceding ten years. They suffered stunning losses in 1429 to a reinvigorated French army under the joint command of Joan of Arc and Duke John II of Alençon.

The French had defeated the English at Patay on 18 June 1429 and had proceeded northeastward to crown King Charles VII of France at Rheims without further resistance, accepting the peaceful surrender of every town along their path. Compiègne was not along that road – its location is north of Paris – but along with several other cities it declared allegiance to Charles VII shortly after his coronation. It had previously been under Burgundian control.

== Events ==
=== Preparation ===
In March 1430 the French court learned that Philip the Good, duke of Burgundy, planned to lay siege to the city. The count of Clermont delivered a message to the city that Compiègne was his according to legal treaty (Note: He was married to Agnes of Burgundy, daughter of the late Duke of Burgundy, John the Fearless.) and demanded a surrender. Residents of the city expressed strong opposition to the demand and the French garrison commander Guillaume de Flavy readied the city for action.

Count John of Luxembourg departed for the expedition in command of the vanguard on 4 April. Philip the Good departed from Péronne on 22 April. Meanwhile, the Duke of Bedford was waiting at Calais for the arrival of King Henry VI of England, a nine-year-old boy who had recently been crowned king of England.

According to Régine Pernoud and Marie-Veronique Clin, Philip the Good planned to retake command of the cities that controlled the Oise river. Bedford supported the strategy in order to protect Île-de-France and Paris, which was then under Anglo-Burgundian control. King Charles VII of France had been hoping for a peace treaty with Burgundy but realized on 6 May that he had been duped by false promises.

Joan of Arc had realized the danger before the king did, and began meeting with a few Royal commanders in the area in an attempt to convince them to come to the city's aid. By April she had convinced several commanders, including Florent d'Illiers and an Italian mercenary commander named Bartolomeo Baretta, resulting in a company of about 300–400 volunteers. She departed for Compiègne, possibly without the king's knowledge, and arrived at the city on 14 May.

=== Combat ===
Several minor actions took place in the days that followed. Two days later Captain Louis de Flavy fled an artillery bombardment at Choisy-au-Bac and took refuge at Compiègne. On 18 May Joan of Arc's group, which by that point included Regnault of Chartres and the Count of Vendôme, attempted to surprise the Burgundians at Soissons. Residents of Soissons refused them entry and declared allegiance to Burgundy the following day.

On the morning of May 23, the defenders of Compiegne launched an assault against the Burgundians at Margny, attacking an outpost while it was separated from the main force. Count John of Luxembourg noticed the action by chance while taking a survey of the territory and called in reinforcements. These reinforcements outnumbered the attackers and the Armagnac commanders ordered a retreat over the objections of Joan of Arc, who urged them to stand and fight. They refused, and ordered a rearguard to screen the rest of the force as it retreated toward the town. Joan of Arc chose to remain with the rearguard, carrying her banner on her horse.

=== Capture of Joan of Arc ===
The next moments remain a source of scholarly debate. The city gate closed before the rearguard could return to the town. This was either a reasonable action to prevent the Burgundians from entering the city after they had seized the end of the bridge; or an act of betrayal by Guillaume de Flavy. In the words of Kelly DeVries, "both the accusers and defenders must in turn either indict or vindicate the character of Compiègne's governor, Guillaume de Flavy, and the role he played in shutting off any escape possibility for Joan of Arc on that day." The French rearguard that remained outside had no means of avoiding capture.

According to the Burgundian chronicler Georges Chastellain and other sources, Burgundian troops soon surrounded the rearguard and shouted at Joan of Arc to surrender, eager to capture such a famous figure. She refused. Finally, a Burgundian crossbowman, "a rough and very sour man", maneuvered his horse behind her and "grabbed the edge of her cloth-of-gold doublet, and threw her from her horse flat to the ground".

She then surrendered to Lionel, Bastard of Vendôme, who was in the service of the Count of Ligny.

Guillaume de Flavy was blamed by some sources for allegedly ordering the drawbridge raised behind the rearguard. Although the defense of Compiègne was eventually successful several months later when the Burgundian army was forced to withdraw, nonetheless accusations of misconduct regarding Joan of Arc's capture caused the decline of de Flavy's career.
