= Jargeau =

- Commune
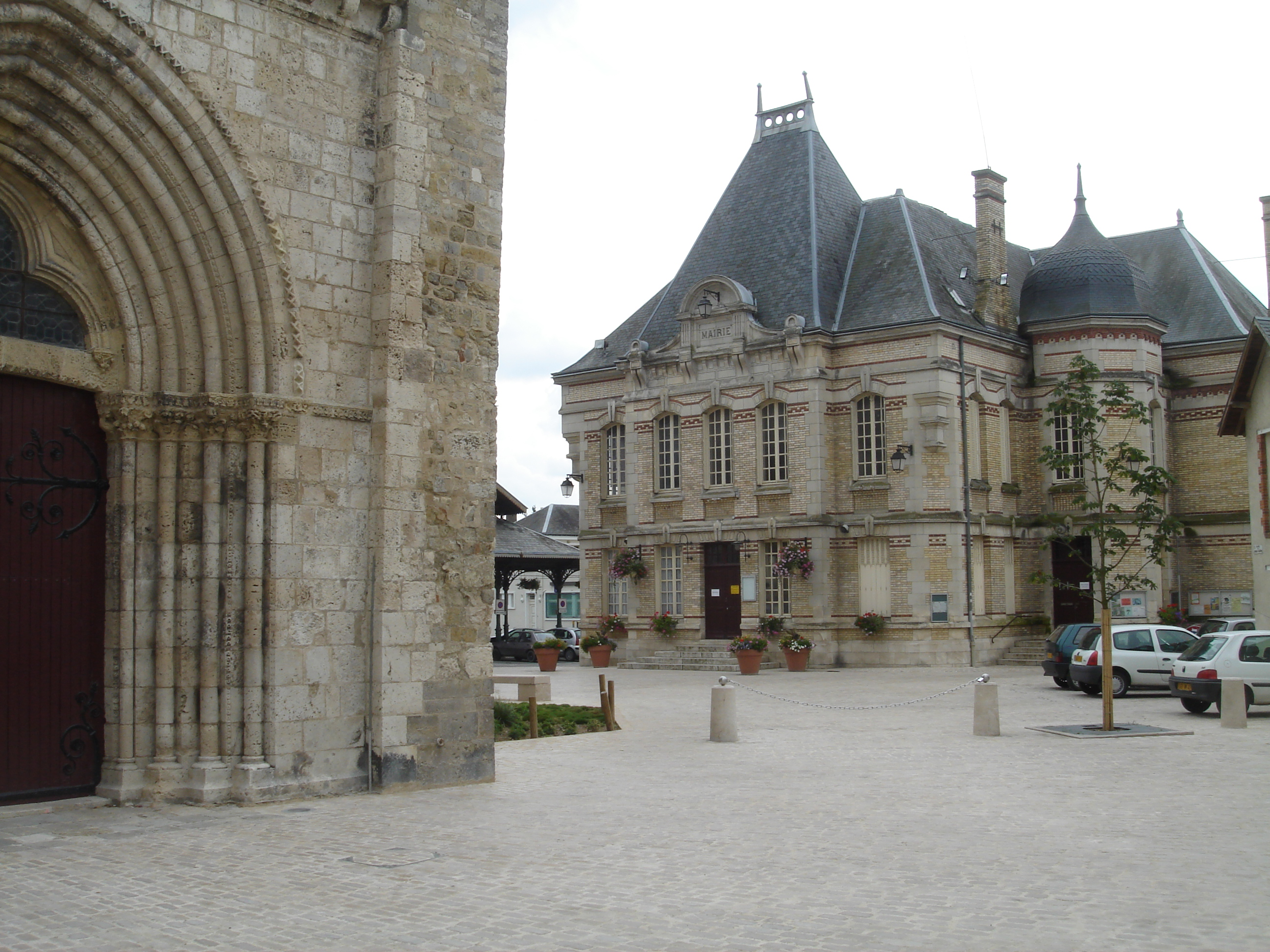
- Town hall

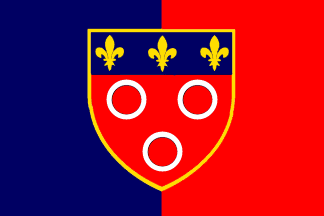
- Flag Coat of arms
- Location of Jargeau
- Location within France Location within Centre-Val de Loire
- Coordinates: 47°52′00″N 2°07′20″E
- Country: France
- Region: Centre-Val de Loire
- Department: Loiret
- Arrondissement: Orléans
- Canton: Châteauneuf-sur-Loire
- Intercommunality: Loges

Government
  - Mayor (2020–2026): Sophie Héron
- Area^{1}: 14.66 km^{2} (5.66 sq mi)
- Highest elevation: 108 m (354 ft)
- Lowest elevation: 97 m (318 ft)
- Population (2023): 4,610
  - Density: 314/km^{2} (814/sq mi)
- Time zone: UTC+01:00 (CET)
  - Summer (DST): UTC+02:00 (CEST)
- INSEE/Postal code: 45173 /45150
- ^{1} French Land Register data, which excludes lakes, ponds, glaciers > 1 km^{2} (0.386 sq mi or 247 acres) and river estuaries.

Jargeau (French pronunciation: [ʒaʁʒo]) is a commune in the Loiret department in north-central France.

It lies about 119 km (74 mi) south of Paris.

== Geography ==
The town is located in the French natural region of the Loire Valley, the former province of Orleans and the urban area of Orleans. It has a flat terrain with an altitude of about 100 metres (330 ft). The maximum elevation is 108 metres (354 ft) where the church stands, and the minimum of 97 metres (318 ft). Its territory is included in the southern part of the Paris Basin and therefore has the basin's geological features.

The Loire flows along the north edge of town. The river is mostly underground, which can cause circular bed collapses called Bîmes, making the sandy shores unstable. Like all cities located on the course of the Loire and in the southern Paris Basin, Jargeau is in middle Loire. The Marmagne, a tributary of the Dhuy, runs through the southeastern area of the municipality.

== Population ==
Historical population
Year	Pop.	±% p.a.
1968	2,843	—
1975	2,855	+0.06%
1982	3,376	+2.42%
1990	3,561	+0.67%
1999	3,979	+1.24%
2007	4,332	+1.07%
2012	4,479	+0.67%
2017	4,604	+0.55%
2023	4,610	+0.02%
Source: INSEE

== Notable people ==
- Thomas Montacute, 4th Earl of Salisbury (1388-1428), English commander who participated in taking Jargeau during the Hundred Years War
- Drouet de Dammartin or Dreux de Dammartin (died 1413), French sculptor and architect, ended his life in Jargeau.
- Jean de Dammartin or Jehan de Dampmartin (died 1453), French architect, born in Jargeau. The prime builder of the Le Mans Cathedral in 1421 and the Tours Cathedral in 1432
- Several figures are related to the Battle of Jargeau
  - Joan of Arc (1412-1431) delivered the city from the English in 1429 and was assisted by her companions Jean V de Bueil (1406-1477) André de Laval-Montmorency (1408-1486 ), Guy XIV de Laval (1406-1486), Gilles de Rais (c. 1405 – 1440), Louis, Count of Vendôme (1376-1446), Ambroise de Loré (1395-1446).
  - On the other side, the mercenary Étienne de Vignolles (1390-1443) and Jean Poton de Xaintrailles (circa 1390-1461 ) also participated in the battle. Jean de Dunois (1402-1468) joined the company of which he was captain to those of Jean II, Duke of Alençon, and commanded at the Battle of Jargeau. Captain William de la Pole, Duke of Suffolk (1396-1450) led the British troops occupying Jargeau.
- King Louis XI of France (1423-1483) signed the marriage contract of his eldest daughter Anne (1461-1522) and Pierre de Beaujeu (1438-1503) in 1473 at Jargeau.
- Albert Viger (1843-1926), French politician, was born in Jargeau, MP and senator of Loiret, Minister of Agriculture under the Third Republic., commandeur de la Légion d'honneur
- Louis-Oscar Roty (1846-1911), French designer of coins and stamps, medal engraver. The museum and the Oscar Roty Foundation are located in Jargeau.
- Jeanne Chauvin (1862–1926), the second woman to obtain a degree in law in France, and the second French woman to be authorized to plead at the bar, in 1900.
- Octave Denis Victor Guillonnet (1872 - 1967), French painter, spent his childhood in the town.
- Charles Genty (1876 - 1956), cartoonist, illustrator and painter, was born in Jargeau.
- Michel Regnier, Québécois director, cinematographer, editor and writer was born in Jargeau in 1934.
- Élisabeth Lerminier, French journalist was born Jargeau in 1947.
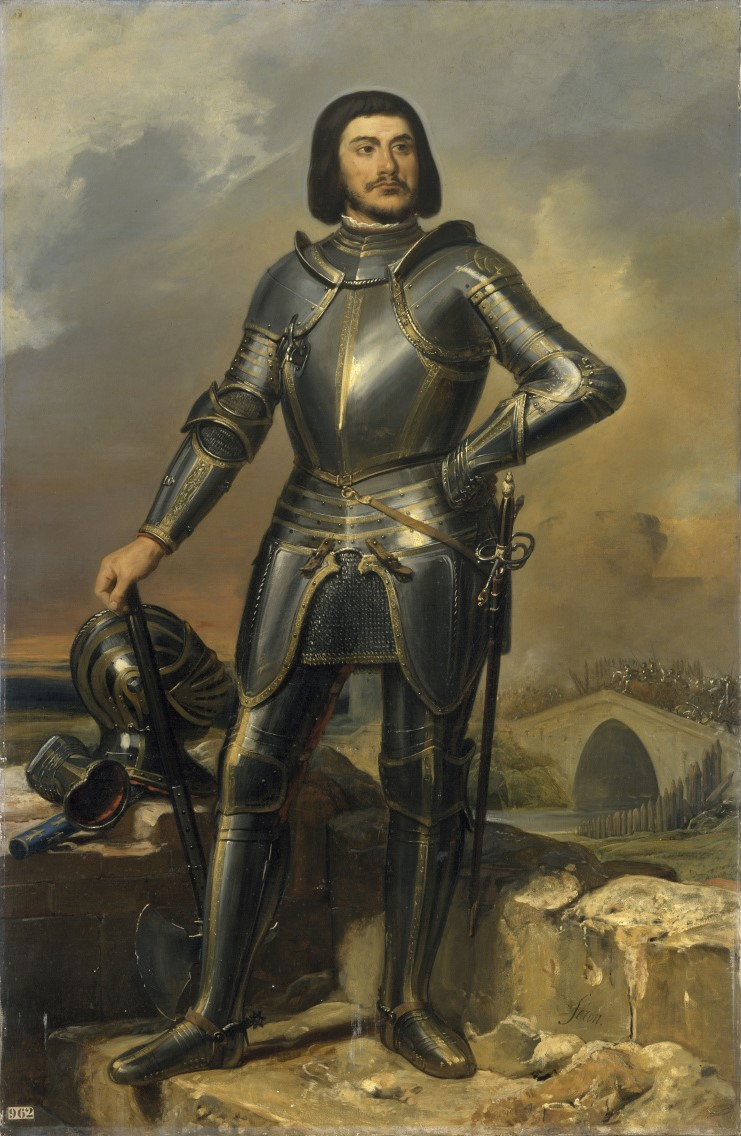
Gilles de Rais

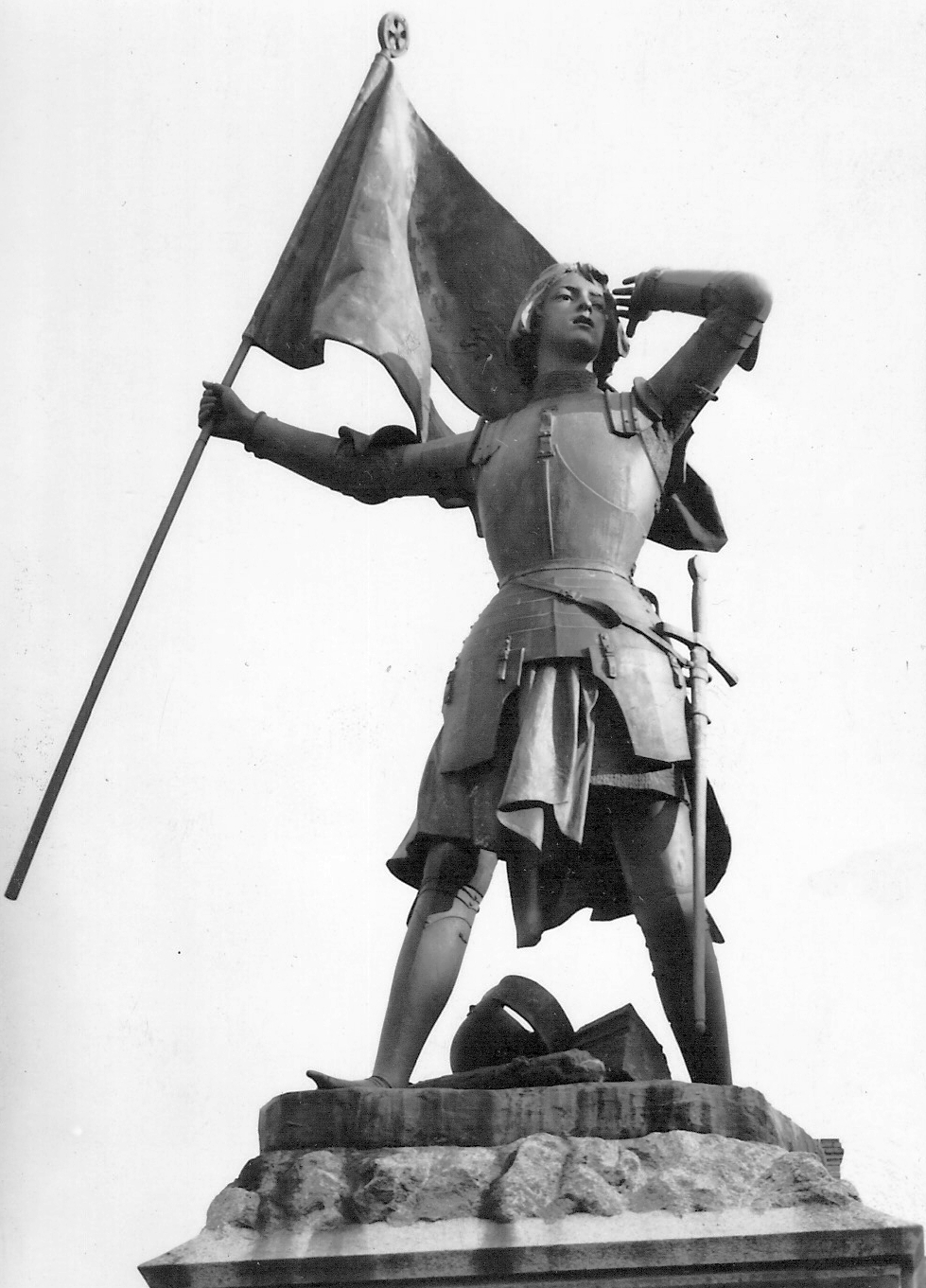
Statue de Jeanne d'Arc d'Alfred Lanson

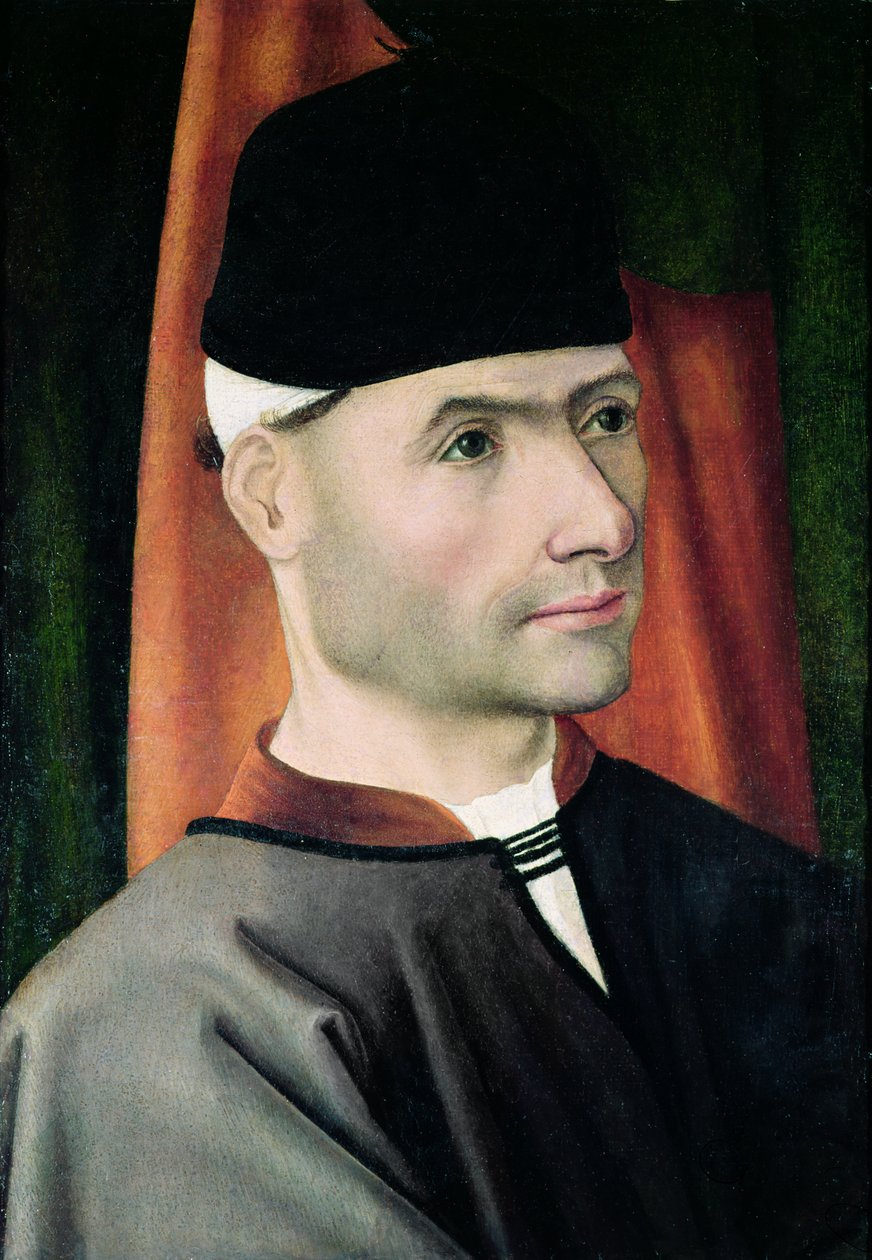
Jean de Dunois

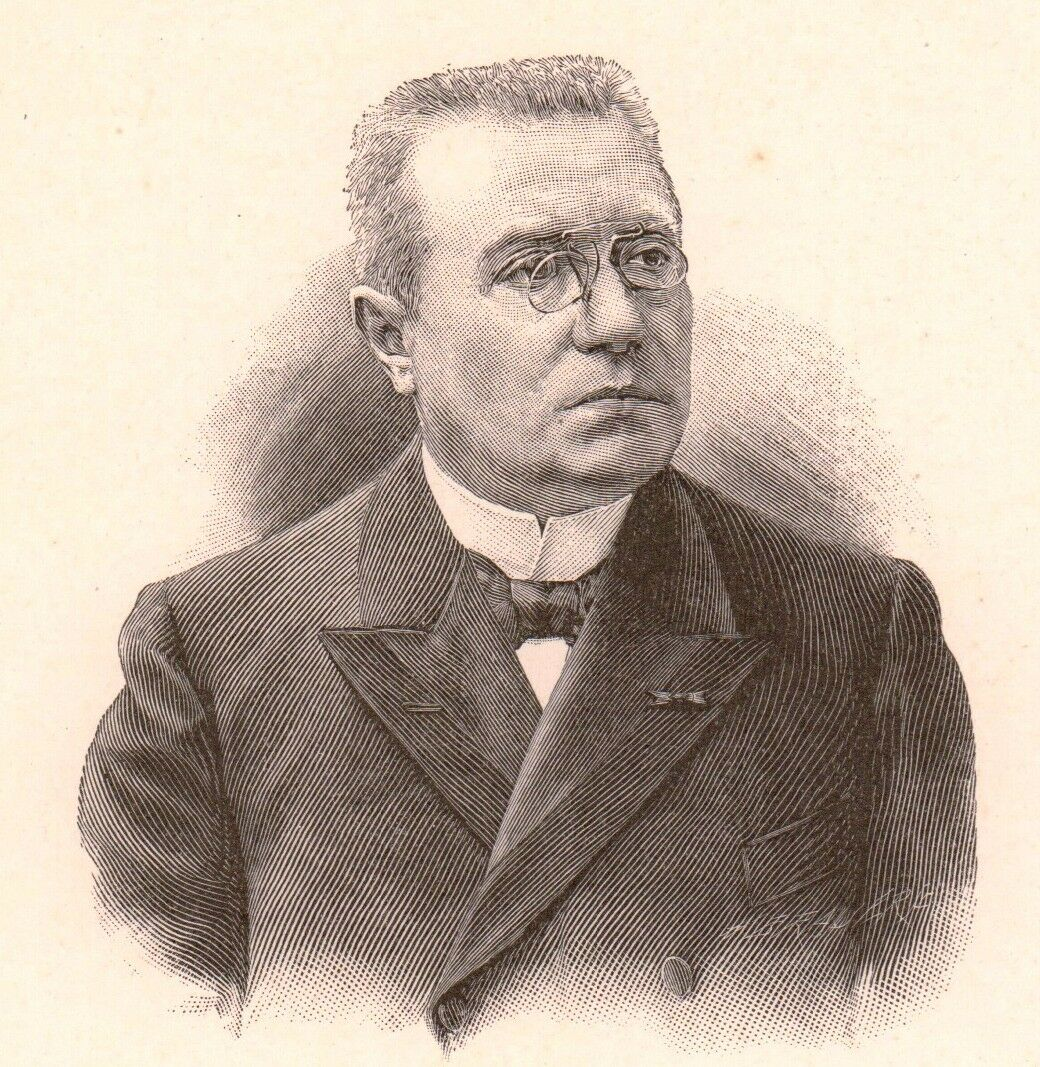
Albert Viger

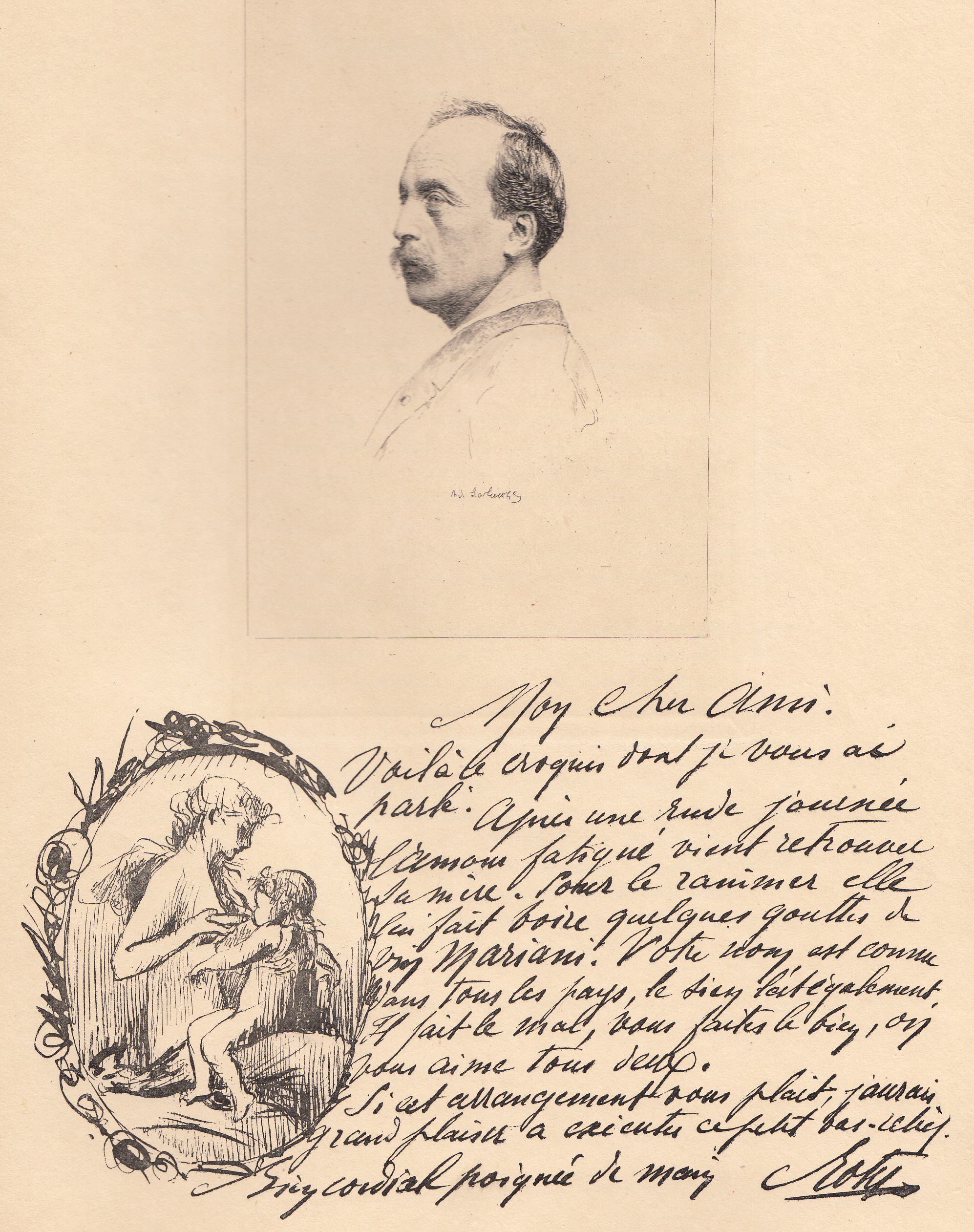
Oscar Roty

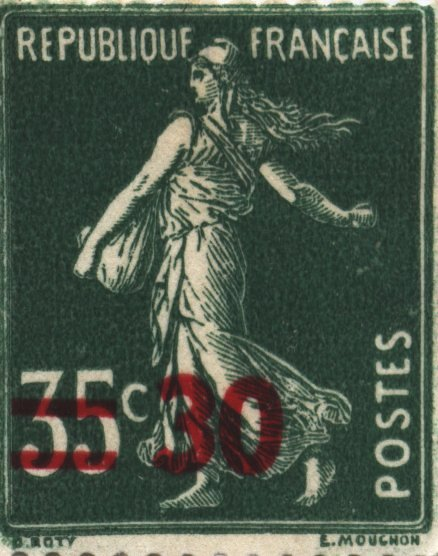
La Semeuse d'Oscar Roty sur un timbre de la poste française

== Twin towns ==
The town is twinned with:

- (United Kingdom) Corsham
- (Germany) Reilingen

== See also ==
- Communes of the Loiret department
