= Battle of Beaugency =

The Battle of Beaugency may refer to one of two battles:

- Battle of Beaugency (1429), battle of the Hundred Years' War
- Battle of Beaugency (1870), battle of the Franco-Prussian War
