= Battle of Beaugency (1429) =

Battle of the Hundred Years' War

Coordinates: 46.7958°N 1.6492°E

- Part of the Hundred Years' War
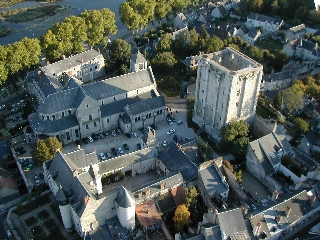
- An aerial view of Beaugency as it stands today.; English defenders retreated into the tower on the right.
Date	16–17 June 1429
Location	Beaugency, France
Result	French victory

Belligerents
Kingdom of France	Kingdom of England

Commanders and leaders
Joan of Arc; John II of Alençon	John Talbot

The Battle of Beaugency took place on 16 and 17 June 1429. It was one of Joan of Arc's battles. Shortly after relieving the siege at Orléans, French forces recaptured the neighboring district along the Loire river.

== Background ==
Beaugency was a small town on the northern bank of the Loire river in central France. It controlled a bridge of strategic significance during the latter part of the war. Conquered by the English a few years earlier as a staging point for a planned invasion of southern France, the French attack recaptured the bridge and the town, providing a vital supply conduit for the summer offensive in the north and the coronation of King Charles VII of France.

The French Loire campaign of 1429 consisted of five actions:

1. The Siege of Orléans.
2. The Battle of Jargeau.
3. The Battle of Meung-sur-Loire.
4. The Battle of Beaugency.
5. The Battle of Patay.

Virtually all of France north of the Loire had fallen to foreign occupation by the end of 1428. The bridge at Orléans had been destroyed shortly before the siege lifted. The French had lost control of all other river crossings. Three swift and numerically small battles at Jargeau, Meung-sur-Loire, and Beaugency demonstrated renewed French confidence and laid the groundwork for subsequent French offenses on Rheims and Paris. The Loire campaign killed, captured, or disgraced a majority of the top tier of English commanders and decimated the numbers of the highly skilled English longbowmen.

French recruitment swelled following the victory at Orléans. During the assault on Beaugency one volunteer caused a particular stir among the French command. Constable Arthur de Richemont, who had been in disgrace at court for two years, appeared with a force of 1,000 men and offered his services. At the risk of royal disfavor Joan of Arc accepted this aid.

== Tactics ==
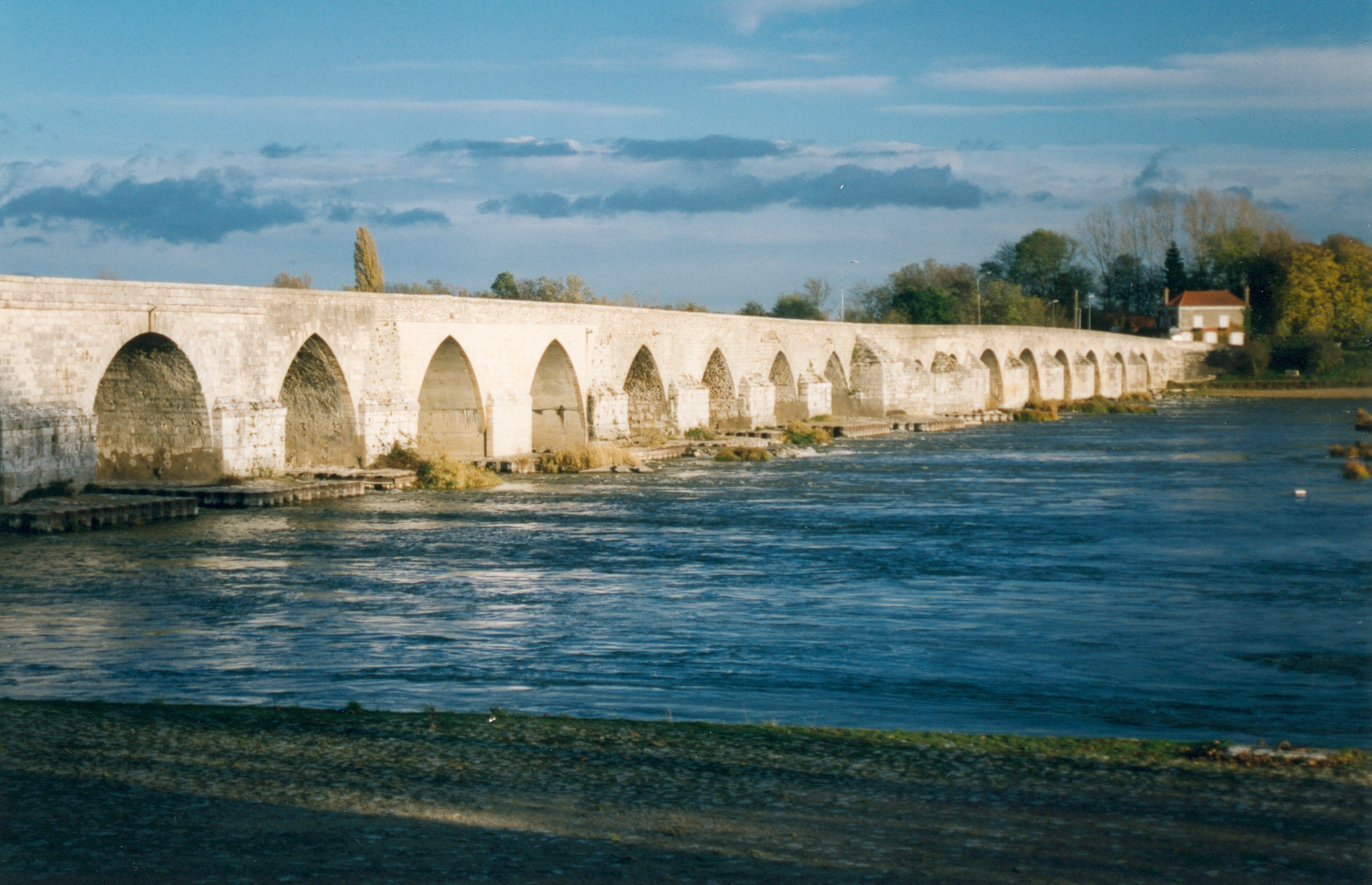
The Loire campaign restored French control of strategic bridges. The one at Beaugency remains operational nearly six centuries after the battle.

Joan of Arc and Duke John II of Alençon controlled a force that included the captains Jean d'Orléans, Gilles de Rais, Jean Poton de Xaintrailles, and La Hire. John Talbot, 1st Earl of Shrewsbury led the English defence. Breaking with the then-prevalent form of siege warfare, the French army followed the capture of the bridge at Meung-sur-Loire on the 15 June, not with an attack on that town or its castle but with an assault on neighbouring Beaugency the next day.

Unlike Meung-sur-Loire, the main stronghold at Beaugency was inside the city walls. It survives to the modern age and forms an imposing rectangular citadel. During the first day of fighting the English abandoned the town and retreated into the castle. The French bombarded the castle with artillery fire. That evening de Richemont and his force arrived.

Hearing news of an English relief force approaching from Paris under Sir John Fastolf, d'Alençon negotiated the English surrender and granted them safe conduct out of Beaugency. The Battle of Patay followed on open territory on 18 June.

== See also ==
- Beaugency
- Medieval warfare

== Bibliography ==
- Devries, Kelly. Joan of Arc: A Military Leader (Glaucestershire: Sutton Publishing, 1999). ISBN 0-7509-1805-5
- Richey, Stephen W. Joan of Arc: The Warrior Saint. (Westport, CT: Praeger, 2003). ISBN 0-275-98103-7
