= Charles Genty =

French painter, illustrator, and caricaturist

Charles Genty (17 June 1876, Jargeau, Loiret - 11 January 1956, Paris, France) was a French painter, illustrator, and caricaturist.
