= Battle of Patay =

1429 battle during the Hundred Years' War

- Part of the Hundred Years' War
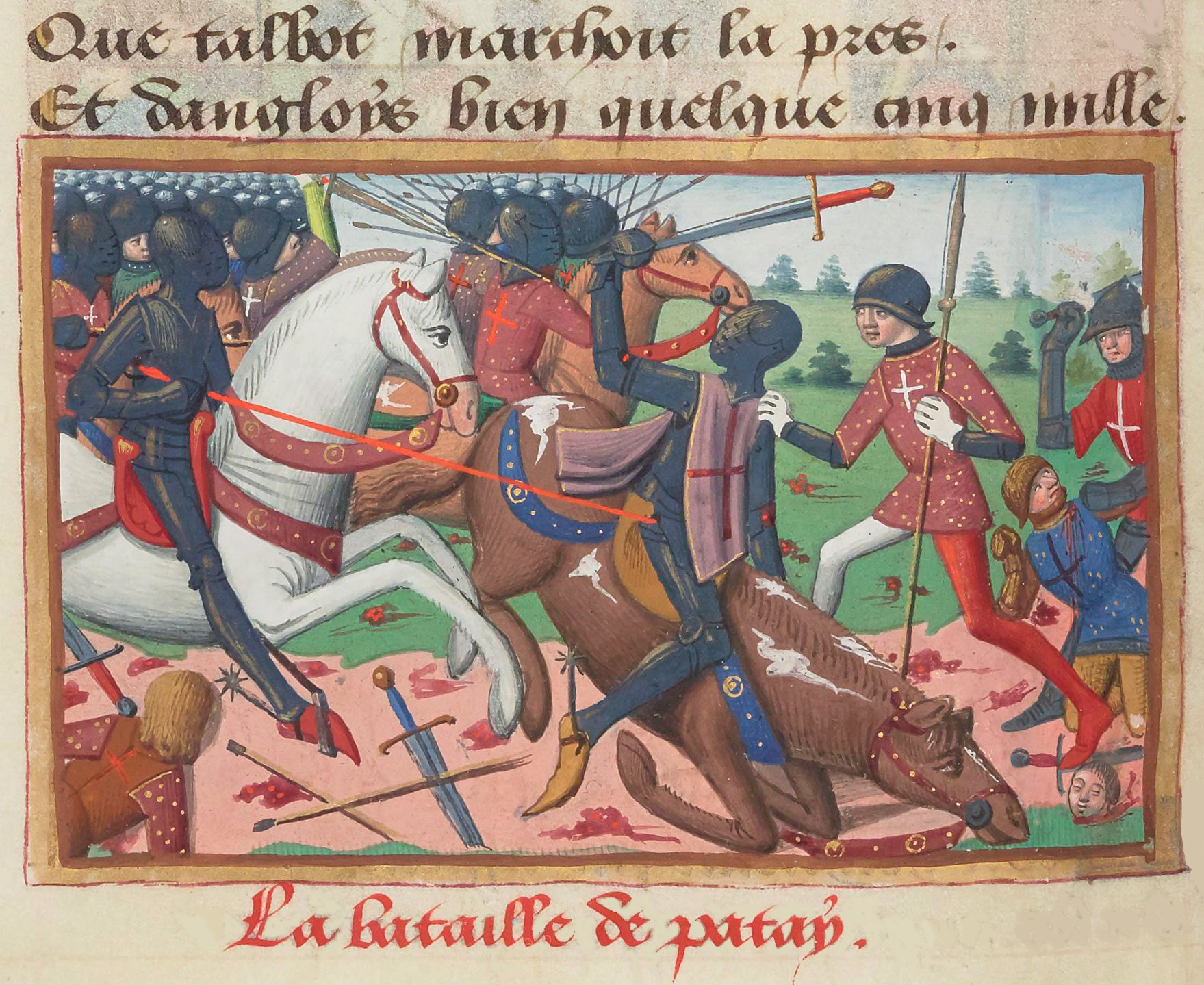
- Battle of Patay
Date	18 June 1429
Location	Near Patay, slightly north of Orléans, France 48.0302°N 1.7049°E
Result	French victory

Belligerents
France; Kingdom of Scotland	England

Commanders and leaders
La Hire; Jean de Xaintrailles; Antoine de Chabannes	John Fastolf; John Talbot (surrendered); Thomas, Baron Scales (surrendered); Thomas Rempston (surrendered)

Strength
180 knights 1,300 men-at-arms	5,000

Casualties and losses
3 killed and 100 wounded	Over 2,000 killed 2,500–4,000 killed or captured

The Battle of Patay, fought on 18 June 1429 during the Hundred Years' War, was the culmination of the Loire Campaign between the French and English in north-central France. In this engagement, the horsemen of the French vanguard inflicted heavy casualties on an English army, most of them sustained by longbowmen as the English cavalry fled. In addition, all but one of the senior English commanders were captured. A victory often credited to Joan of Arc, she was in fact not present for the battle as she had remained with the main body of the French army. The vanguard at Patay was led by La Hire and Jean Poton de Xaintrailles.

The battle was a disastrous blow to English aspirations in France. For the French, it cemented the turn of fortune which had begun at Orléans and concluded a highly successful campaign. The latter was followed by a march to Reims which saw the Dauphin Charles crowned King of France. The Hundred Years' War, however, would continue until 1453.

== Background ==
After the English abandoned the Siege of Orléans on 8 May 1429, the survivors withdrew to garrisons along the Loire. A month later, having gathered men and supplies for the forthcoming campaign, the French army, under the command of the Duke of Alençon, set out to capture these positions and the bridges they controlled. On June 12 they stormed Jargeau, captured the bridge at Meung-sur-Loire, then marched on, without attacking the nearby castle, to besiege Beaugency on 15 June.

An English reinforcement army under Sir John Fastolf, which had set off from Paris following the defeat at Orléans, now joined forces with survivors of the besieging army under Lord Talbot and Lord Scales at Meung-sur-Loire. Talbot urged an immediate attack to relieve Beaugency, but was opposed by the more cautious Fastolf, who was reluctant to seek a pitched battle against the more numerous French. The garrison of Beaugency, unaware of the arrival of Fastolf's reinforcements and discouraged by the reinforcement of the French by a Breton contingent under Arthur de Richemont, surrendered on 18 June. Talbot then agreed to Fastolf's proposal to retreat towards Paris. Learning of this movement, the French set off in pursuit, and intercepted the English army near the village of Patay. (Note: Devries 1999, p. 119 and Burne 1956, p. 257 place the battle on an elevation near the village of Lignerolles about 1.25 miles (2.01 km) south of Patay.)

== Battle ==
In this battle, the English attempted to employ the same methods used in the victories at Crécy in 1346 and Agincourt in 1415, deploying an army composed predominantly of longbowmen behind a barrier of sharpened stakes driven into the ground to obstruct any attack by cavalry. Learning of the French approach, Talbot sent a force of archers to ambush them from a patch of woods along the road, then ordered them to redeploy, setting up 500 longbowmen in a hidden location which would block the main road.

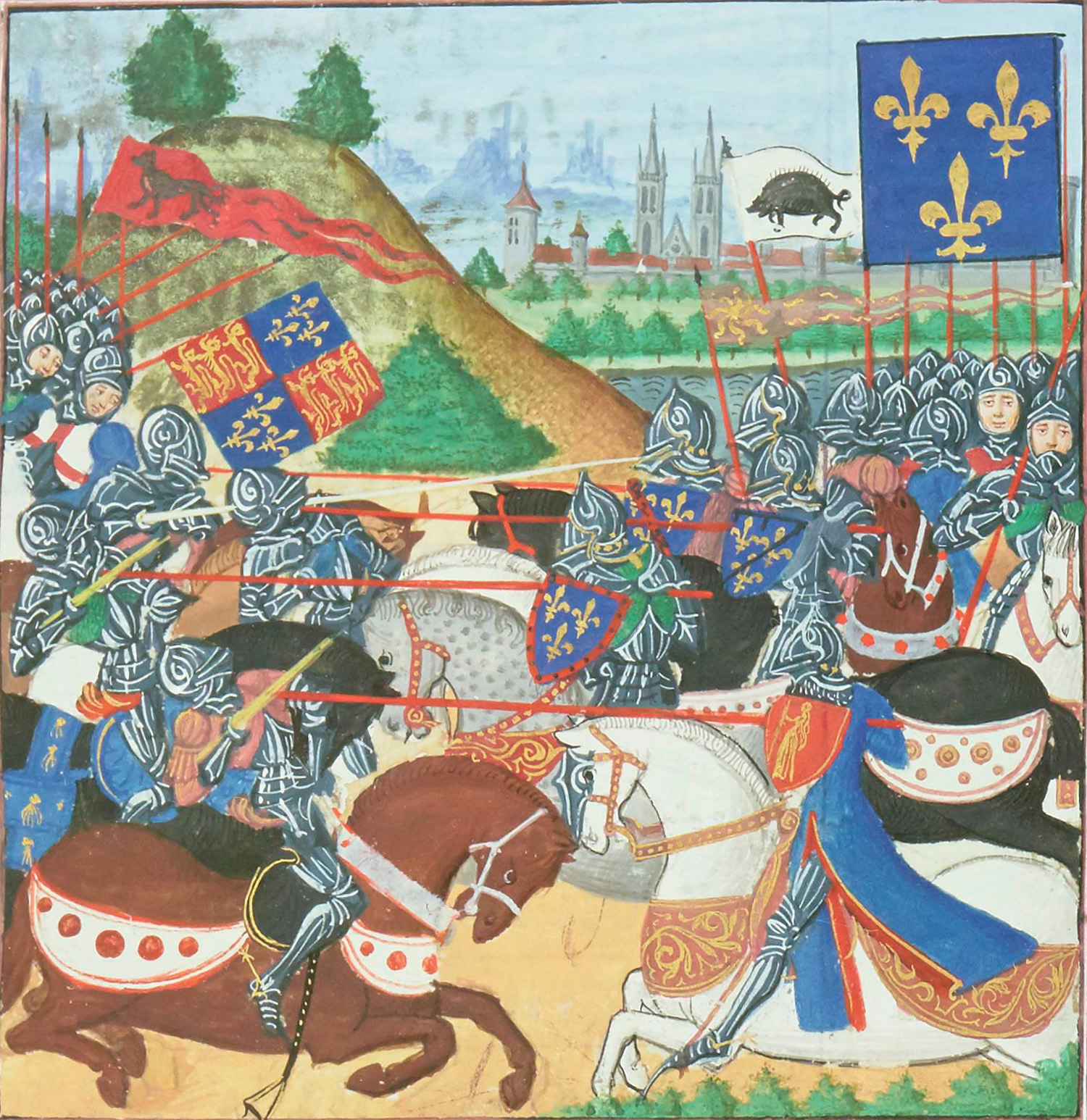
The French and English Clashing; by this stage, the English knights normally fought dismounted.

Though they moved quickly, these English archers were attacked by 180 knights of the French vanguard under La Hire and Xaintrailles before they could finish preparing their new position and were swiftly overwhelmed, leading to the exposure of the other English units, which were spread out along the road. Earlier, the longbowmen had inadvertently disclosed their position to French scouts when a lone stag wandered onto a nearby field and the archers raised a hunting cry, not knowing their enemies were already so close. Learning of this, the French vanguard had raced ahead, soon moving up within sight of them. With the threat of an ambush dealt with by the French knights, some were sent back to inform the men-at-arms of the English predicament.

Opting to not wait for the reinforcements, La Hire, Xaintrailles, and their knightly fellows deployed and charged forward, crashing into the English positions from the now exposed flanks. Meanwhile, having ridden over a ridge south of the English lines, the rest of the French vanguard, consisting of some 1,300 men-at-arms, soon appeared behind the enemy in battle order. At the sight of the French horsemen charging, Fastolf's unit attempted to join up with the mounted knights and men-at-arms who formed the English vanguard but the latter fled the battlefield, forcing Fastolf to follow suit. Outflanked and overrun, the rest of the battle was a prolonged heavy cavalry mopping-up operation against the fleeing English units, with little organized resistance.

Historian Juliet Barker suggests Patay was the most disastrous English defeat since the Battle of Baugé in 1421, and one with more significant consequences since they lost over 2,000 dead out of 5,000, while all of their senior commanders were captured apart from Fastolf, the only one who remained mounted. Grummitt estimates English casualties as 2,500, the bulk of whom were archers, while the French lost only about one hundred men. John Talbot, Scales and Sir Thomas Rempston were captured and, after his release in 1433, Talbot accused Fastolf of deserting his comrades in the face of the enemy. Fastolf hotly denied the charge and was eventually cleared by a special chapter of the Order of the Garter, although his reputation was severely damaged.

== Consequences ==
The virtual destruction of the English field army in central France and the loss of many of their principal veteran commanders (another, the Earl of Suffolk, had been captured in the Battle of Jargeau, while the Earl of Salisbury had been killed at the siege of Orléans in November 1428), had devastating consequences for the English position in France, from which it would never recover. During the following weeks the French, facing negligible resistance, were able to swiftly regain swathes of territory to the south, east and north of Paris, and to march to Reims, where the Dauphin was crowned as King Charles VII of France on 17 July.

== Bibliography ==
- Allmand, Christopher (1988). The Hundred Years War: England and France at War c. 1300–1450. Cambridge: Cambridge University Press. ISBN 0521319234.
- Barker, Juliet (2009). Conquest: The English Kingdom of France (PDF). London: Little, Brown. ISBN 978-1408700839. Archived from the original (PDF) on 2018-06-12.
- Burne, Alfred Higgins (1999) [1956]. The Agincourt War: A Military History of the Latter Part of the Hundred Years War from 1369 to 1453. Wordsworth Editions. ISBN 1840222115. OCLC 1285475585.
- Cooper, Stephen (2010). The Real Falstaff, Sir John Fastolf and the Hundred Years War. Pen & Sword Military. ISBN 978-1848841239.
- Devries, Kelly (1999). Joan of Arc: A Military Leader. Gloucestershire: Sutton Publishing. ISBN 0750918055.
- Green, David (2014). The Hundred Years War: A People's History. Yale University Press.
- Grummitt, David (2010). Rogers, Clifford J. (ed.). The Oxford Encyclopedia of Medieval Warfare and Military Technology. Vol. 3. Oxford University Press. pp. 107–108. ISBN 978-0195334036.
- Leveel, Pierre (2002). "Charles VII, la Touraine et les Etats Generaux". Bulletin de la Société archéologique de Touraine (in French). Société archéologique de Touraine.
- Pernoud, Regine; Clin, Marie-Veronique (1998). Wheeler, Bonnie (ed.). Joan of Arc: Her Story. Translated by Adams, Jeremy duQuesnay. St. Martin's Griffin. ISBN 978-0312214425.
- Richey, Stephen W. (2003). Joan of Arc: The Warrior Saint. Westport, Connecticut: Praeger. ISBN 0275981037.
- Sackville-West, Victoria (2001). Saint Joan of Arc. Grove Press. ISBN 978-1135520441.
- Forbes-Leith, William (1833–1921). The Scots Men-at-Arms and Life-Guards in France, From Their Formation Until Their Final Dissolution, A.D. MCCCCXVIII–MDCCCXXX (Volume I). Edinburgh-William Patterson.
