= Patay, Loiret =

Patay
- Commune
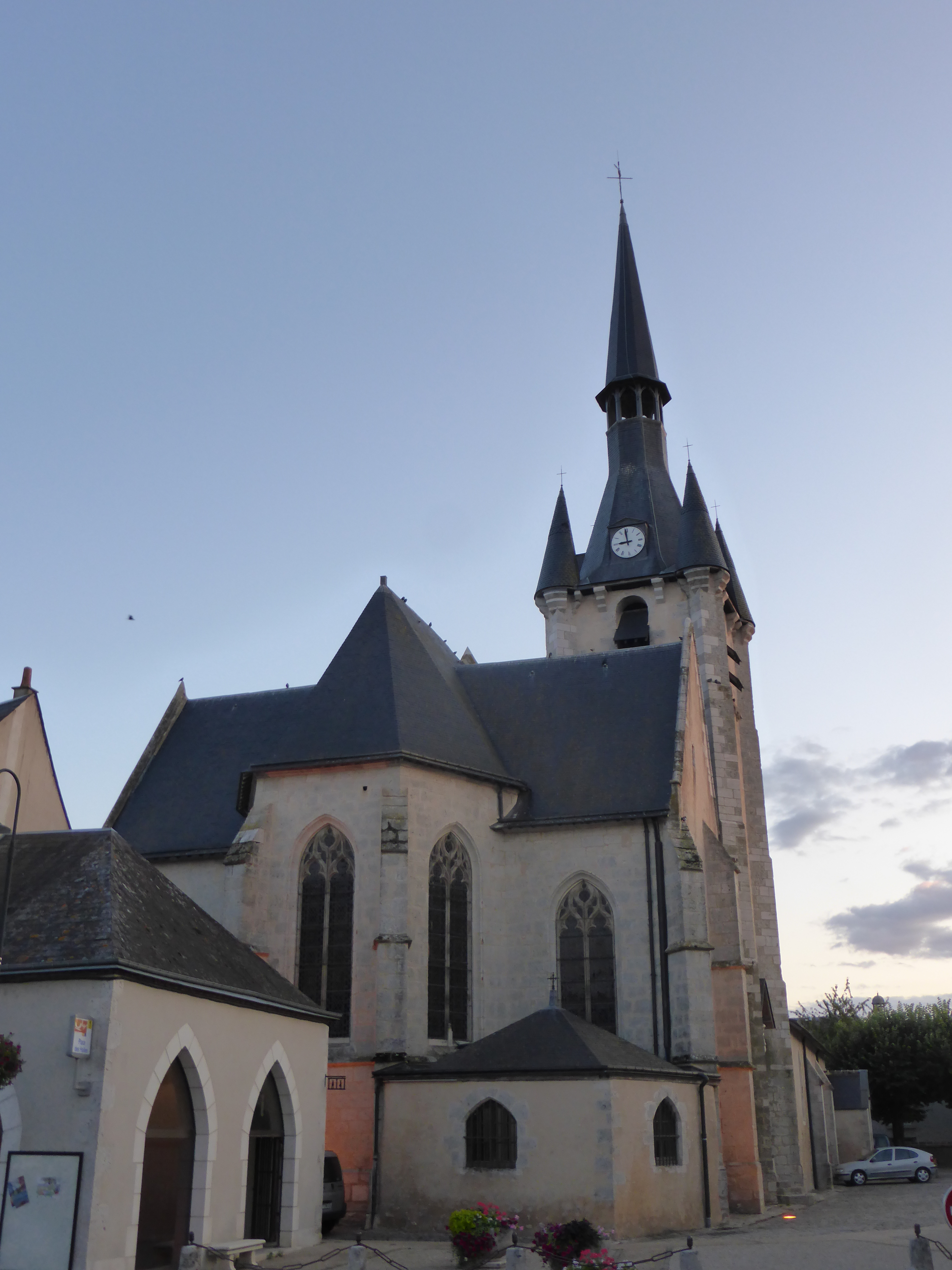
- Saint-André church in Patay

- Coat of arms
- Location of Patay
- Location within France Location within Centre-Val de Loire
- Coordinates: 48°02′54″N 1°41′45″E
- Country: France
- Region: Centre-Val de Loire
- Department: Loiret
- Arrondissement: Orléans
- Canton: Meung-sur-Loire

Government
  - Mayor (2020–2026): Patrice Voisin
- Area^{1}: 13.80 km^{2} (5.33 sq mi)
- Highest elevation: 130 m (430 ft)
- Lowest elevation: 116 m (381 ft)
- Population (2023): 2,384
  - Density: 172.8/km^{2} (447.4/sq mi)
- Demonym: Patichons
- Time zone: UTC+01:00 (CET)
  - Summer (DST): UTC+02:00 (CEST)
- INSEE/Postal code: 45248 /45310
- ^{1} French Land Register data, which excludes lakes, ponds, glaciers > 1 km^{2} (0.386 sq mi or 247 acres) and river estuaries.

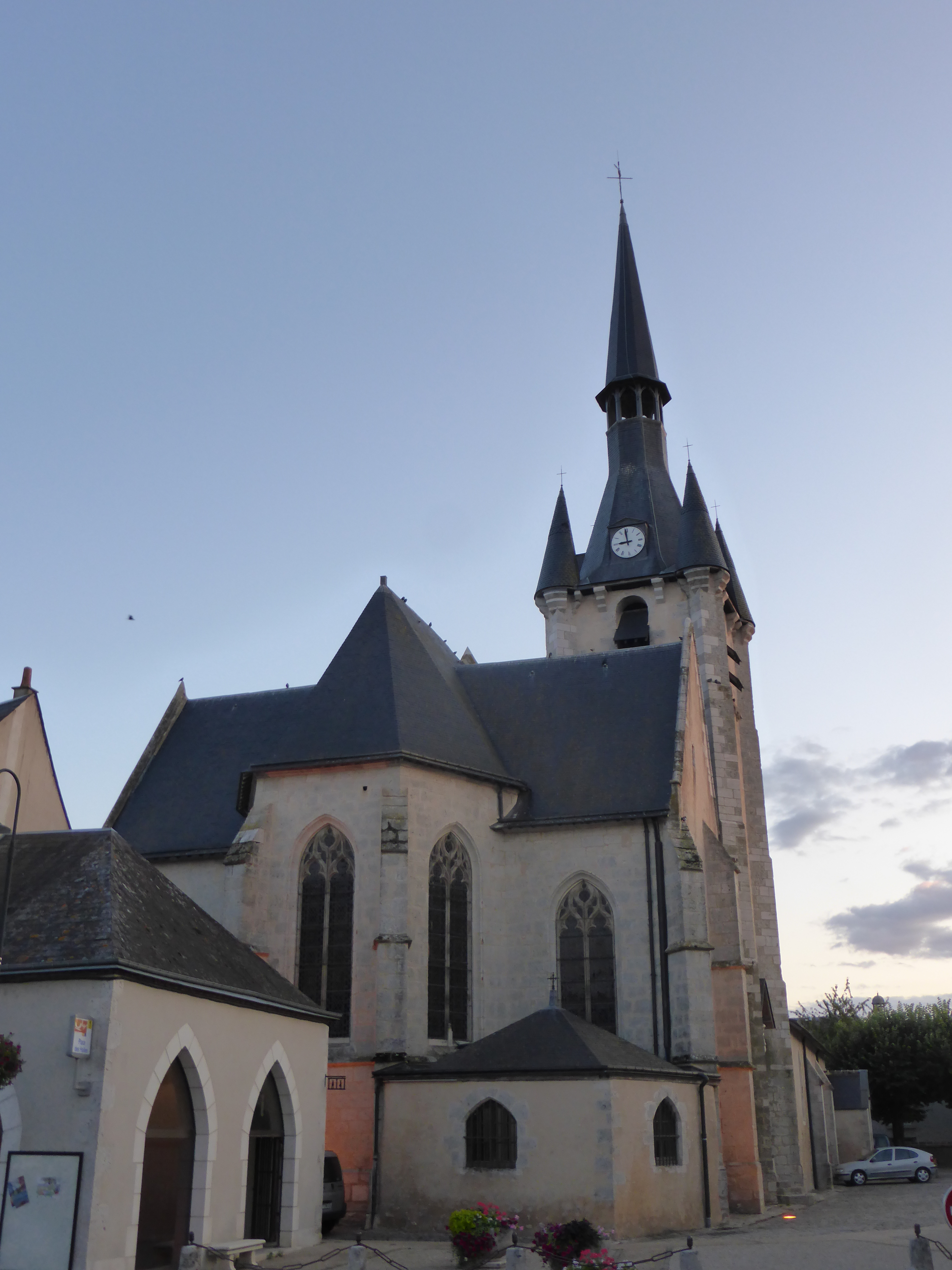
Patay

Patay (French pronunciation: [patɛ]) is a commune in the Loiret department in north-central France.

== Population ==
Historical population
Year	Pop.	±% p.a.
1968	1,920	—
1975	2,038	+0.86%
1982	1,863	−1.27%
1990	1,932	+0.46%
1999	2,027	+0.53%
2007	2,074	+0.29%
2012	2,060	−0.14%
2017	2,190	+1.23%
2023	2,384	+1.42%
Source: INSEE

== History ==
It was the site of the Battle of Patay on 18 June 1429.

== See also ==
- Communes of the Loiret department
- History of the Loiret
