= La Hire =

15th-century French military commander

Étienne de Vignolles
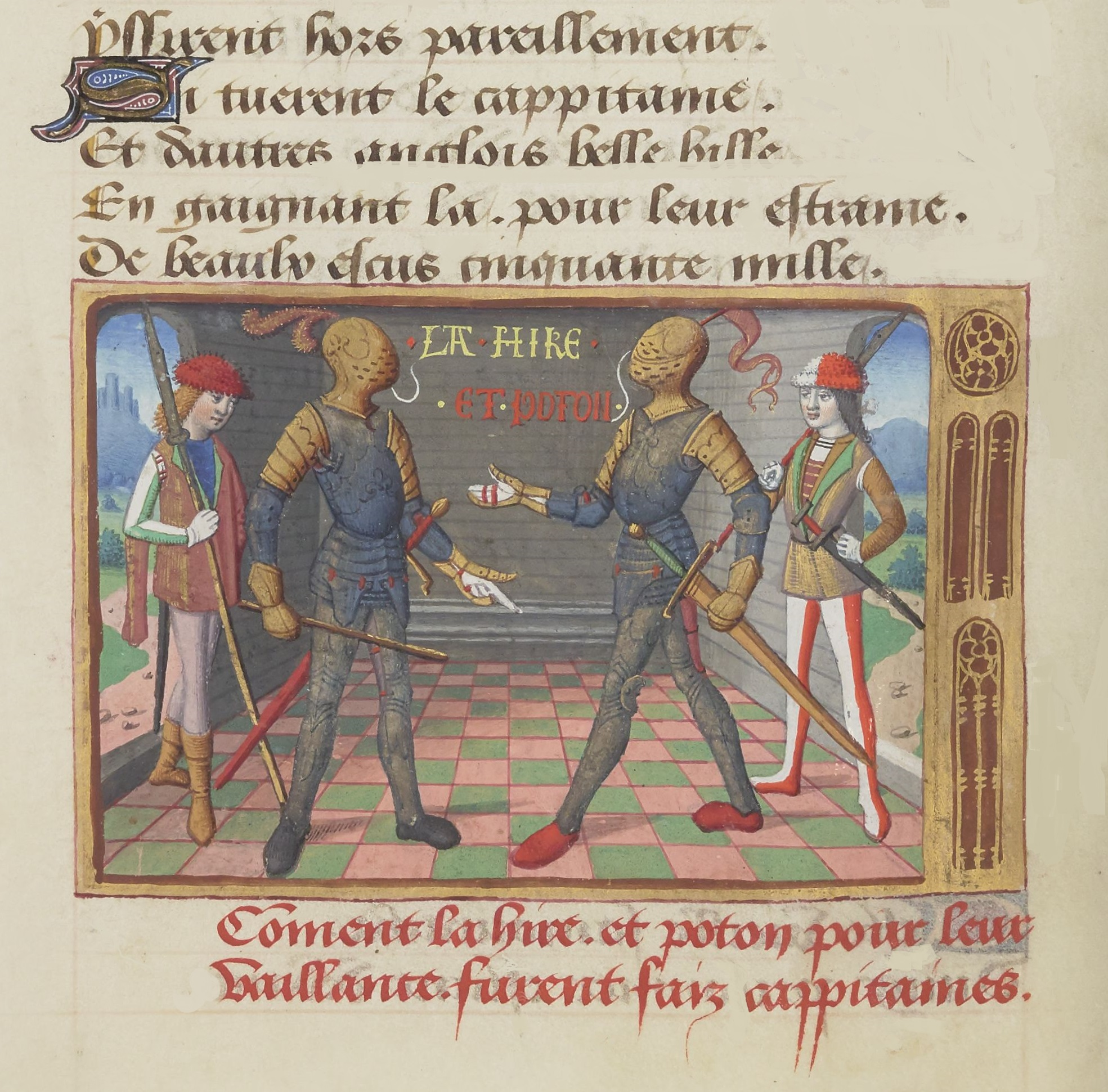
- La Hire and Xaintrailles depicted in a late 15th-century illuminated book.
- Born: 1390; Préchacq-les-Bains, Lordship of Albret
- Died: 11 January 1443 (aged 53); Montauban, Guyenne
- Military career
- Allegiance: Kingdom of France
- Branch: French Army
- Service years: 1418–1443
- Rank: Captain-General
- Nickname: La Hire ("The Wrath")
- Commands: Écorcheurs; County Bailiff of Vermandois; Commander of Château Thierry; Commander of Château de Vitry-la-Ville
- Conflicts: Hundred Years War (Lancastrian phase); Battle of Baugé; Battle of Gerberoy; Loire Campaign; Siege of Orléans; Battle of Jargeau; Battle of Patay; Battle of Meung-sur-Loire; Battle of Beaugency

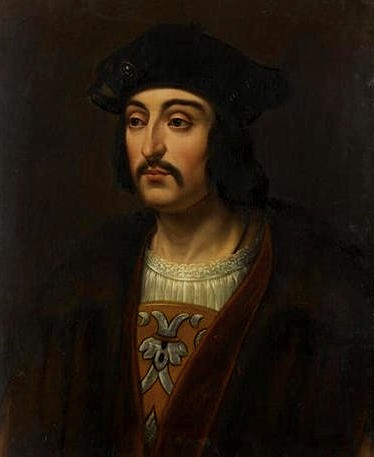
Idealized portrait of La Hire as imagined by Louis-Félix Amiel, 1835.

Coat of arms of Étienne de Vignolles

Étienne de Vignolles, Sieur de Montmorillon, Chatelain de Longueville (French: [etjɛn də viɲɔl]), also known as La Hire ([la iʁ]; 1390 – 11 January 1443), was a French military commander during the Hundred Years' War.

== Nickname ==
One explanation for his nickname of La Hire would be that the English had nicknamed him "the Hire-God," from the Latin Ira Dei, meaning "the wrath of God." Alternatively, his name may simply come from the French "hedgehog" ("hérisson") because he had a prickly disposition.

== Military career ==
La Hire joined Charles VII in 1418, when the English army invaded France. Although not a noble, La Hire was regarded a very capable military leader as well as an accomplished rider. Three years later, in 1421 he fought at the Battle of Baugé. Along with Jean de Dunois, La Hire was involved in scouting and skirmishing in the countryside as far north as Paris. In 1427, both La Hire and Dunois relieved the siege of Montargis. He was a close comrade of Joan of Arc. He was one of the few military leaders who believed in her and the inspiration she brought, and he fought alongside her at Orleans. At the Battle of Patay, La Hire commanded the vanguard and won a great victory for France. La Hire was also known for praying before going into battle, something that could be attributed to Joan's influence. In 1430, La Hire captured the English held fortification of Château Gaillard. He was imprisoned in Dourdan in the spring of 1431. He won the Battle of Gerberoy in 1435 and was made Captain General of Normandy in 1438. His last two major military engagements occurred in 1440 at Pontoise where he assisted Dunois to capture it from the English; and in 1442 he assisted Charles of Orléans in capturing La Réole. He died at Montauban on 11 January 1443, of an unknown illness.

== In popular culture ==
In French tradition, "La Hire" is used as a nickname for the knave of hearts.
His name remains a byword for a choleric disposition.

=== Literature ===
La Hire is a minor figure in the "Catherine" novels of Juliette Benzoni. He also features prominently in Mark Twain’s “Personal Recollections of Joan of Arc” as a ferocious fighter and Joan of Arc’s most valuable general.

=== Film, theatre and TV ===
In Cecil B. DeMille's film Joan the Woman, La Hire was played by Hobart Bosworth. In the French film La Merveilleuse Vie de Jeanne d'Arc (1929), he was played by Fernand Mailly.

La Hire was also played by veteran John Ford "stock company" member Ward Bond in Victor Fleming's classic 1948 Technicolor film Joan of Arc, which starred Ingrid Bergman.

In Otto Preminger's 1957 version of Saint Joan, La Hire was portrayed by Patrick Barr.

On British television, in the BBC's Play of the Month (1968) version of Saint Joan, La Hire was portrayed by Jack Watson. In the USA, Hallmark Hall of Fame did two versions of the story - The Lark (1957), La Hire being played by Bruce Gordon, and Saint Joan (1967), in which the character was played by Dana Elcar.

In the two-part French film Jeanne la Pucelle (1994), La Hire was portrayed by Stephane Boucher. In the television miniseries Joan of Arc (1999), La Hire was played by Peter Strauss. Also in 1999, La Hire appeared in the feature film The Messenger: The Story of Joan of Arc, portrayed by actor Richard Ridings.

In the Czech musical Johanka z Arku (2003), La Hire was portrayed by Petr Kolář and Kamil Střihavka.

=== Computer games ===
La Hire appears in Age of Empires II (1999) in the Joan of Arc campaign. A powerful "Champion"-class infantry unit, he is portrayed as an accomplished and capable yet Hulk-like brute that refers to himself in the third person. His remarks include "La Hire wishes to kill something", "The blood on La Hire's sword is almost dry", and "La Hire's sword is not bloody enough!".

La Hire is featured as a character in the tactical roleplaying video game Jeanne d'Arc (2005). In the game, La Hire is depicted as an axe-wielding lion beastman warrior and mercenary, known for his overwhelming strength and a fiery temperament.

In Wars and Warriors: Joan of Arc (2004), La Hire is a playable character who is portrayed as a giant with stunning strength. He fights with a massive club.

In Armored Core: For Answer (2008), one of the featured mechs is designated TYPE-LAHIRE. La Hire is also a character in Koei's Bladestorm: The Hundred Years' War (2015).

La Hire has a less than significant appearance in Age of Empires IV (2021) during the "Battle of Patay" mission of the Hundred Years War campaign. He does not appear physically, in fact his only depiction in the game is his name, but players can hire squads of Royal Knights from him during the mission.

The character Henri Le Massif in the Total War: Warhammer series of games, and the Warhammer tabletop-game version of this character, are based on La Hire.

== See also ==
- Siege of Orléans
- Battle of Jargeau
- Battle of Meung-sur-Loire
- Battle of Beaugency
