= Hundred Years' War, 1415–1453 =

Third phase of the Hundred Years' War

Lancastrian War (1415–1453)
- Part of the Hundred Years' War
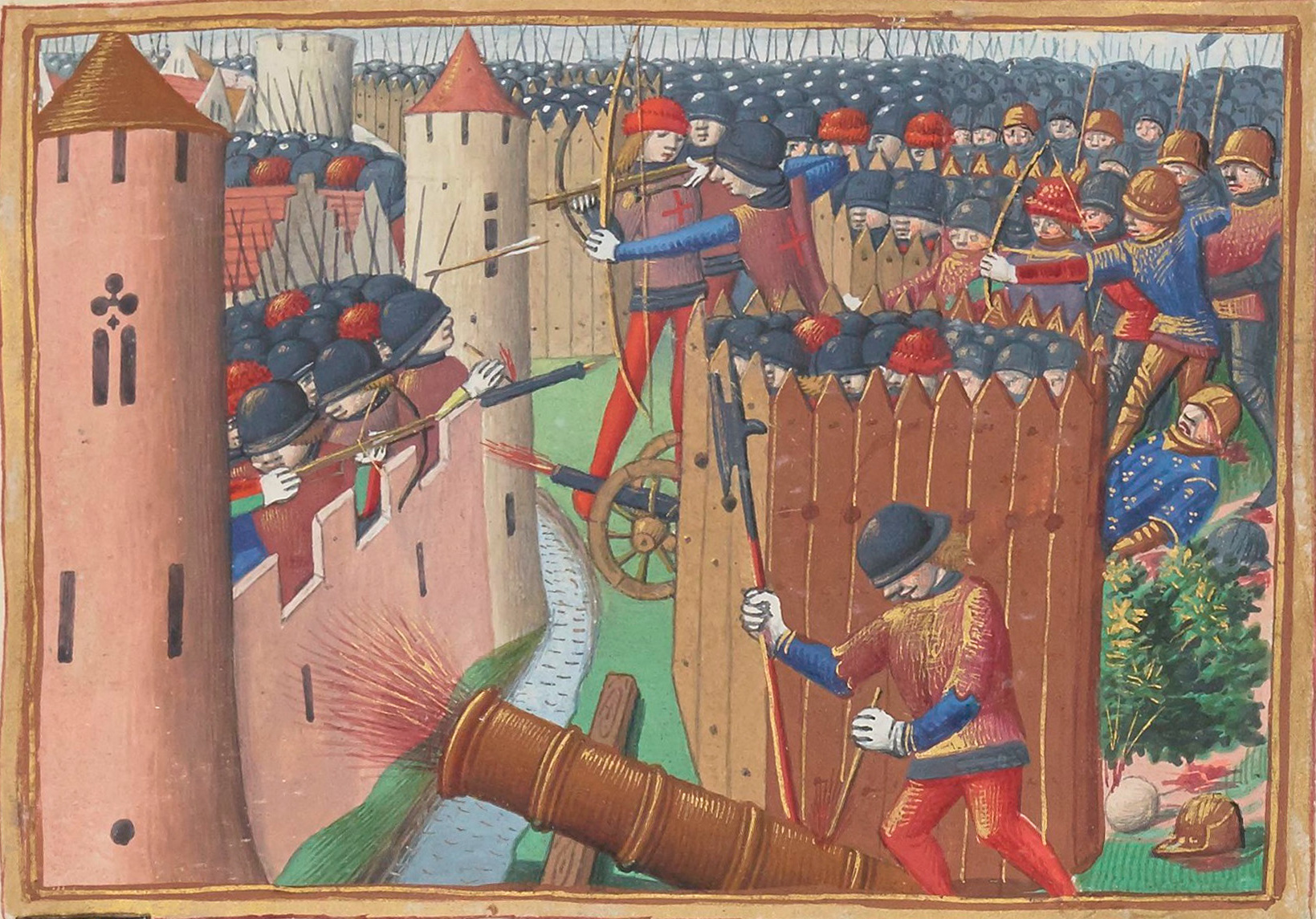
- The Siege of Orléans in 1429 (Martial d'Auvergne, 1493)
Date	13 August 1415 – 19 October 1453
Location	France
Result	French victory: End of the Hundred Years' War
Territorial changes	England loses all continental territory aside from Pale of Calais

Belligerents
Kingdom of France: Armagnac party; Duchy of Burgundy (1435 to 1453); Kingdom of Scotland	Kingdom of England: Principality of Wales; English Kingdom of France; Duchy of Burgundy (1419 to 1435)

Commanders and leaders
Charles VI #; Charles VII; Joan of Arc (executed); Louis, Dauphin; Arthur de Richemont; Jean de Dunois; La Hire #; Jean de Xaintrailles; Jean d'Alençon; Charles de Bourbon; Ambroise de Loré #; Jean de Brosse #; Jean Bureau; Gilbert de Lafayette; Gilles de Rais (executed); Charles d'Albret †; Jean Le Maingre (surrendered) #; Charles d'Orléans (surrendered); John Stewart †; Archibald Douglas †; John of Darnley †; Philip the Good	Henry V #; Henry VI & II (Note: In accordance with the Treaty of Troyes, Henry VI of England became disputed king of France in 1422, and reigned as Henry II in the areas of France which were loyal to him.); John of Lancaster #; Thomas Montagu †; John Talbot (surrendered) †; Thomas of Lancaster †; Thomas Beaufort #; Humphrey of Lancaster #; Edward of York †; Richard of York; Richard Beauchamp #; Thomas de Scales (surrendered); Thomas Rempston (surrendered); William de la Pole (executed); John Beaufort #; Edmund Beaufort (surrendered); John Fastolf; Philip the Good; Jean of Luxembourg #

The Lancastrian War was the third and final phase of the Hundred Years' War between England and France. It lasted from 1415, when Henry V of England invaded Normandy, to 1453, when the English were definitively defeated in Aquitaine. It followed a long period of peace from the end of the Caroline War in 1389. The phase is named after the House of Lancaster, the ruling house of the Kingdom of England, to which Henry V belonged. The early years of the Lancastrian War were dominated by the forces of the House of Plantagenet, who held the English throne and also claimed that of France. Initial English successes, notably at the Battle of Agincourt, coupled with divisions among the French ruling class, allowed Henry V to win the allegiance of large parts of France. Under the terms of the Treaty of Troyes of 1420, Henry V married the French princess Catherine of Valois and was made regent of the kingdom and heir to the throne of France. A victory on paper was thus achieved by the English, with their claims now having legal standing. Some of the French nobility refused to recognise the agreement, however, and so military conflict continued. Henry V and, after his death, his brother John, Duke of Bedford, brought the English to the height of their power in France, with a Plantagenet crowned in Paris.

The second half of this phase of the war was dominated by forces loyal to the House of Valois, the French-born rivals of the Plantagenets who continued to claim the throne of France themselves. Beginning in 1429, French forces counterattacked, inspired by Joan of Arc, La Hire and the Count of Dunois, and aided by a reconciliation with the Dukes of Burgundy and Brittany, who had previously sided with the Plantagenets. Charles VII was crowned in Notre-Dame de Reims in 1429, and from then a slow but steady reconquest of English-held French territories ensued. Ultimately the English would be expelled from France, except for the Pale of Calais, which would be re-captured by the French a century later. The Battle of Castillon (1453) was the final major engagement of the Hundred Years' War, but France and England remained formally at war until the Treaty of Picquigny in 1475. English, and later British, monarchs would continue to nominally claim the French throne until 1802 though they would never again seriously pursue it.

== Background ==
In England, King Henry IV’s reign was nearing its end, marked by chronic ill health and mounting political challenges. His authority was increasingly undermined by both his failing health and growing disputes among the English nobility, including tensions with his own son, Henry of Monmouth, the future Henry V. Domestically, England was still dealing with the lingering aftereffects of the Welsh revolt led by Owain Glyndŵr, which had largely been contained by this time, though pockets of resistance remained. Rebellion and unrest among the English aristocracy persisted, fueled by dissatisfaction with the king's leadership and disputes over royal policy and succession. The king's deteriorating condition meant that Prince Henry took a more active role in government, at times even coming into open conflict with his father and the king's closest advisers.

Meanwhile, in France, the situation was even more precarious. King Charles VI continued to suffer from periods of insanity, leaving the country effectively leaderless and vulnerable. The previous decades had seen intermittent truces, dynastic disputes, and shifting alliances, but no lasting settlement to the Franco-English conflict over the French crown and territorial rights. After his father's death in 1413, Henry V assumed the throne, establishing a relatively stable political scene with a well-defined council and parliament. Trade was thriving and the country prospered. France's confrontation with England over Aquitaine had quieted due to the civil war between the Armagnacs and Burgundians. English armies were solicited for help in France, and the northern border had been quiet since the capture of James I in 1406. In this advantageous context, Henry V promptly announced his intention to assert his 'legitimate inheritance,' the crown of France.

== England resumes the war ==
The Peace of Auxerre between the Armagnacs and the Burgundians in 1412 weakened the English's hopes of concessions, and Clarence's expedition in 1412 further cemented the Armagnacs' control of Paris. However, riots in 1413 forced John the Fearless, Duke of Burgundy to flee, leading to civil war and the Armagnacs regaining control of Paris and the government. The civil war continued through Picardy and Flanders until August 1414, when a peace agreement was reached in Arras. Both sides made overtures to Henry, hoping to enlist his help in their quarrel. Henry was content to keep them both dangling, and even suggested marrying Jean's daughter to settle the French quarrel. In January 1414, a truce was arranged between Henry and the Armagnac government in Paris to continue negotiations over Henry's claims, including the hand of Charles VI's daughter, Catherine, and a colossal dowry of a million crowns. The Armagnacs were willing to meet Henry's other demands but were not prepared to provide such a large dowry. Henry wanted war as soon as possible while the French were distracted by internal troubles. The truce was extended to August 1415, but it was merely a smoke screen for Henry's preparations.

Henry V aimed to leave a contented country behind when he ventured abroad, requiring the nobility's support. However, disaffected barons from his father's reign were vulnerable to exploiting his absence. These peers or families had been dishonoured by Henry's father when he usurped the throne from Richard II. Upon his accession, Henry V made a generous gesture to these people, ensuring their support for regaining their inheritance and not seizing the throne. He restored lands and titles to several key nobles, including the Earl of March, the grandson of the late Earl of Northumberland, and Thomas Holland. He also removed the stigma against the House of York, winning the loyalty of the Duke of York. To further solidify his rule, he elevated his own brothers, John and Humphrey, to dukedoms and made Richard Langley the Earl of Cambridge. Finally, to put the past behind him, he had the body of Richard II reburied at Westminster. Henry also aimed to leave Scotland's border secured before attacking France, holding Murdoch and James I captive, renewing the 1414 truce, and strengthening marcher castle garrisons.

=== Preparation ===
A public pronouncement regarding a potential expedition was made at Parliament in November 1414. While the lords and commons advised that there should be further negotiations with the French, they agreed that preparations for the king's expedition should be undertaken in the meantime."With whatever retinue he wished to appoint," the lay peers informed the king, they were willing to serve on his mission. It was evident from Henry's suggestions on indentures during this period that he meant for the campaign to go for at least nine months. Wages for the first quarter would be paid prior to the start of the quarter (a year was split into four periods of ninety-one days, or roughly three months). The end of the second quarter would mark the issuance of the second and third quarter pay.

The king couldn't fully prepare for war due to parliament's desire for peace negotiations. However, strategic planning on sea defense, English frontiers, and Calais was conducted in mid-February, involving experienced military men like the Duke of York, Earl of Dorset, Henry, Lord Scrope, and Sir Thomas Erpingham. However, when it was publicly known that negotiations with France had failed, military preparations for the raising of a large army moved on apace. By 1 July Henry had assembled an army of 10, 000 to 12, 000 men near Southampton.

== Invasion ==
The French government had known for a long time that an invasion was imminent. However, Henry worked hard to keep its destination a secret. It was not to be Aquitaine, however, as the French government was not to be duped. They remembered that the same idea had been proposed by Edward III. Furthermore, his battles had demonstrated the risks associated with such an amphibious assault. Instead, there was a distinct indication of France's north coast. It could be Brittany, as English soldiers have historically preferred to land at Brest and St. Malo. Or the English monarch might follow in his ancestor's footsteps and settle close to Cherbourg. Feeling threatened, Harfleur, on the Seine estuary, quickly fortified its defenses. Some even preferred Flanders. However, the French government thought that the real invasion location was Boulogne. However, the defense-related actions were mediocre.

The Orleanists and Burgundians were divided over the call for help, with the Orleanists being lethargic and the Burgundians refusing to respond. Louis, the 19-year-old Dauphin, was appointed commander-in-chief and the Constable of France, Charles d'Albret, as his lieutenant. D'Albret collected an army at Rouen and stationed 1,500 men at Honfleur. However, the country was more concerned with heavy taxation than the invasion. The prospects for invasion were heightened when the English armada disappeared south of Bembridge. Henry V was more concerned with recovering Normandy than succouring Aquitaine. Normandy was the older patrimony of the two and had been in Anglo-Norman hands for over a century. Henry resolved to rectify the omission in the Treaty of Bretigny and made it his first objective.

Henry V, a young king, likely studied the successful campaigns of his great-grandfather and generals, particularly Henry of Lancaster and John of Gaunt. He learned from the previous wars and learned four key lessons: maintaining a successful war in distant Aquitaine, overcoming difficulties in maintaining operations on exterior lines due to communication shortcomings, occupying hostile territory with castles and fortified towns, and the importance of a firmly established base in France. The French were situated in Interior Lines, making it easier for the French to mass a large army on its borders. Additionally, France's castles and fortified towns made it nearly impossible to occupy hostile territory without a siege train. These lessons highlight the importance of a well-established base in France for successful operations. In light of these lessons and his personal desire to regain the old duchy of Normandy, he headed for the Seine estuary with Harfleur, on the north side, traditionally considered "the key to Normandy".

=== Harfleur ===
The town of Harfleur, under the command of Jean d’Estouteville, was strongly fortified and well-manned by French defenders. From the outset, Henry enforced strict discipline among his troops through a campaign ordinance that forbade looting, burning, and molesting of civilians, permitting only foraging for horses and punishing any violations with hanging. The siege of Harfleur formally began on August 18, 1415, once the town was completely isolated, and the English commenced systematic bombardment using heavy artillery while constructing siege works to encircle the town.

Despite the overwhelming strength of the English army, Henry's siege engineers did not expect a swift victory. Their concerns proved valid as early attempts to mine beneath the walls and drive trenches up to the fortifications were thwarted by flooded ditches and vigorous French countermining efforts. As a result, the English were forced to place greater reliance on their artillery barrage. This included not only gunpowder artillery but also traditional stone-throwing engines. The cast-iron guns, notable for their deafening noise and ability to hurl massive projectiles—sometimes weighing up to a quarter of a ton—were especially intimidating. Many of the stone balls were also converted into incendiaries by adding burning tar, causing further devastation within the town.

Nevertheless, the geography of Harfleur, which allowed defenders to overlook the besiegers, and frequent, determined sallies made the English artillery's task difficult. English casualties mounted due to the long-range fire of French guns and crossbows, as well as the aggressive sorties from the garrison. Despite the fierce resistance, the extended siege and continuous assault inflicted severe hardship on both the inhabitants and defenders of Harfleur. Disease, particularly dysentery, ravaged both sides, further weakening their capacity to fight. After several weeks of bombardment and repeated summons to surrender, the exhausted defenders, recognizing the hopelessness of their situation, capitulated on September 22, 1415.

=== Road to Agincourt ===
Henry V had four options to choose from: return to England, march to Bordeaux, march to Calais, or march to Rouen and Paris. He could stay at Harfleur and await reinforcements, but this was discarded due to the unhealthy air of the estuary. Paris was too risky, as it would face forces from Armagnac France and Burgundy, which would likely bring warring factions to oppose him. Bordeaux was too far away, and returning home by ship would be seen as weakness by the French and parliament. Henry sent a herald to the Dauphin at Rouen, challenging him to duel. After eight days, no reply was received, and Henry marched to Calais, leaving a strong garrison at Harfleur. Reinforcements had been received and so, notwithstanding many desertions, Henry was able to set off with an army of between six and seven thousand men on 6 October. They took with them barely sufficient rations for the next eight days, the time Henry reckoned it would take him to march to Calais.

The French actions before and reactions to Henry V's invasion were hesitant and dilatory. They knew about Henry's invasion preparations but intended to defeat him in one glorious battle. They initially planned to concentrate their army at Rouen, a strategically sensible place to bar any advance by Henry towards Paris or north to Calais. However, by the time Harfleur had fallen and Henry was on his way to Calais, the senior commanders gathered at Rouen to discuss the strategy of their campaign and decide on their future moves. They ordered the army to muster at Abbeville, where they could bar Henry's march to Calais. Henry realized that the French had no intention of fighting him south of the Somme, but likely intended to defeat him while crossing the river or keep him south until his army starved.

The English left Harfleur without any equipment and marched in three columns, burning and looting along the coast towards the Somme. Henry arrived opposite Abbeville on the evening of 13 October only to find the bridges destroyed and the French army in force on the opposite bank. His army was now in a difficult position: they were unable to cross the Somme at Abbeville and a withdrawal to Harfleur would look cowardly. But Henry decided to press on. On 14 October the main body of Henry's army passed about 3 miles to the south of Amiens, still following the river upstream. On 24 October the English reached the River Ternoise.

=== Agincourt ===
On 25 October 1415, the English and French armies faced each other near Agincourt. The English force, led by Henry V, numbered around 6,000 men, primarily longbowmen supported by a smaller contingent of men-at-arms, and was deployed in a narrow line with archers positioned on the flanks, protected by sharpened stakes. Opposite them, the French arrayed a far larger army, estimated by contemporary sources at between 20,000 and 30,000 men, organized in three divisions: the advance guard, center, and rearguard. The French front line, commanded by Constable d’Albret and Marshal Boucicault, consisted largely of men-at-arms, supported by flanking cavalry and some archers and crossbowmen, though these missile troops were largely pushed aside by the nobility eager to lead the assault.

The battlefield itself was hemmed in by woods on both sides and rendered muddy by recent rains, conditions that would later play a crucial role. The French plan called for coordinated attacks by cavalry on the English flanks, but these charges were poorly executed and hampered by the terrain and English defenses. The main body of French men-at-arms then advanced across the churned, sodden field under a barrage of English arrows. Pressed tightly together and exhausted by their advance, the French found themselves unable to break the English line. The English archers, after unleashing volleys of arrows, joined in the hand-to-hand fighting, using swords and mallets to exploit the confusion and fatigue among the French. The first and second French divisions collapsed under the pressure, with many of their leaders killed or captured. The third division failed to intervene decisively, and some of its knights fled the field. The result was a crushing French defeat, with many nobles among the dead and captured, while the English, though greatly outnumbered and exhausted, held the field.

After the battle the exhausted English army did not attempt to pursue the retreating French forces. Instead, Henry V ordered his troops to march toward the English-held port of Calais. The journey to Calais took about four days. On their arrival, the English army was finally able to rest and resupply. Henry V was keen to return home to celebrate his triumph and secure his political position. He arranged for a fleet of ships to transport his army back to England. On November 16, Henry V left France.Notable leaders of the Armagnac faction, such as Charles, Duke of Orléans, John I, Duke of Bourbon, and Arthur de Richemont (brother of the Duke of Brittany), became prisoners in England. The Burgundians, under John the Fearless, Duke of Burgundy, had conserved their forces, not having fought at Agincourt, but the duke's younger brothers — Anthony, Duke of Brabant and Philip II, Count of Nevers — died at that battle.

== The second English invasion of France (1417–1420) ==
With the Armagnac faction in disarray after the defeat at Agincourt, the Burgundians saw an opportunity to seize control of the French government. John the Fearless continued his attempts to gain influence in Paris, which was controlled by the Armagnacs under the leadership of Bernard VII, Count of Armagnac. Seeing no chance of coming to terms with Charles VI and the Armagnacs John resumed negoations with the English. He met Henry on 6 October 1416 in Calais where he promised support for a new campaign; at first secretly and later openly once Henry V had conquered a sizeable portion of the country.

Henry V soon came to the conclusion that raids and chevauchées would not be enough to achieve his main goal the recovery of the old dominion of Aquitaine and the duchy of Normandy. In August 1416 he began to prepare of another invasion. By April 15, 1417, 11,000 troops had assembled at Southampton and on 30 July the whole army was aboard the ship and ready to set out for the conquest of Normandy. However, not everyone on board knew where they were going. The king had, like with Edward III, kept his destination a secret. There was even more mystery in France; although it had long been known that an invasion was coming, the most outrageous theories were put up regarding the landing site. The majority of the harbors along the Channel coast were attempted to be protected, but the defense was inevitably dispersed and ineffective everywhere. The most popular guess was Harfleur, followed by the Boulogne region. On 1 August 1417, King Henry V landed with his army at the mouth of the River Touques, near the town of Trouville on the coast of Normandy. The English army, well-organized and supplied, systematically besieged and captured key Norman towns, including Caen (September 1417), Alençon and Le Mans (March 1418). The fall of Rouen in January 1419 effectively gave the English control over all of Normandy.

=== Treaty of Troyes ===
The political landscape dramatically shifted with the assassination of John the Fearless, Duke of Burgundy, in September 1419, for which the Armagnacs were blamed. The new Duke, Philip the Good, aligned with the English. In May 1420, the Treaty of Troyes was signed between Charles VI of France, Henry V of England, and Philip the Good. The treaty recognized Henry V as regent and heir to the French throne, disinheriting Charles VII, the Dauphin. To further solidify the alliance, Henry V married Catherine of Valois, daughter of Charles VI. The treaty effectively divided France: the north and west under Anglo-Burgundian control, while the south remained loyal to the Dauphin.

== Anglo-Burgundian pressure ==
Following the Treaty of Troyes, English and Burgundian forces consolidated their rule over northern France. Henry V continued military campaigns to subdue the remaining opposition, capturing Melun in November 1420. At the end of his life, Henry V's forces and their Burgundian allies controlled most of northern France, while other regions remained loyal to the Valois claimant, the Dauphin Charles. After the nearly simultaneous deaths of Henry V and King Charles VI of France in 1422, the infant Henry VI was proclaimed king of both England and France.

Only the memories of those directly engaged and the stories of a few chroniclers preserve the oral instructions Henry delivered on his deathbed, but it is quite likely that Henry gave the Duke of Gloucester power in England while his son was still a minor. The Duke of Bedford had power as a Lieutenant in Normandy, and it seems that Henry asked Burgundy to serve as Regent in France until Charles's passing. Bedford took over the regency once Burgundy gave it up following Charles' death on October 21, 1422. However, the Armagnac faction refused to recognize him and remained loyal to Charles VI's son, the Dauphin Charles, who established his court in Bourges. With the Anglo-Burgundian alliance consolidating its grip on northern France, the English, under the regency of the Duke of Bedford, aimed to fully subdue the realm and eliminate remaining French and Scottish resistance. This determination was evident in a series of major military engagements. In 1423, at the Battle of Cravant, an Anglo-Burgundian army decisively defeated a combined Franco-Scottish force on the banks of the Yonne River, severely weakening French influence in the Loire Valley.

The following year, the Duke of Bedford won a major victory at the Battle of Verneuil in 1424, an engagement sometimes called a "second Agincourt," where his forces destroyed a Franco-Scottish army of some 16,000 men. After Verneuil, no large Scottish force would again enter France. Over the next five years, English power in France reached its peak, with territory stretching from the English Channel to the Loire—excluding only Orléans and Angers—and from Brittany in the west to Burgundy in the east. This impressive expansion was achieved even as English resources and manpower were increasingly stretched thin, due to the need to garrison and administer the newly conquered lands.

== Joan of Arc (1429–1431) ==
1415–1429 Controlled by Henry VI of England Controlled by Philip III of Burgundy Controlled by Charles VII of France ★ Main battles --- Battle of Agincourt, 1415 --- Journey to Chinon, 1429 --- March to Reims, 1429

In October 1428, the English army laid siege to the city of Orléans. The English, under Thomas Montacute, Earl of Salisbury, aimed to capture the city and thereby open the way for a decisive thrust into central France. The defenders, led by Jean de Dunois and other loyal commanders, withstood repeated attacks and bombardments despite being cut off on most sides. In November 1428, Salisbury was fatally wounded by artillery fire, and command passed to William de la Pole, Duke of Suffolk. English forces constructed a series of forts and bastilles around Orléans to blockade supplies and reinforcements, but they struggled to maintain a complete encirclement. French morale was low, and the prospect of losing Orléans threatened the very survival of Charles VII's cause.

It was in this desperate context that in late April 1429 Jeanne d’Arc emerged. A peasant girl from Domrémy, she claimed to receive visions from saints directing her to support Charles VII and lift the siege of Orléans. Skeptical at first, Charles and his advisors eventually allowed her to lead a relief force after she underwent theological examination at Poitiers. Jeanne arrived at Orléans in late April 1429, bringing supplies and reinforcements, and quickly became a symbol of hope and divine favor. Adopting an aggressive stance, Jeanne participated in and inspired several direct assaults on the English fortifications, particularly the Tourelles and the bastille of Saint Loup. On 7 May 1429, despite being wounded, Jeanne rallied the troops for a final attack that led to the capture of the Tourelles and the retreat of the English the following day. The lifting of the siege was a turning point: Jeanne's presence revitalized French morale, enabled further military successes along the Loire, and paved the way for Charles VII's coronation at Reims, restoring royal legitimacy and momentum to the French cause.

=== The coronation of Charles VII and the capture of Jeanne d’Arc ===
Following these victories, Jeanne d’Arc insisted that Charles VII proceed to Reims, the traditional site for the coronation of French kings. Despite the city being deep in enemy territory, Jeanne's army escorted Charles across northern France. On 17 July 1429, Charles VII was crowned at Reims Cathedral, an event which greatly boosted his legitimacy. However, the momentum soon faltered. Jeanne led several campaigns in 1430, including a failed attempt to liberate Paris. On 23 May 1430, she was captured by Burgundian troops during the defense of Compiègne. The Burgundians sold her to the English, who put her on trial for heresy at Rouen. After a lengthy and politically motivated trial, Jeanne was condemned and burned at the stake on 30 May 1431.

== Turning point: the loss of Burgundy and the French revival (1431–1444) ==
Despite the execution of Jeanne d’Arc, her impact on French morale and the legitimacy of Charles VII endured. The English continued to hold Paris and Normandy, but their position gradually weakened as French military organization improved under leaders such as Arthur de Richemont (Constable of France) and Jean Bureau.

In 1435, the trajectory of the war shifted dramatically. The death of Bedford, a figure respected by the French, was soon followed by Burgundy's withdrawal from the English alliance after failed peace negotiations in Arras. Burgundy's allegiance to the Treaty of Troyes had already weakened, and his departure left the English with a more extensive and vulnerable border to defend. By the end of that year, aided by a local peasant uprising, French forces managed to seize eastern Normandy. Over the following year, Paris fell to the French, and Calais came under siege. There was a brief period of anxiety in Rouen, although the French campaign lacked coordination. The peasant revolt was violently suppressed, and the arrival of significant reinforcements from England helped stabilize the situation.

Between 1436 and 1442, the English managed to reclaim much of eastern Normandy through a series of minor sieges, which were influenced by their worsening financial situation. However, Dieppe remained out of English hands, and the loss of Louviers in 1440 placed French troops dangerously close to Rouen. Both English raids and French marauding bands, often a mix of soldiers and outlaws, along with outbreaks of plague and famine, caused widespread destruction in the countryside. Despite these setbacks, the English still had some local victories. For example, in December 1439, John Talbot led a bold assault that defeated the French besieging Avranches. In a brief campaign in 1441, Talbot and the Duke of York lifted the siege of Pontoise and nearly captured Charles VII, although exhaustion forced them to retreat. Charles continued his approach of avoiding direct confrontation, and soon after, the French stormed Pontoise and seized Évreux, closing in on Rouen.

By 1442, English military weakness was becoming obvious. French ships based in Dieppe made Channel crossings hazardous without a strong English navy, and Charles VII's campaign in Gascony further strained English resources. The shift to a defensive war, with little hope for spoils, became financially burdensome and forced the government to rely on loans from Cardinal Beaufort, giving him significant influence over military strategy. In 1438, an expedition was mounted to secure Maine for Beaufort's nephew, Dorset. The following year, the Duke of Somerset, another of Beaufort's nephews, led the last major English campaign of the war, bringing 4,500 troops, artillery, and bridging equipment to cross the Loire and pressure Charles VII into negotiations. Somerset's campaign mostly served his own interests and alienated Brittany, while Charles VII avoided battle and instead opened talks for peace. Although Charles VII paused his Gascon campaign, the English position was weak, resulting only in a temporary two-year truce.

== Final campaigns and the end of the war (1444–1453) ==
The final phase of the Hundred Years’ War was shaped by crucial diplomatic developments and renewed French military vigor under Charles VII. The turning point came with the Treaty of Arras in 1435, which reconciled Charles VII and Philip the Good, Duke of Burgundy. By ending the long-standing Anglo-Burgundian alliance, the treaty left England diplomatically isolated and allowed Charles to focus on reclaiming northern France. This diplomatic victory was followed by steady French military advances, the recapture of Paris in 1436, and the gradual erosion of English-held territories. In 1444, the Treaty of Tours established a temporary truce between England and France, sealed by the marriage of Henry VI of England to Margaret of Anjou. As part of the treaty, England agreed—albeit reluctantly and after secret negotiations—to surrender the county of Maine to France. The truce, while offering a brief respite from conflict, was deeply unpopular among the English nobility and failed to resolve the underlying territorial disputes.

When the truce expired in 1449, Charles VII's reformed and increasingly professional army launched a major offensive to recover Normandy. This campaign culminated in the Battle of Formigny in April 1450, where French forces, utilizing superior artillery, routed the English and precipitated the rapid collapse of English rule in Normandy. The war's final theater shifted to Gascony, with Bordeaux briefly returning to English hands before the French besieged Castillon in 1453. The decisive Battle of Castillon saw the death of the English commander John Talbot and the effective destruction of the last significant English field army in France. Bordeaux capitulated in October 1453, marking the practical end of the Hundred Years’ War. By the war's end, England retained only Calais on the continent, while France emerged unified and strengthened under Charles VII, its monarchy and territory restored largely through a combination of diplomatic strategy and military reform.

== See also ==
- Siege of Rouen

== Bibliography ==
- Allmand, Christopher (1988). The Hundred Years War: England and France at War, c.1300-c.1450. Cambridge: Cambridge University Press. ISBN 978-0-521-31923-2.
- Barker, Juliet R. V. (2010). Conquest: the English kingdom of France in the Hundred Years War (Reprinted ed.). London: Abacus. ISBN 978-0-349-12202-1.
- Bennett, Metthew (1994). Agincourt 1415: Triumph against the odds. London: Osprey. ISBN 1-85532-132-7.
- Burne, Alfred Higgins (1999). The Agincourt War : A Military History of the Latter Part of the Hundred Years War from 1369 to 1453. Ware, Hertfordshire: Wordsworth. ISBN 1840222115.
- Calmette, Joseph (1963). The Golden Age of Burgundy : the Magnificent Dukes and their Courts. New York: Norton. OCLC 1149189887.
- Curry, Anne (2006). Agincourt : A new History. Stroud: Tempus. ISBN 978-0-752-43813-9.
- Dockray, Keith (2004). Henry V. Stroud: Tempus. ISBN 978-0-752-43046-1.
- Griffiths, Ralph A. (28 May 2015). "Henry VI (1421–1471)". Oxford Dictionary of National Biography (online ed.). Oxford University Press. doi:10.1093/ref:odnb/12953. (Subscription, Wikipedia Library access or UK public library membership required.)
- Hooper, Nicholas; Bennett, Matthew (1996). The Cambridge Illustrated Atlas of Warfare The Middle Ages, 768 - 1487. Cambridge: Cambridge University Press. ISBN 0-521-44049-1.
- Jones, Michael K. (2015). 24 hours at Agincourt : 25 October 1415. London: WH Allen. ISBN 978-0-753-55545-3.
- Keen, Marice Hugh (2003). England in the Later Middle Ages: A Political History. Abingdon, Oxford: Routledge. ISBN 978-0-415-27293-3.
- Neillands, Robin (1990). The Hundred Years War. Revised edition. London: Routledge. ISBN 978-0-415-26131-9.
- Perroy, Edouard (1951). The Hundred Years War. London: Eyre & Spottiswoode. OCLC 1149428397.
- Powell, Edward; et al. (The New Cambridge Medieval History) (2008). "Lancastrian England". c. 1415— c. 1500. Vol. VII. Cambridge: Cambridge University Press. ISBN 978-0-521-38296-0.
- Reid, Peter (2007). By fire and Sword : the Rise and Fall of English Supremacy at Arms: 1314-1485. London: Constable. ISBN 978-1-845-29526-4.
- Sumption, Jonathan (2015). Cursed Kings. The Hundred Years War. Vol. IV. Philadelphia: University of Pennsylvania press. ISBN 978-0-812-24799-2.
- Tuck, Anthony (1986). Crown and Nobility, 1272-1461 : political conflict in late medieval England. Totowa: Barnes & Noble. ISBN 978-0-389-20612-5.
- Turvey, Roger (2015). Lancastrians, Yorkists and the Wars of the Roses 1399-1509. London: Hodder Education. ISBN 978-1-471-83811-8.
- Villalon, L.J.; Kagay, D.J, eds. (2005). The Hundred Years War: A Wider Focus. Boston: Brill. ISBN 978-90-04-13969-5.
- Vale, Malcolm Graham Allan (1974). Charles VII. Berkeley: University of California Press. OCLC 1288402090.
