= Battle of Jargeau =

1429 battle of the Hundred Years' War

Coordinates: 47.8667°N 2.1222°E

- Part of the Hundred Years' War
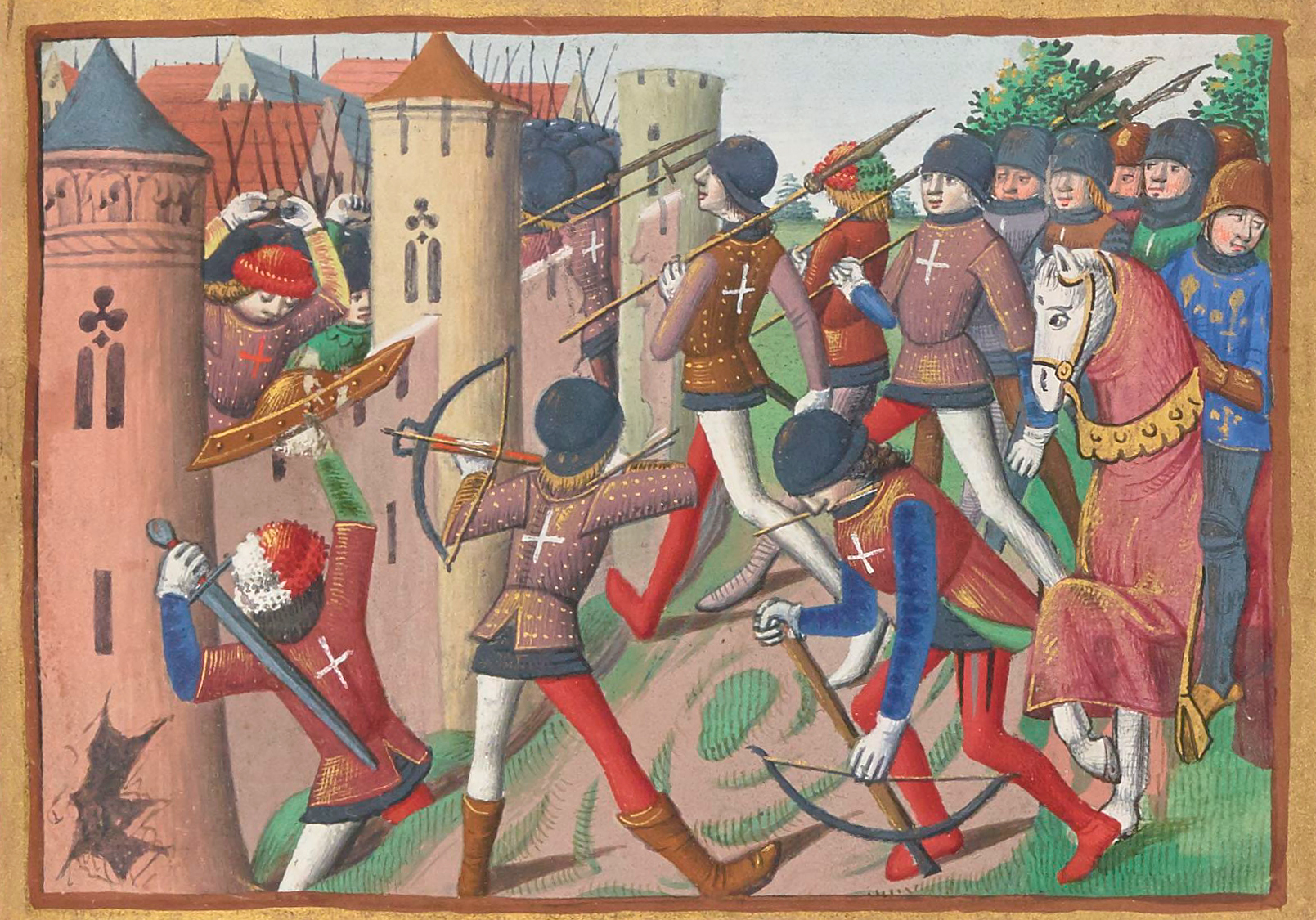
- Battle of Jargeau, miniature from Vigiles du roi Charles VII
Date	11–12 June 1429
Location	Jargeau, France
Result	French victory

Belligerents
Kingdom of France	Kingdom of England

Commanders and leaders
Joan of Arc; John II of Alençon	William de la Pole

Strength
3,000	5,000

Casualties and losses
Light	Heavy

The Battle of Jargeau took place on 11–12 June 1429. It was part of the Loire Campaign during the Hundred Years' War, where the forces of Charles VII of France successfully recaptured much of the region, following their victory at the Siege of Orléans. The battle ended in victory for Charles VII and is notable as Joan of Arc's first offensive battle.

== Background ==
By the end of 1428, during the later years of the Hundred Years' War, the English and their allies from the Burgundian faction had occupied almost all of France North of the Loire River. Many strategic points along the Loire had also been seized, and Orléans, the last major city on the river, had been under siege since October of that year (1428). If the English had been able to secure complete control of the Loire valley, the southern part of France, the last remaining position of the Dauphin would be open to invasion.

In early March 1429, Joan of Arc arrived at Chinon to meet with Charles VII and, after being examined by church officials in Poitiers, joined a large force which set out to relieve the siege at Orléans. This operation proved successful as the siege was lifted by 9 May.

Following the lifting of the siege of Orléans, Charles VII's forces spent the next month or so recruiting and growing in strength for the next phase of military operations. In early June, at a meeting of French military leaders in the presence of Charles VII, it was decided to pursue a strategy of clearing the Loire River valley of English troops. The Bridge at Orleans had been destroyed by the English at the end of the siege. The other bridges on the Loire (including Jargeau) were in English hands. The army was assembled at Orléans where Joan rejoined them on 9 June. That same day, they departed for Jargeau.

Meanwhile, on 8 June, Sir John Fastolf finally left Paris with a reinforcing army of several thousand, headed for the Loire River valley.

== Setting ==
Jargeau was a small town on the southern bank of the Loire river in central France, about ten miles east of Orléans. Conquered by the English a few years earlier as a staging point for a planned invasion of southern France, the city was defended by a wall with several towers and fortified gates. A ditch just on the outside of the walls further enhanced the defenses. Outside the walls, suburbs had grown. There was a single fortified bridge, of strategic significance during the latter part of the war, crossing the Loire River to the north bank. The city was defended by approximately 700 troops armed with gunpowder weaponry.

== Battle ==
Charles' VII's army included commanders such as Jean d'Orléans, Gilles de Rais, Jean Poton de Xaintrailles, and La Hire. The Duke of Suffolk William de la Pole led the English defense of the town.

The battle began with a French assault on the suburbs. English defenders left the city walls and the French fell back. Joan of Arc used her standard to begin a French rally. The English retreated to the city walls and the French lodged in the suburbs for the night.

The following morning Joan of Arc called upon the defenders to surrender. They refused. The French followed with a heavy artillery bombardment using primitive cannons and siege engines. One of the town's towers fell. Suffolk entered surrender negotiations with a minor French captain at the time, La Hire. This breach of protocol antagonized the French command.

Joan of Arc initiated an assault on the town walls, surviving a stone projectile that shattered against her helmet, knocking her to the ground. The English suffered heavy losses, and the garrison was executed by the French. William de la Pole attempted to escape across the bridge to the north bank of the Loire but was captured.

== See also ==
- Jargeau
- Medieval warfare
- French military history

== Bibliography ==
- DeVries, Kelly. Joan of Arc: A Military Leader (Glaucestershire: Sutton Publishing, 1999). ISBN 0-7509-1805-5
- Richey, Stephen W. Joan of Arc: The Warrior Saint. (Westport, CT: Praeger, 2003). ISBN 0-275-98103-7
- Allmand, C. The Hundred Years' War: England and France at War c. 1300–1450. (Cambridge: Cambridge University Press, 1988). ISBN 0-521-31923-4
