= Jean Poton de Xaintrailles =

15th-century French noble

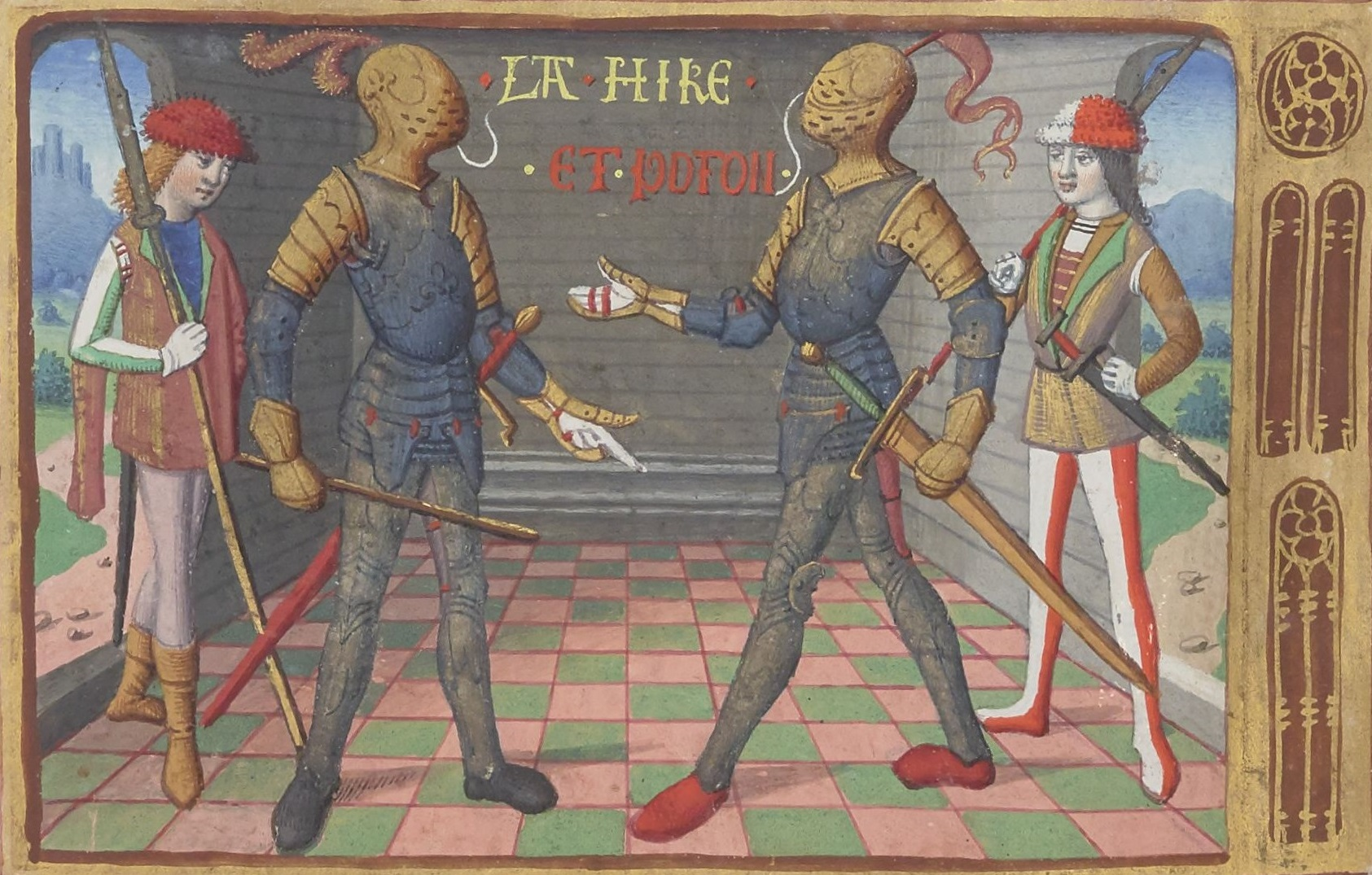
Xaintrailles and La Hire depicted in a 15th-century illuminated book.

Jean Poton de Xaintrailles (French: [ʒɑ̃ pɔtɔ̃ də sɛ̃tʁaj]; c. 1390 – 7 October 1461), a minor noble of Gascon origin, was one of the chief lieutenants of Joan of Arc.

He served as master of the royal stables, as royal bailiff in Berry and as seneschal of Limousin. In 1454 he was appointed a Marshal of France. Jean Poton was a leading figure on the French side in the Hundred Years War.

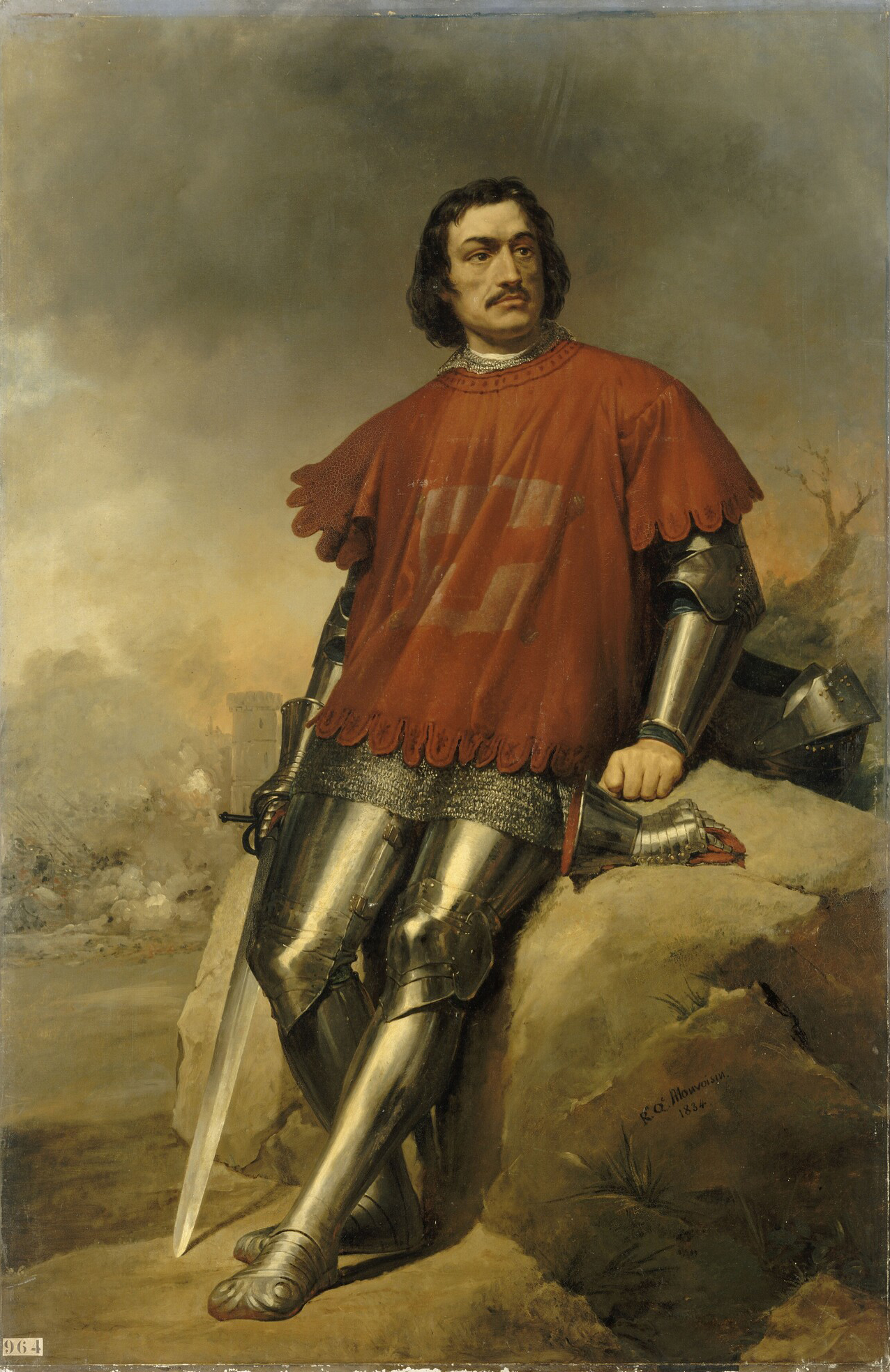
Jean Poton de Xaintrailles

He fought at the battle of Verneuil in 1424. His participation, along with Joan of Arc, in the battle at Orléans in 1429 led to the end of the Siege of Orléans. He was badly wounded during this battle. He was captured by the Earl of Warwick in a skirmish at Savignies near Beauvais in 1431. In 1433 he was exchanged for John Talbot. Jean Poton fought numerous battles alongside Joan of Arc during the Loire Campaign and retained a lifelong support for her. With La Hire, he even tried, albeit in vain, to rescue Joan after she was captured. Believing Joan was being held captive in Compiègne, Jean Poton captured it, only to learn that the prisoner had already been moved to Rouen.

He served with Joan of Arc at the Siege of Orléans, and the battles of Jargeau, Meung-sur-Loire, Beaugency and Patay. He raised the siege of Compiègne.

In the latter phase of the Hundred Years War he was active in the reconquest of Normandy and the conquest of Guyenne, often with Étienne de Vignolles, better known as La Hire, including the action at Gerbevoy. When the standing army was created in 1445, Xaintrailles was appointed to command one of the twelve companies of the new army.

He died in Bordeaux without heirs and left his estate to the church.

Coat of arms of Jean Poton de Xaintrailles

== Popular culture ==
Xaintrailles is a minor figure in the "Catherine" novels of Juliette Benzoni.

== See also ==
- Military history of France
