= Timeline of the Hundred Years' War =

This is a timeline of the Hundred Years' War between England and France from 1337 to 1453 as well as some of the events leading up to the war. (The Hundred Years' War actually spanned for 116 years.)

== Timeline ==
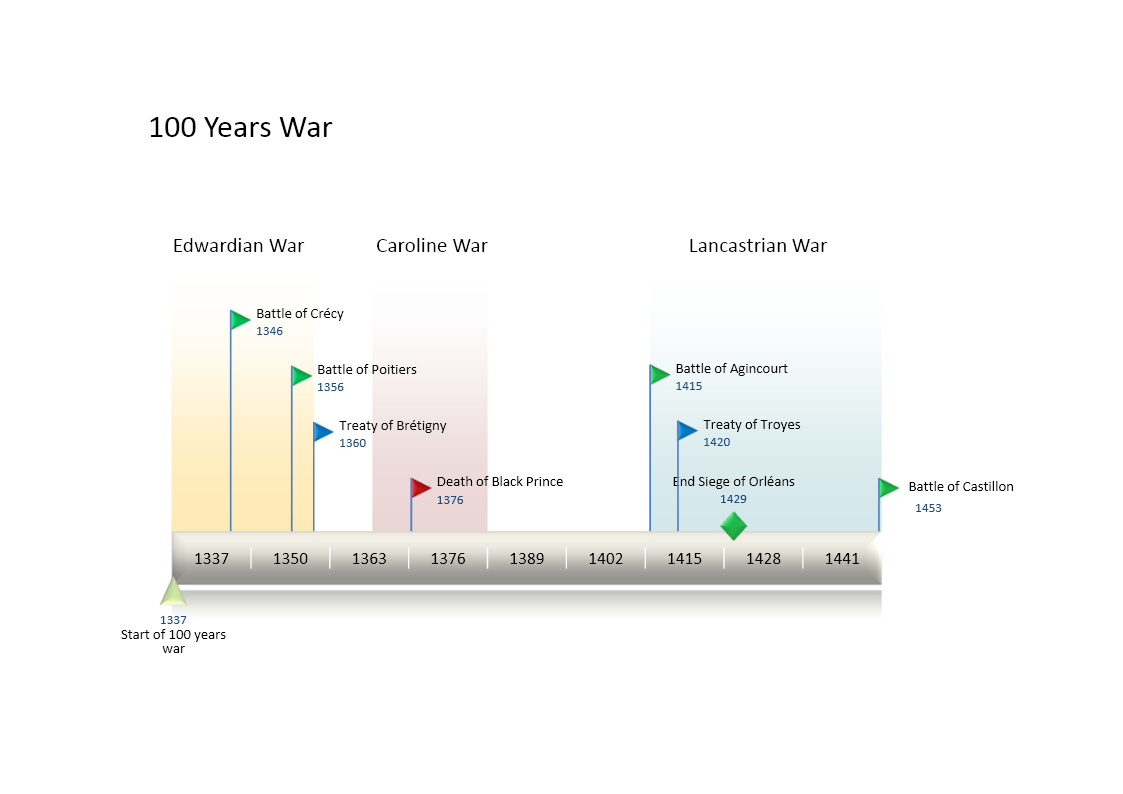
Timeline of 100 Years War

== Background ==
- 1259: The Treaty of Paris between Henry III of England and Louis IX of France acknowledges the loss of most of the Angevin Empire. Henry III keeps the remains of the Duchy of Aquitaine, mainly Gascony as a vassal of Louis IX.
- 1314: Philip IV of France dies leaving three sons, Louis X, Philip V and Charles IV.
- 1316: Louis X dies. His daughter Joan II of Navarre is bypassed in favour of his brother Philip V.
- 1322: Philip V dies. His daughters are also put aside, the third brother, Charles IV becomes King of France.
- 1324: The War of Saint-Sardos between Charles IV and Edward II of England. The war is a complete failure for England and ends with the French capture of La Réole.
- 1328: Charles IV of France dies leaving only daughters. His sister Isabella of France, now the effective ruler of England, claims the French throne for her son Edward III of England as Charles' closest living male relative. However the French nobility favour Philip VI, the closest in unbroken male line.
- 1330: Edward III seizes power in England. He has Isabella imprisoned and her lover Roger Mortimer, 1st Earl of March executed.
- 1331: Edward III renounces his claim to France and accept Philip VI as his liege in Aquitaine.
- 1332: Birth of Charles II of Navarre, son of Joan II of Navarre and grandson of Louis X of France.
- 1332: War breaks out between Edward III and David II of Scotland, beginning the Second War of Scottish Independence. Scotland was a French ally under the Auld Alliance.
- 1335: Philip VI makes plans for sending an expedition force to Scotland.
- 1336:
  - 26 January: Draft peace treaty agreed to between England and Scotland pending approval of David II.
  - March: Secret meeting between Philip VI and Pope Benedict XII at Avignon. The pope tells the French king he intends to cancel the planned crusade.
  - 11 March: Parliament assembles at Westminster. No Scottish ambassador appears.
  - Easter: Philip VI meets representatives of the Scots at Lyons. Preparations for a French expedition to Scotland resumes.
  - 7 April: Edward announces that he will invade Scotland in great numbers once the truce expires.
  - May: Henry of Lancaster departs for the north to take command of the English campaign in Scotland. Edward III appoints admirals to requisition ships for coastal defence.
  - Early June: Henry of Lancaster reaches Perth. Edward III receives detailed information on Philip VI's plans in Scotland. A small force under Sir Thomas Rosslyn is sent to fortify the ruined castle of Dunnottar
  - 11 June: Edward III departs for Scotland via Newcastle with a force of 400 men.
  - 25 June: The Great Council of England assembles at Northampton. They eventually decide to send a new embassy to France.
  - 7 July: The bishops of Durham and Winchester and two others are appointed English ambassadors to France.
  - 11 July: In case brought before the Parlement of Paris by Garcie Arnaud, lord of Navailles Edward III is found to be in default and ordered to deliver the bastide of Puymirol. The English government refuses. The French begin preparations for the seizure of the Duchy of Aquitaine.
  - 12 July: Edward III moves north from Perth with an additional 400 men from Henry of Lancaster's troops.
  - 17 July: Edward III reaches Moray Firth.
  - 22 July: Edward arrives at Aberdeen from the north and burns the town to the ground.
  - 24 July: The English embassy to France embarks at Dover.
  - Late July: John of Eltham, Earl of Cornwall enters Scotland with several thousand men to ravage Carrick and the Clyde valley. With the arrival of the Mediterranean fleet French naval strength in the Channel ports numbers 26 galleys.
  - The Battle of Sluys
  - August: The bishops of Durham and Winchester have a series of fruitless meetings with Philip VI and his Council in Paris. Edward III forbids all exports of wool and leather.
  - 20 August: Philip VI gives the English ambassadors his final answer. He intends to invade England and Scotland immediately with the fleet and army he has gathered. The ambassadors send a clerk, William Tickhill, to warn the Council of England.
  - 22 August: Four French privateers attack the English town of Orford.
  - 24 August: Tickhill arrives at Northampton. The chancellor, John de Stratford, issues writs to convene another Great Council at Nottingham and sends Tichkhill to report to Edward III in Scotland.
  - French privateers capture several royal ships and load merchantmen anchored at the Isle of Wight.
  - 6 September: The combined fleets of the two English Admiralties are ordered to attack the retreating French galleys, but by now they have returned to their bases.
  - 25 September: The Great Council opens at Nottingham, Edward III having arrived the day before. With Southern England gripped by invasion fever they grant a tax of one tenth and fifteenth and prepares to levy more than 80 000 men in coastal defence.
  - September: English agent John Thrandeston is sent on a diplomatic mission to the counts of Hainault, Juliers and Guelders. In France English merchants and travellers are arrested and their goods seized. The English retaliate in kind.
  - October: Edward III seizes the treasure gathered at St Mary's Abbey at York for the crusade. Sir Andrew Murray captures and destroys Dunnottar, Kynnef and Lauriston, and lay waste to Gowrie, Angus and Mearns to deny their use to the English. John Thrandeston visits the court of William I, Count of Hainaut at Valenciennes.
  - 18 October: Edward III marches to Bothwell.
  - 22 October: The English government disbands the fleet of the western Admiralty.
  - 26 October: The English government disbands the fleet of the northern Admiralty.
  - 8 November: The mass recruitment of coastal militias ordered by the Council of Nottingham is cancelled.
  - December: Edward III leaves Scotland to pass Christmas at Hatfield.
  - 26 December: Philip VI formally demands from the English Seneschal in Gascony the extradition of the exile Robert III of Artois from England.
- 1337:
  - 5 January: Representatives of the ports of the western and northern Admiralties assembles in London to hear the services in the coming year: three months of service without compensation.
  - 10 January: Edward II obtains the consent of a Council of magnates to issue writs requiring free service from the ports with the seamen's consent or not. All ships are to assemble at Portsmouth on 15 March.
  - January: Robert Ufford and William Montagu are appointed admirals.
  - February: Philip purchases Cambrai and four other castles in the Cambrésis for his son John of Normandy. Etienne le Galois de la Baume, the French Master of Crossbowmen arrives in the south-west where he makes a failed attempt to capture the town of Saint-Macaire. In England the day of assembly for the northern Admiralty is moved forward one month with orders to proceed at once to Orwell. 20 ships of the western Admiralty at Southampton are ordered to leave immediately for Bordeaux. In Scotland Andrew Murray takes Kinclaven Castle before invading Fife with William Douglas, Lord of Liddesdale. Falkland tower and Leuchars fall to the Scots.
  - 28 February: St Andrews Castle surrenders to the Scots after a three weeks siege.
  - March: Murray captures Bothwell Castle.
  - 3 March: Parliament of England meet at Westminster.
  - 16 March: Parliament closes. The Lords have endorsed Edward III's plans to dispatch an army to Aquitaine and send an ultimatum to the King of France. Six earldoms have been created and Edward III's six years old heir Edward of Woodstock has become the Duke of Cornwall, the first use of the ducal title in England.
  - William I of Hainaut announces that he intends convene a great diplomatic conference at Valenciennes on 4 May.
  - 15 April: The English delegation to the peace conference at Valenciennes is announced: Henry Burghersh, Bishop of Lincoln, William Montagu, 1st Earl of Salisbury and William de Clinton, 1st Earl of Huntingdon.
  - Late April: Philip VI refuses to receive ambassadors bearing the final proposals of the King of England.
  - 30 April: The arrière-ban is proclaimed throughout the Kingdom of France.
  - May: Philip VI comes to Paris to preside over a meeting of his Great Council. It is decided that the duchy of Aquitaine will be declared forfeit on the grounds that Edward III is sheltering the King's enemy, Robert of Artois.
  - 4 May: The peace conference at Valenciennes opens with, as expected, only those well disposed to Edward III represented.
  - 20 May: Gaston II of Foix-Béarn, the French commander in the south, receives his orders.
  - 23 May: The Constable of France, Raoul I of Brienne, Count of Eu, receives his orders.
  - 24 May: The bailli of Amiens is instructed to take possession of the English enclave of Ponthieu.
  - May: Jeanne de Valois, Countess of Hainaut, Philip VI's sister, comes to Paris from Valenciennes with the conference's peace proposal. The proposals are dismissed.
  - 7 June: Death of William I of Hainaut. He is succeeded by his son William II, Count of Hainaut
  - June: The English ambassadors departs Valenciennes to visit John III, Duke of Brabant at Brussels and then the excommunicated Emperor, Louis of Bavaria, at Frankfurt. In return for a fee the Emperor promises to support an English invasion. The princes of the Low Countries sign similar agreements.
  - 28 June: Edward III starts issuing orders for an expeditionary army to sail from London 28 July.

== 1337–1360 ==
- 1340: The Battle of Sluys
- 1340: 26 January: Edward III declares himself 'King of France' in the marketplace of Ghent.
- 1341: The Breton War of Succession breaks out. Edward supports John of Montfort while Philip backs Charles of Blois.
- 1346: Edward III inflicts a crushing defeat on Philip VI at the Battle of Crécy. The Scots invade England but, are defeated at the Battle of Neville's Cross.
- 1347: Calais falls to Edward III. David II is captured.
- 1348: The Black Death reaches Europe.
- 1350: Philip VI dies and is succeeded by his son John II.
- 1351: The Battle of the Thirty.
- 1356: Edward, the Black Prince, son of Edward III, defeats John II at the Battle of Poitiers. John II is among the captured.
- 1358: Peasant revolt in France called the Jacquerie.
- 1359: John II signs the Second Treaty of London accepting huge territorial losses and an enormous ransom. However Charles, John's son and heir, refuse to accept.
- 1360: The Treaty of Brétigny. Edward III renounces his claim to the French throne in return for the restoration and suzerainty of Aquitaine. Edward makes his son, the Black Prince, Duke of Aquitaine.

== 1360–1400 ==
- 1360: Black Monday – a freak hail storm struck and killed an estimated 1,000 English soldiers, causing mass casualty.
- 1364: The defeat and death of Charles of Blois at the Battle of Auray marks the end of the Breton War of Succession.
- 1366: The Black Prince intervenes in the civil war in Castile between Pedro the Cruel and Henry of Trastamara.
- 1369: Charles V declares war after the Black Prince rejects a summons demanding the latter's presence in Paris, ending the 1360 truce.
- 1370: John Chandos, the English Seneschal of Poitou is defeated and slain at Chateau Lussac.
- 1372: French commander Bertrand du Guesclin captures Poitiers.
- 1376: Edward the Black Prince dies.
- 1377: Du Guesclin takes Bergerac.
- 1377: Edward III dies. His grandson Richard II becomes King of England.
- 1380: Earl of Buckingham commanded an expedition to France to aid England's ally the Duke of Brittany. The French refused battle so Buckingham forces continued a chevauchée and laid siege to Nantes.
- 1380: Charles V dies and is succeeded by his son, the 10-year-old Charles VI.
- 1381: The Duke of Brittany reconciles to the regime of Charles VI and pays 50,000 franc to Buckingham to abandon the siege and the campaign.
- 1389: The Truce of Leulinghem is signed by Richard II and Charles VI. England evacuates all of its holdings in northern France except Calais.
- 1399: Richard II is deposed by his cousin, Henry Bolingbroke, who becomes Henry IV of England.

== 1400–1422 ==
- 1413: Henry IV dies and is succeeded by his son, Henry V of England.
- 1415: Henry V lands at Harfleur in Normandy and takes the city. He wins a near-total victory over the French at the Battle of Agincourt.
- 1417: Henry V takes Caen.
- 1419: Rouen falls to Henry V on 19 January, placing Normandy under English control. Burgundy allies with England.
- 1420: Henry V and Charles VI of France sign the Treaty of Troyes. Henry marries Catherine of Valois, daughter of Charles VI, and their heir would inherit both kingdoms. The Dauphin, Charles VII is declared illegitimate.
- 1422: Henry V dies on 31 August, aged 34 years and 349 days, and Charles VI on 21 October, at 53 years and 322 days of age. Henry's young son, Henry VI of England, who is 268 days old at the time, is crowned king of both England and France. However, in central France, the Dauphin continues the war.

== 1422–1453 ==
- 1424: One of Henry VI's regents, Humphrey, Duke of Gloucester, marries Jacqueline, Countess of Hainaut, and invades Holland to regain her former dominions, bringing him into direct conflict with Philip III, Duke of Burgundy.
- 1428: The English lay siege to Orléans.
- 1429: Joan of Arc breaks the siege of Orléans. The Dauphin is crowned King of France at Reims.
- 1430: Joan is captured by the Burgundians and later sold to the English.
- 1431: Joan of Arc tried and executed.
- 1435: The Duchy of Burgundy reconciles with France under the Treaty of Arras, ending its alliance with England.
- 1449: The French recapture Rouen.
- 1450: An English attempt to relieve Caen is defeated at the Battle of Formigny. The French take Cherbourg.
- 1451: Bordeaux and Bayonne fall to French forces.
- 1453: John Talbot, 1st Earl of Shrewsbury attempts to retake Gascony, but is defeated by Jean Bureau at the Battle of Castillon.

The Battle of Castillon is generally considered the end of the Hundred Years' War as Henry VI's insanity and the Wars of the Roses left England in no position to wage war in France. However Calais remained an English possession until 1558 and the title of King of France was not omitted from the English royal style until 1 January 1801 (347 years and 168 days after the Battle of Castillon).
