= Hundred Years' War =

Medieval Anglo-French conflicts, 1337–1453

- Part of the crisis of the late Middle Ages and the Anglo-French Wars
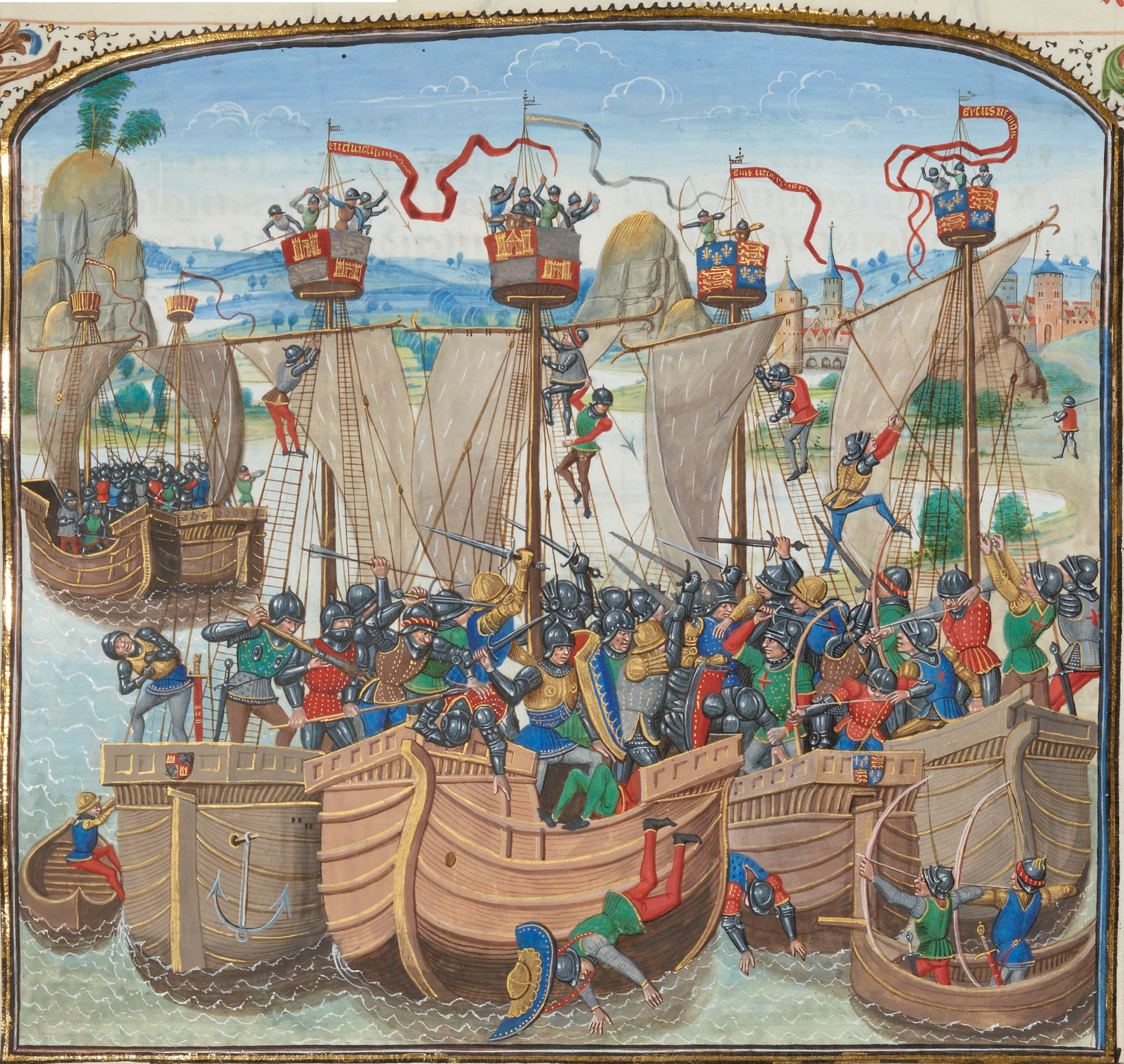
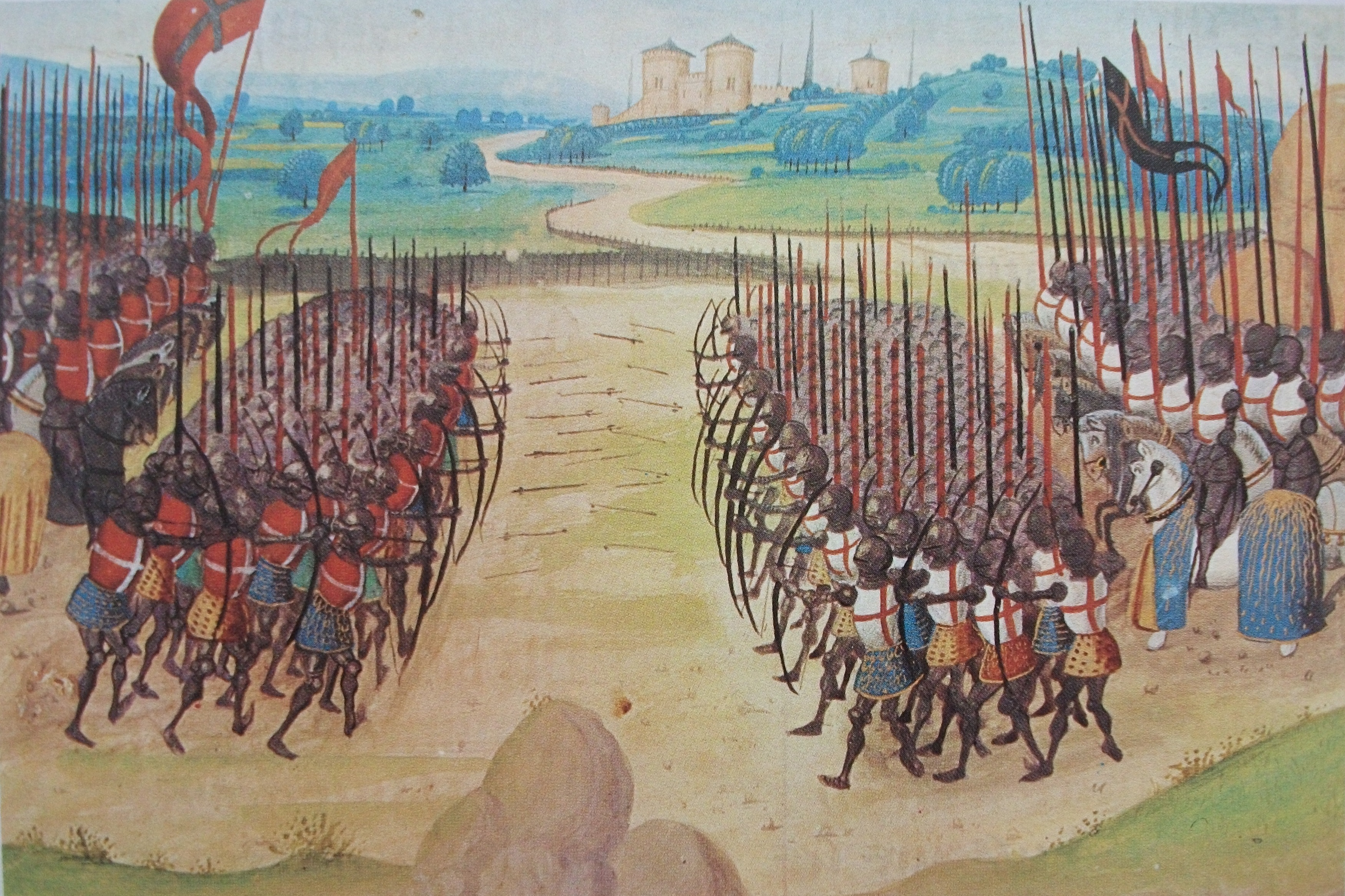
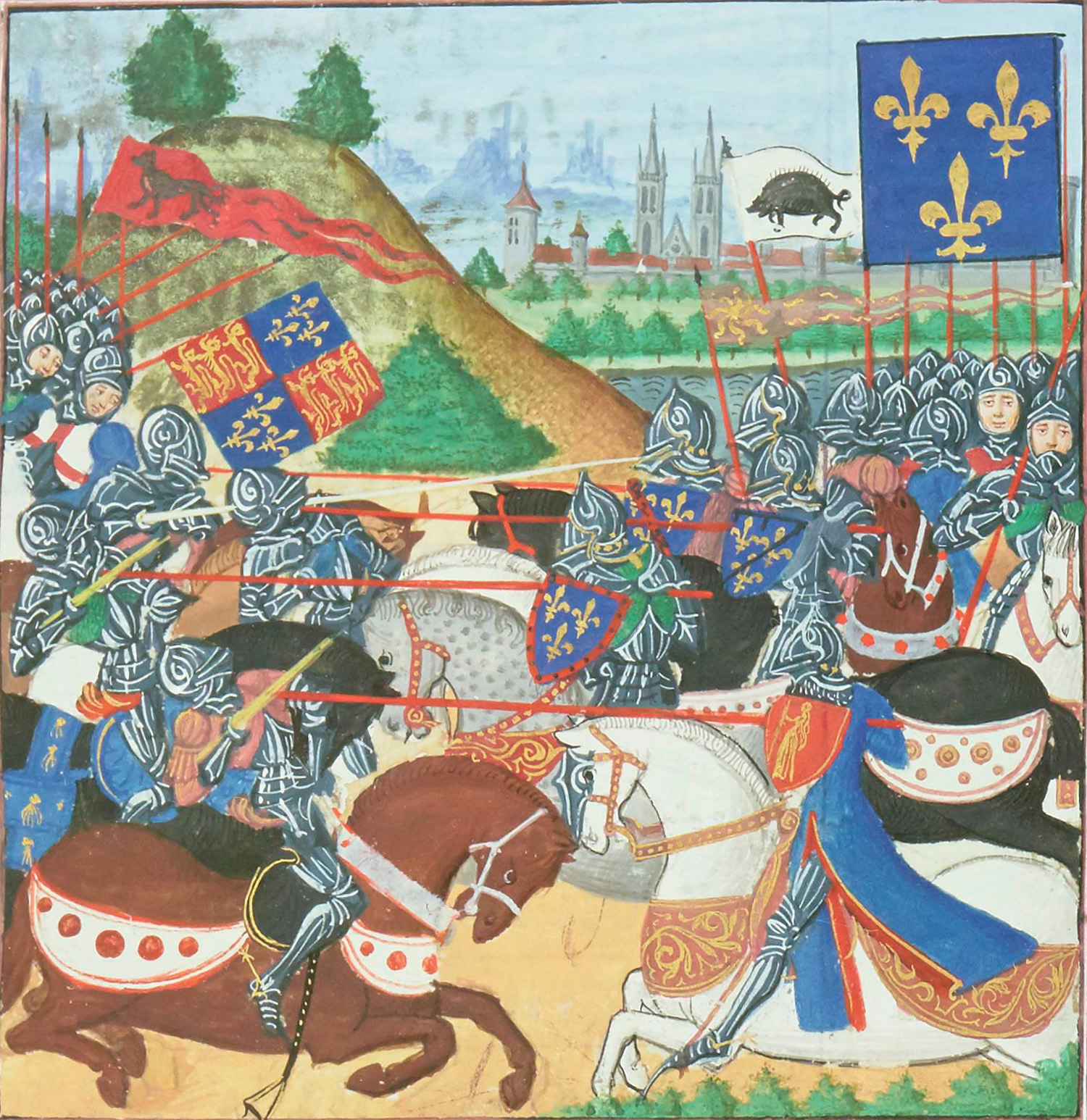
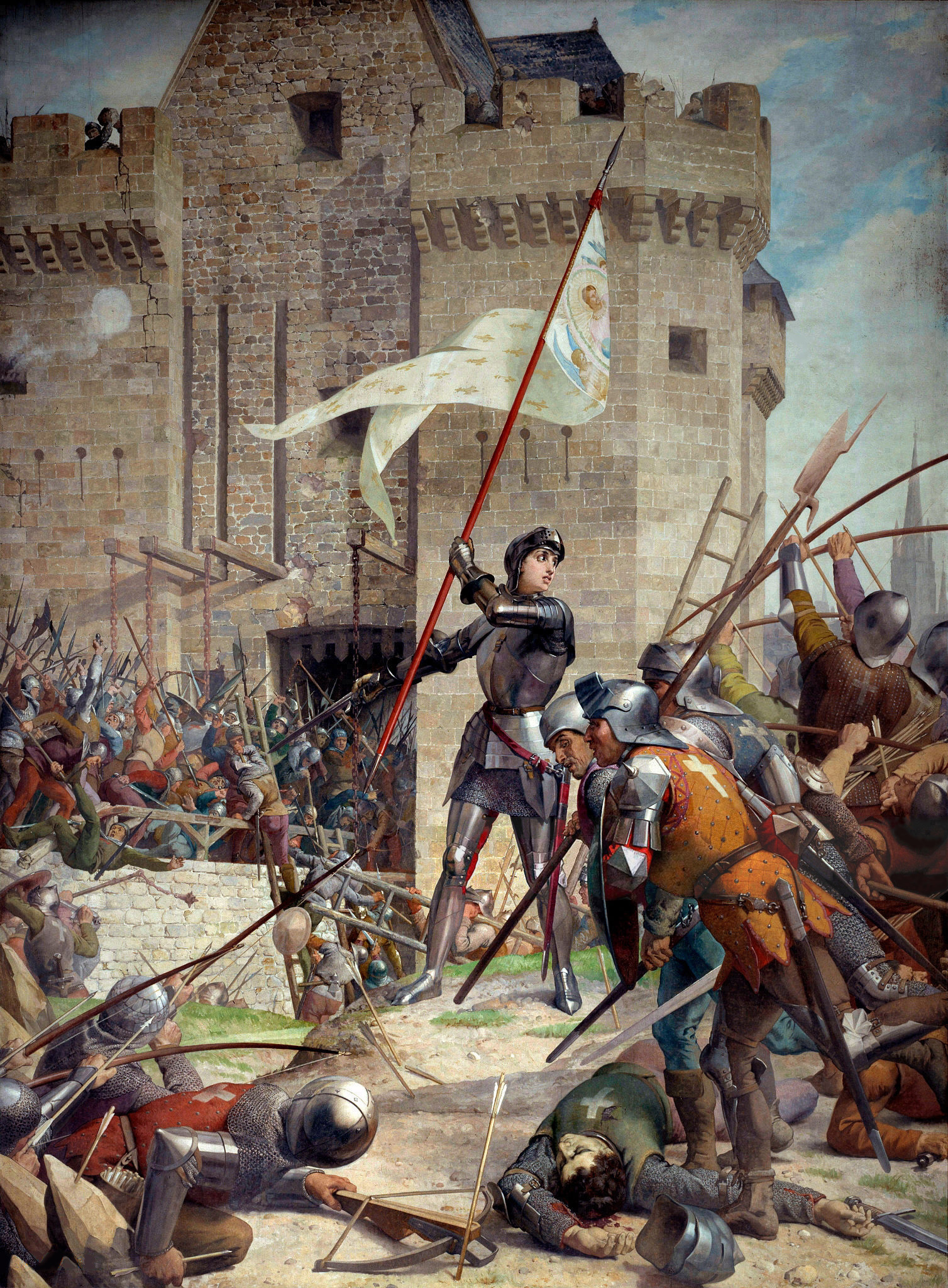
- Clockwise, from top left: The Battle of La Rochelle; The Battle of Agincourt; Joan of Arc at the Siege of Orléans; The Battle of Patay
Date	24 May 1337 – 19 October 1453 (intermittent) (Note: 24 May 1337 is the day when Philip VI of France confiscated Aquitaine from Edward III of England, who responded by claiming the French throne. Bordeaux fell to the French on 19 October 1453; there were no more hostilities afterwards.) (116 years, 4 months, 3 weeks and 4 days)
Location	France, the Low Countries, Great Britain, the Iberian Peninsula
Result	French and allied victory
Territorial changes	England loses all continental possessions except for the Pale of Calais.

Belligerents
Kingdom of France loyal to the House of Valois	Kingdom of England: Kingdom of France loyal to the House of Plantagenet
Burgundian State (1337–1419; 1435–1453); Duchy of Brittany; Crown of Castile; Kingdom of Bohemia; Kingdom of Scotland; Welsh rebels; Crown of Aragon	Burgundian State (1419–1435); Duchy of Brittany; Kingdom of Portugal; Kingdom of Navarre; Duchy of Gascony

Commanders and leaders
Philip VI #; John II (surrendered); Charles V #; Charles VI #; Charles VII; Louis, Dauphin; Joan of Arc (executed); Gilles de Rais; Jean de Dunois; Bertrand du Guesclin; Philip the Bold; John the Fearless; Owain Glyndŵr; Philip the Good; Charles of Blois †; David II (surrendered); John Stewart †; Henry of Trastámara; John I	Edward III #; Richard II X; Henry IV #; Henry V #; Henry VI; Edward the Black Prince; John of Gaunt; Richard of York; John of Lancaster; Henry of Lancaster; Jean III de Grailly (surrendered); Thomas Montacute †; John Talbot †; John Fastolf; Robert d'Artois; Philip the Good; John of Montfort

Casualties and losses
- 185,250 (approx.) French and English soldiers killed in combat, ~556,000 total French and English military deaths

The Hundred Years' War (French: Guerre de Cent Ans; 1337–1453) was a series of conflicts between the kingdoms of England and France, and a civil war in France during the late Middle Ages. It emerged from feudal disputes over the Duchy of Aquitaine and was triggered by a claim to the French throne made by Edward III of England. The war grew into a broader military, economic, and political struggle involving various factions from across Western Europe, fueled by emerging nationalism on both sides. The periodization of the war typically charts it as taking place over 116 years. However, it was an intermittent conflict which was frequently interrupted by external factors, such as the Black Death, and several years of truces.

The Hundred Years' War was a significant conflict in the Middle Ages. During the war, five generations of kings from two rival dynasties fought for the throne of France, then the wealthiest and most populous kingdom in Western Europe. The war had a lasting effect on European history: both sides produced innovations in military technology and tactics, including professional standing armies and artillery, that permanently changed European warfare. Chivalry reached its height during the conflict and subsequently declined. Stronger national identities took root in both kingdoms, which became more centralized and gradually emerged as global powers.

The term "Hundred Years' War" was adopted by later historians and included dynastically related conflicts in Spain and Belgium, resulting in the longest military conflict in European history. The war is commonly divided into three phases, separated by truces: the Edwardian War (1337–1360), the Caroline War (1369–1389), and the Lancastrian War (1415–1453). Each side drew many allies into the conflict, with English forces initially prevailing; however, the French forces under the House of Valois ultimately retained control over the Kingdom of France. The French and English monarchies thereafter remained separate, despite the monarchs of England and Great Britain styling themselves as sovereigns of France until 1802.

== Overview ==
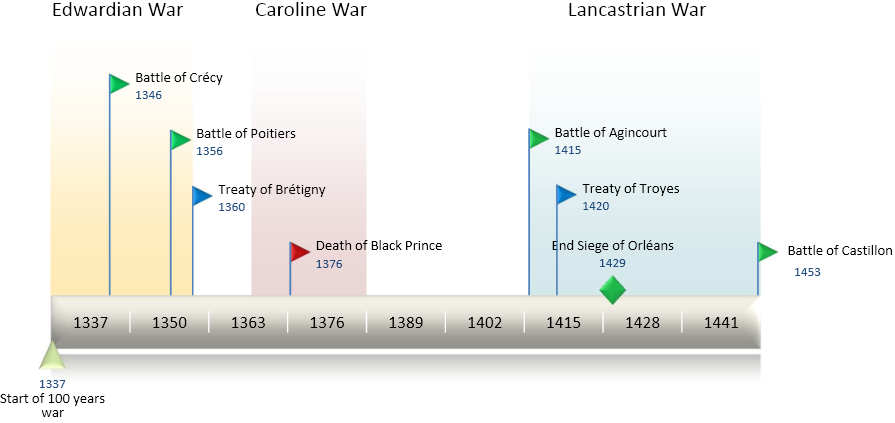
A timeline of the key events of the Hundred Years' War

=== Origins ===
The root causes of the conflict can be traced to the crisis of 14th-century Europe. The outbreak of war was motivated by a gradual rise in tension between the kings of France and England over territory; the official pretext was the interruption of the direct male line of the Capetian dynasty.

Tensions between the French and English crowns had gone back centuries, since the Norman Conquest of 1066 had put a king of (Norman) French origins, William II, Duke of Normandy, on the throne of England. Since that time, English monarchs had held titles and lands within France, which made them vassals to the kings of France. The status of the English king's French fiefs was a significant source of conflict between the two monarchies throughout the Middle Ages. According to military historian and author Michael Livingston, the conflict began in 1337, when Philippe VI of France claimed that France controlled English holdings in France.

In 1328, Charles IV of France died without any sons or brothers, initiating a succession crisis. A similar crisis in 1316 had resulted in the Estates-General in 1317 deciding that "Women do not succeed in the kingdom of France". Charles's closest male relative was his nephew Edward III of England, whose mother Isabella was Charles's sister. Isabella claimed the throne of France for her son by the rule of proximity of blood, but the French nobility rejected this on the basis of the 1317 decision, declaring that Isabella could not transmit a right she did not possess. An assembly of French barons decided that a native Frenchman should receive the crown rather than Edward.

The throne passed to Charles's patrilineal cousin instead, Philip, Count of Valois who had been made regent on the death of Charles IV. Edward protested but ultimately submitted and did homage for Gascony. Further French disagreements with Edward induced Philip during May 1337 to meet with his Great Council in Paris. It was agreed that Gascony should be taken back into Philip's hands, which prompted Edward to renew his claim for the French throne, this time by force of arms.

=== Edwardian phase ===
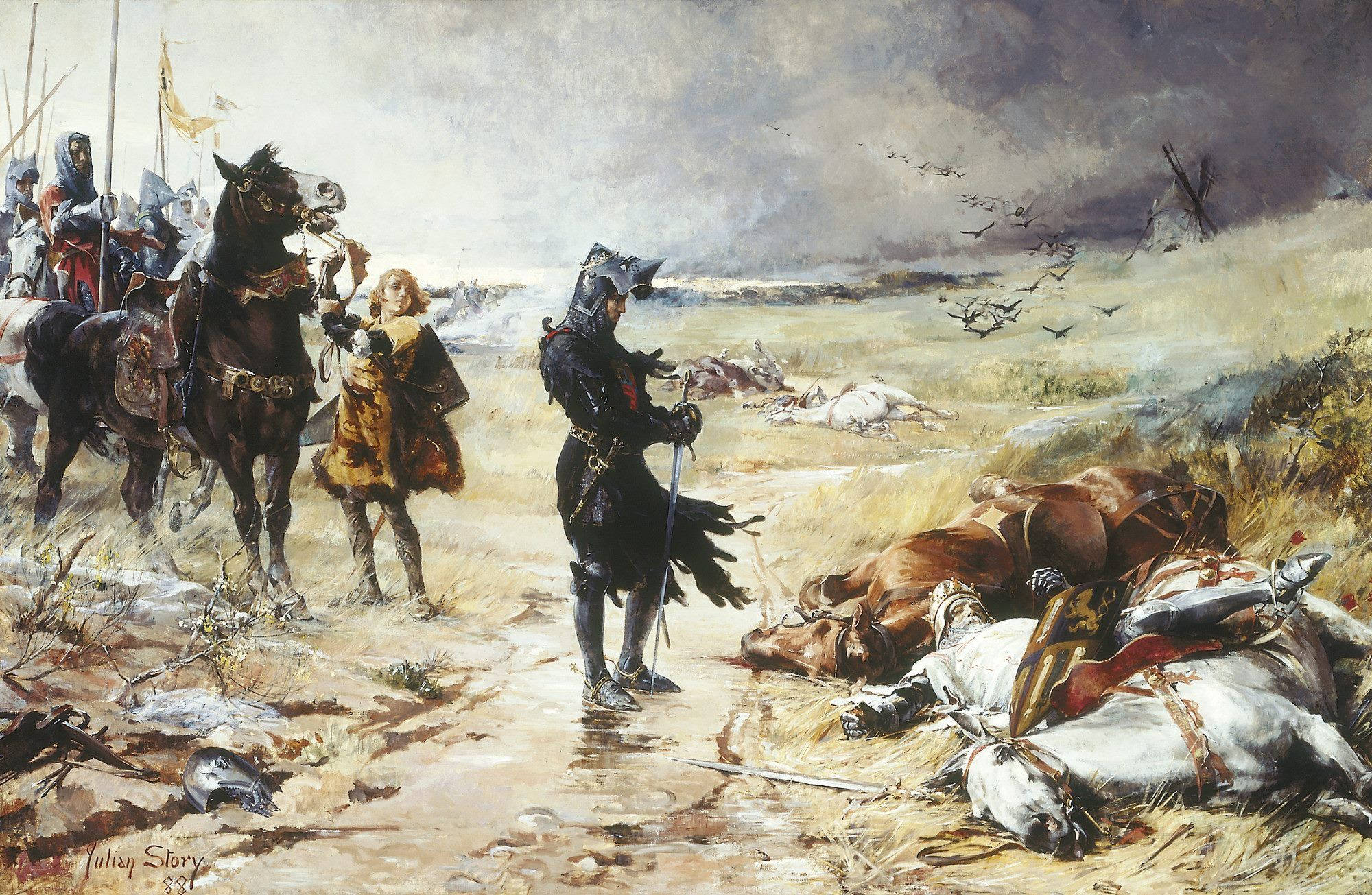
Painting by Julian Russel Story of the Black Prince at the battle of Crécy. At his feet lies the body of the dead King John of Bohemia.

In the early years of the war, the English, led by King Edward III and his son Edward the Black Prince, saw resounding successes, notably at the battles of Crécy (1346) and Poitiers (1356), where King John II of France, having succeeded his father Philip from 1350, was taken prisoner.

=== Caroline phase and Black Death ===
By 1378, under King Charles V the Wise and the leadership of Bertrand du Guesclin, the French had reconquered most of the lands ceded to King Edward in the Treaty of Brétigny (signed in 1360), notably reducing English control on the continent, leaving them with few cities.

However, both countries faced challenges and problems. The Black Death, a deadly plague that spread through Europe between 1347 and 1351, caused catastrophic widespread damage. In France, 6 to 12 million people died, representing over a third of the population, resulting in major labour shortages, economic collapse, and widespread social dislocation. England also suffered from the Black Death, but to a lesser extent, with roughly 2–3 million deaths. Economic consequences of the plague and the war led to major unrest in both kingdoms, widespread poverty, and a weakening of royal authority. These crises were resolved in England earlier than in France.

=== Lancastrian phase and after ===
King Henry V of England seized the opportunity presented by the mental illness of King Charles VI of France and the French civil war between Armagnacs and Burgundians to revive the conflict. Overwhelming victories at the battles of Agincourt (1415) and Verneuil (1424) – as well as an alliance with the Burgundians – raised the prospects of an ultimate English triumph and persuaded the English to continue the war over many decades. A variety of factors prevented this, however. Notable influences include the deaths of both Henry and Charles in 1422, the emergence of Joan of Arc (which boosted French morale), and the loss of Burgundy as an ally (concluding the French civil war).

The Siege of Orléans (1429) made English aspirations for conquest all but unreal. Despite Joan's capture by the Burgundians and her subsequent execution in 1431, a series of crushing French victories concluded the siege, favouring the Valois dynasty. Notably, the battles of Patay (1429), Formigny (1450), and Castillon (1453) proved decisive in ending the war. England permanently lost most of its continental possessions, with only the Pale of Calais remaining under its control on the continent until the Siege of Calais in 1558.

=== Related conflicts and after-effects ===
Local conflicts in neighboring areas, which were contemporarily related to the war, including the War of the Breton Succession (1341–1364), the Castilian Civil War (1366–1369), the War of the Two Peters (1356–1369) in Aragon, and the 1383–1385 crisis in Portugal, were used by the parties to advance their agendas.

By the war's end, feudal armies had mainly been replaced by professional troops, and aristocratic dominance had yielded to a democratization of the manpower and weapons of armies. Although primarily a dynastic conflict, the war inspired French and English nationalism. The broader introduction of weapons and tactics supplanted the feudal armies where heavy cavalry had dominated, and artillery became important. The war precipitated the creation of the first standing armies in Western Europe since the Western Roman Empire and helped change their role in warfare.

Civil wars, deadly epidemics, famines, and bandit free-companies of mercenaries reduced the population drastically in France. But at the end of the war, the French had the upper hand with their better weapon supply, such as small hand-held cannons. In England, political forces over time came to oppose the costly venture. After the war England was left insolvent, leaving the conquering French in complete control of all of France except Calais. The dissatisfaction of English nobles, resulting from the loss of their continental landholdings as well as the general shock at losing a war in which investment had been so significant, helped lead to the Wars of the Roses (1455–1487). The economic consequences of the Hundred Years' War produced a decline in trade and led to a high collection of taxes from both countries, which played a significant role in civil disorder.

== Causes and prelude ==
=== Dynastic turmoil in France: 1316–1328 ===
The question of female succession to the French throne was raised after the death of Louis X in 1316. Louis left behind a young daughter, Joan II of Navarre, and a son, John I of France, although he only lived for five days. However, Joan's paternity was in question, as her mother, Margaret of Burgundy, was accused of being an adulterer in the Tour de Nesle affair. Given the situation, Philip, Count of Poitiers and brother of Louis X, positioned himself to take the crown, advancing the stance that women should be ineligible to succeed to the French throne. He won over his adversaries through his political sagacity and succeeded to the French throne as Philip V. When he died in 1322, leaving only daughters behind, the crown passed to his younger brother, Charles IV.

Royal families involved in the Hundred Years' War (1337–1453)

Valois (Capet)	Plantagenet	Blois	Capet	Évreux (Capet)
Charles; Count of Valois	Edward I "Longshanks"; King of England r. 1272–1307	Joan I Queen of Navarre r. 1274–1305	Philip IV "the Fair"; King of France r. 1285–1314; Philip I King of Navarre r. 1284–1305	Louis; Count of Évreux
Edward II; King of England r. 1307–1327	Isabella "She-Wolf of France"	Louis X King of France r. 1314–1316; Louis I King of Navarre r. 1305–1316	Philip V "the Tall"; King of France; Philip II; King of Navarre r. 1316–1322	Charles IV "the Fair"; King of France; Charles I "the Bald"; King of Navarre r. 1322–1328	Joan of Évreux
Philip VI "the Fortunate" "of Valois"; King of France r. 1328–1350	Joan of Valois	John I "the Posthumous"; King of France; King of Navarre r. 1316	Joan II; Queen of Navarre r. 1328–1349	Philip III "the Noble" "the Wise"; King of Navarre jure uxoris r. 1328–1343
John II "the Good"; King of France r. 1350–1364	Philippa of Hainault	Edward III; King of England r. 1327–1377	Joan of the Tower	David II; King of Scotland r. 1329–1371	Charles II "the Bad"; King of Navarre r. 1349–1387
Charles V "the Wise"; King of France r. 1364–1380	Philip the Bold; Duke of Burgundy	Edward of Woodstock "The Black Prince"	John of Gaunt	Edmund of Langley; Duke of York
Luxembourg
Charles VI "the Beloved" "the Mad"; King of France r. 1380–1422	Louis I Duke of Orléans	Charles IV; Holy Roman Emperor r. 1355–1378	Henry IV; King of England r. 1399–1413
Charles VII "the Victorious"; King of France r. 1422–1461	Isabella of Valois	Richard II; King of England r. 1377–1399	Anne of Bohemia	Catherine of Valois	Henry V King of England r. 1413–1422	Thomas of Lancaster; Duke of Clarence †Battle of Baugé
Henry VI; King of England r. 1422–1461, r. 1470–1471

Charles IV died in 1328, leaving behind his young daughter and pregnant wife, Joan of Évreux. He decreed that he would become king if the unborn child were male. If not, Charles left the choice of his successor to the nobles. Joan gave birth to a girl, Blanche of France (later Duchess of Orleans). With Charles IV's death and Blanche's birth, the main male line of the House of Capet was rendered extinct.

By proximity of blood, the nearest male relative of Charles IV was his nephew, Edward III of England. Edward was the son of Isabella, the sister of the dead Charles IV, but the question arose whether she could transmit a right to inherit that she did not possess. Moreover, the French nobility balked at the prospect of being ruled by an Englishman, especially one whose mother, Isabella, and her lover, Roger Mortimer, were widely suspected of having murdered the previous English king, Edward II. The French barons, prelates, and the University of Paris assemblies decided that males who derive their right to inheritance through their mother should be excluded from consideration. Therefore, excluding Edward, the nearest heir through the male line was Charles IV's first cousin, Philip, Count of Valois, and it was decided that he should take the throne. He was crowned Philip VI in 1328. In 1340, the Avignon papacy confirmed that, under Salic law, males would not be able to inherit through their mothers.

Eventually, Edward III reluctantly recognized Philip VI and paid him homage for the duchy of Aquitaine and Gascony in 1329. He made concessions in Guyenne but reserved the right to reclaim territories arbitrarily confiscated. After that, he expected to be left undisturbed while he made war on Scotland.

=== Dispute over Guyenne: a problem of sovereignty ===
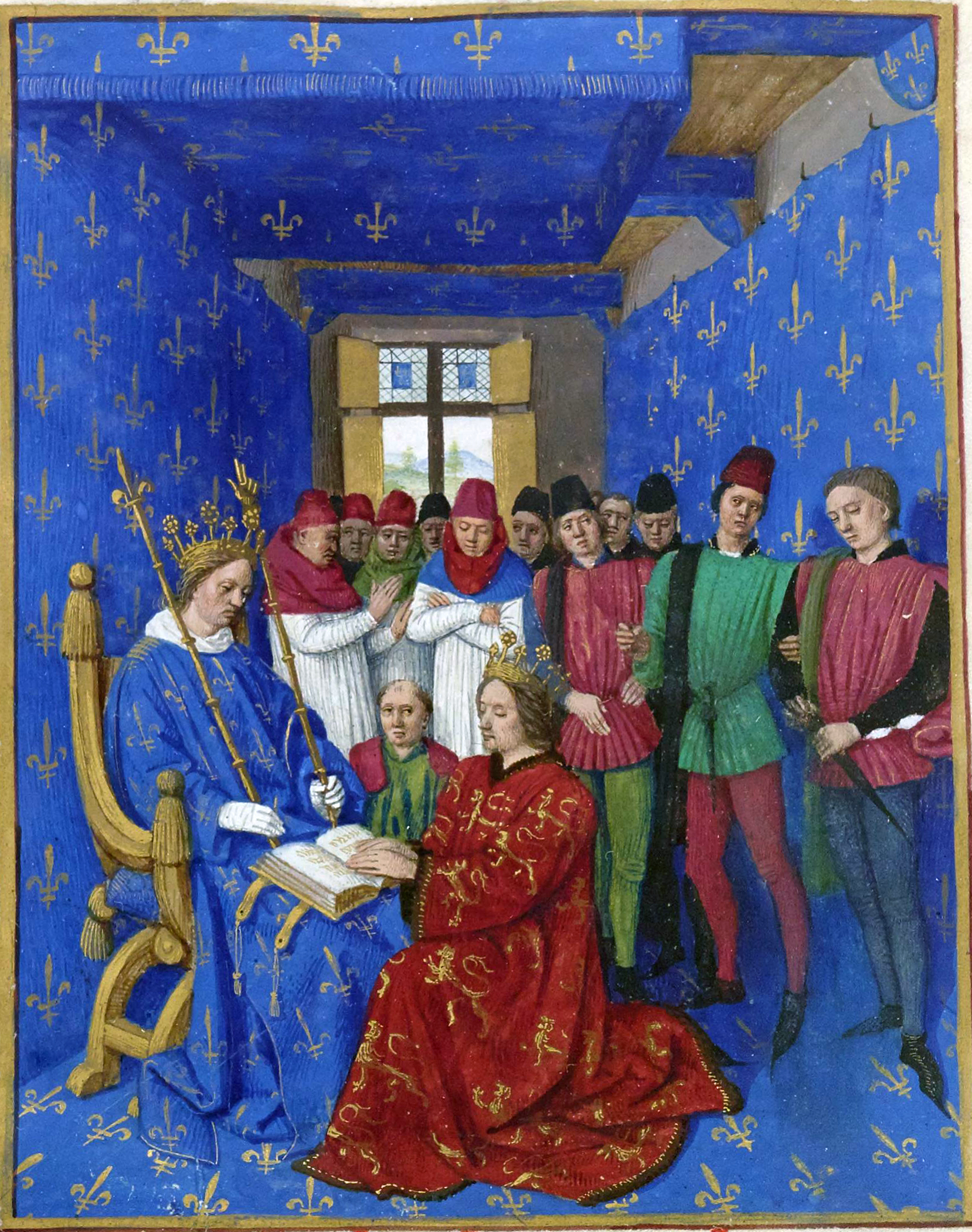
Homage of Edward I of England (kneeling) to Philip IV of France (seated), 1286. As Duke of Aquitaine, Edward was also a vassal to the French king (illumination by Jean Fouquet from the Grandes Chroniques de France in the Bibliothèque Nationale de France, Paris).

Tensions between the French and English monarchies can be traced back to the 1066 Norman Conquest of England, in which the English throne was seized by the Duke of Normandy, a vassal of the King of France. As a result, the crown of England was held by a succession of nobles who already owned lands in France, which put them among the most influential subjects of the French king, as they could now draw upon the economic power of England to enforce their interests in the mainland. To the kings of France, this threatened their royal authority, and so they would constantly try to undermine English rule in France, while the English monarchs would struggle to protect and expand their lands. This clash of interests was the root cause of much of the conflict between the French and English monarchies throughout the medieval era.

The Anglo-Norman dynasty that had ruled England since the Norman conquest of 1066 was brought to an end when Henry, the son of Geoffrey of Anjou and Empress Matilda, and great-grandson of William the Conqueror, became the first of the Angevin kings of England in 1154 as Henry II. The Angevin kings ruled over what was later known as the Angevin Empire, which included more French territory than that under the kings of France. The Angevins still owed homage to the French king for these territories. From the 11th century, the Angevins had autonomy within their French domains, neutralizing the issue.

King John of England inherited the Angevin domains from his brother Richard I. However, Philip II of France acted decisively to exploit the weaknesses of John, both legally and militarily, and by 1204 had succeeded in taking control of much of the Angevin continental possessions. Following John's reign, the Battle of Bouvines (1214), the Saintonge War (1242), and finally the War of Saint-Sardos (1324), the English king's holdings on the continent, as Duke of Aquitaine, were limited roughly to provinces in Gascony (and Bordeaux).

The dispute over Guyenne is even more important than the dynastic question in explaining the outbreak of the war. Guyenne posed a significant problem to the kings of France and England: Edward III was a vassal of Philip VI of France because of his French possessions and was required to recognize the suzerainty of the King of France over them. In practical terms, a judgment in Guyenne might be subject to an appeal to the French royal court. The King of France had the power to revoke all legal decisions made by the King of England in Aquitaine, which was unacceptable to the English. Therefore, sovereignty over Guyenne was a latent conflict between the two monarchies for several generations.

During the War of Saint-Sardos, Charles of Valois, father of Philip VI, invaded Aquitaine on behalf of Charles IV and conquered the duchy after a local insurrection, which the French believed had been incited by Edward II of England. Charles IV grudgingly agreed to return this territory in 1325. Edward II had to compromise to recover his duchy: he sent his son, the future Edward III, to pay homage.

The King of France agreed to restore Guyenne, minus Agen, but the French delayed the return of the lands, which helped Philip VI. On 6 June 1329, Edward III finally paid homage to the King of France. However, at the ceremony, Philip VI had it recorded that the homage was not due to the fiefs detached from the duchy of Guyenne by Charles IV (especially Agen). For Edward, the homage did not imply the renunciation of his claim to the extorted lands.

=== Gascony under the King of England ===
France in 1330. France before 1214 French acquisitions until 1330 England and Guyenne/Gascony and other English territories as of 1330

In the 11th century, Gascony in southwest France had been incorporated into Aquitaine (also known as Guyenne or Guienne) and formed with it the province of Guyenne and Gascony (French: Guyenne-et-Gascogne). The Angevin kings of England became dukes of Aquitaine after Henry II married the former Queen of France, Eleanor of Aquitaine, in 1152, from which point the lands were held in vassalage to the French crown. By the 13th century, the terms Aquitaine, Guyenne and Gascony were virtually synonymous.

At the beginning of Edward III's reign on 1 February 1327, the only part of Aquitaine that remained in his hands was the Duchy of Gascony. The term Gascony came to be used for the territory held by the Angevin (Plantagenet) kings of England in southwest France, although they still used the title Duke of Aquitaine.

For the first 10 years of Edward III's reign, Gascony had been a significant friction point. The English argued that, as Charles IV had not acted properly towards his tenant, Edward should be able to hold the duchy free of French suzerainty. The French rejected this argument, so in 1329, the 17-year-old Edward III paid homage to Philip VI. Tradition demanded that vassals approach their liege unarmed, with heads bare. Edward protested by attending the ceremony wearing his crown and sword. Even after this pledge of homage, the French continued to pressure the English administration.

Gascony was not the only sore point. One of Edward's influential advisers was Robert III of Artois. Robert was an exile from the French court, having fallen out with Philip VI over an inheritance claim. He urged Edward to start a war to reclaim France, and was able to provide extensive intelligence on the French court.

=== Franco-Scot alliance ===
France was an ally of the Kingdom of Scotland as English kings had tried to subjugate the country for some time. In 1295, a treaty was signed between France and Scotland during the reign of Philip the Fair, known as the Auld Alliance. Charles IV formally renewed the treaty in 1326, promising Scotland that France would support the Scots if England invaded their country. Similarly, France would have Scotland's support if its own kingdom were attacked. Edward could not succeed in his plans for Scotland if the Scots could count on French support.

Philip VI had assembled a large naval fleet off Marseilles as part of an ambitious plan for a crusade to the Holy Land. However, the plan was abandoned and the fleet, including elements of the Scottish navy, moved to the English Channel off Normandy in 1336, threatening England. To deal with this crisis, Edward proposed that the English raise two armies, one to deal with the Scots "at a suitable time" and the other to proceed at once to Gascony. At the same time, ambassadors were to be sent to France with a proposed treaty for the French king.

== History ==
=== Beginning of the war: 1337–1360 ===
Animated map showing progress of the war (territorial changes and the most important battles between 1337 and 1453)

==== End of homage ====
At the end of April 1337, Philip of France was invited to meet the delegation from England but refused. The arrière-ban, a call to arms, was proclaimed throughout France starting on 30 April 1337. Then, in May 1337, Philip met with his Great Council in Paris. It was agreed that the Duchy of Aquitaine, effectively Gascony, should be taken back into the King's hands because Edward III was in breach of his obligations as a vassal and had sheltered the King's "mortal enemy" Robert d'Artois. Edward responded to the confiscation of Aquitaine by challenging Philip's right to the French throne.

When Charles IV died, Edward claimed the succession of the French throne through the right of his mother, Isabella (Charles IV's sister), daughter of Philip IV. His claim was considered invalidated by Edward's homage to Philip VI in 1329. Edward revived his claim and in 1340 formally assumed the title "King of France and the French Royal Arms".

On 26 January 1340, Edward III formally received homage from Guy, half-brother of the Count of Flanders. The civic authorities of Ghent, Ypres, and Bruges proclaimed Edward King of France. Edward aimed to strengthen his alliances with the Low Countries. His supporters could claim that they were loyal to the "true" King of France and did not rebel against Philip. In February 1340, Edward returned to England to try to raise more funds and also deal with political difficulties.

Relations with Flanders were also tied to the English wool trade since Flanders' principal cities relied heavily on textile production, and England supplied much of the raw material they needed. Edward III had commanded that his chancellor sit on the woolsack in council as a symbol of the pre-eminence of the wool trade. At the time there were about 110,000 sheep in Sussex alone. The great medieval English monasteries produced large wool surpluses sold to mainland Europe. Successive governments were able to make large amounts of money by taxing it. France's sea power led to economic disruptions for England, shrinking the wool trade to Flanders and the wine trade from Gascony.

==== Outbreak, the English Channel and Brittany ====
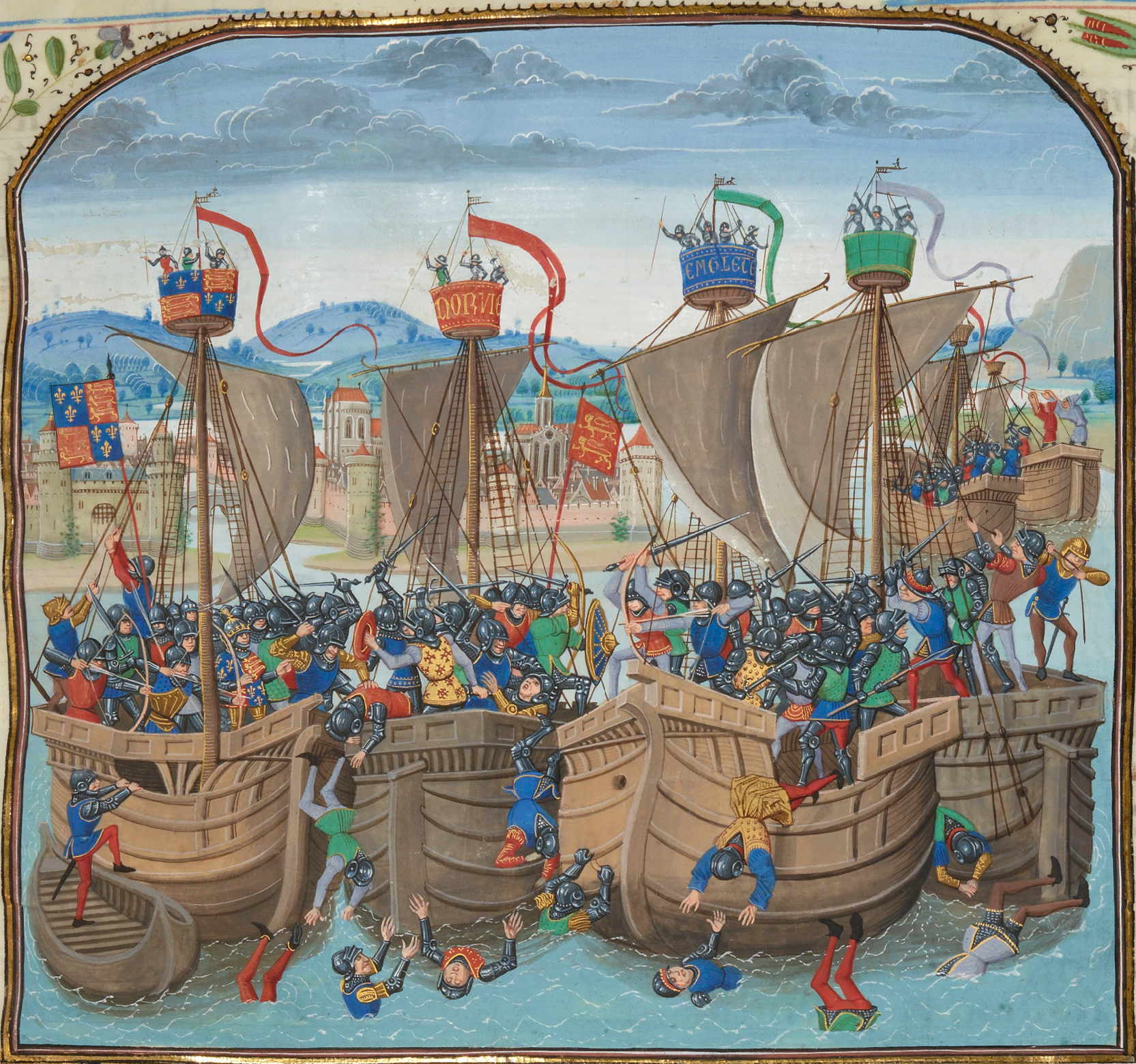
The Battle of Sluys from a BNF manuscript of Froissart's Chronicles, Bruges, c. 1470

On 22 June 1340, Edward and his fleet sailed from England and arrived off the Zwin estuary the next day. The French fleet assumed a defensive formation off the port of Sluis. The English fleet deceived the French into believing they were withdrawing. When the wind turned in the late afternoon, the English attacked with the wind and sun behind them. The French fleet was almost destroyed in what became known as the Battle of Sluys.

England dominated the English Channel for the rest of the war, preventing French invasions. At this point, Edward's funds ran out and the war probably would have ended were it not for the death of the Duke of Brittany in 1341 precipitating a succession dispute between the duke's half-brother John of Montfort and Charles of Blois, nephew of Philip VI.

In 1341, this inheritance dispute over the Duchy of Brittany set off the War of the Breton Succession, in which Edward backed John of Montfort and Philip backed Charles of Blois. Action for the next few years focused on a back-and-forth struggle in Brittany. The city of Vannes in Brittany changed hands several times, while further campaigns in Gascony met with mixed success for both sides. The English-backed Montfort finally took the duchy but not until 1364.

==== Battle of Crécy and the taking of Calais ====
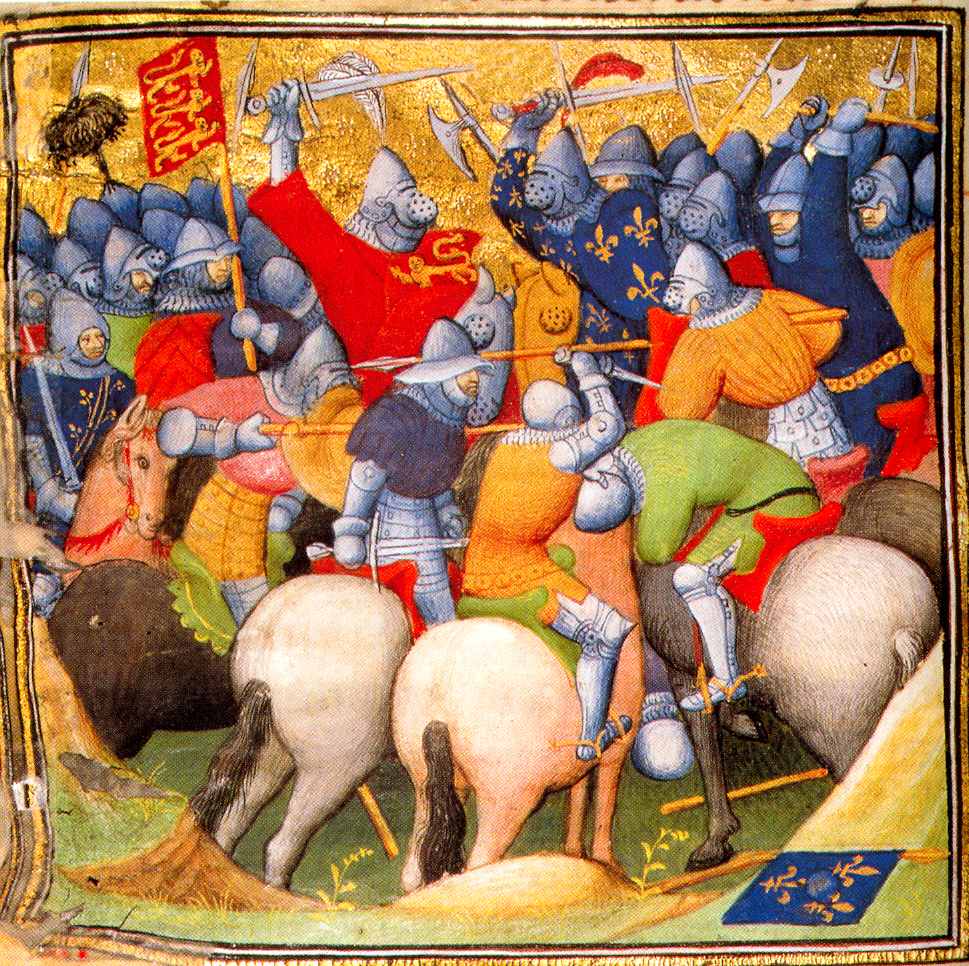
Battle of Crécy, 1346, from the Grandes Chroniques de France. British Library, London

In July 1346, Edward mounted a major invasion across the channel, landing on Normandy's Cotentin Peninsula at St Vaast. The English army captured the city of Caen in just one day, surprising the French. Philip mustered a large army to oppose Edward, who chose to march northward toward the Low Countries, pillaging as he went. He reached the river Seine to find most of the crossings destroyed. He moved further south, worryingly close to Paris until he found the crossing at Poissy. This had only been partially destroyed, so the carpenters within his army were able to fix it. He then continued to Flanders until he reached the river Somme. The army crossed at a tidal ford at Blanchetaque, stranding Philip's army. Edward, assisted by this head start, continued on his way to Flanders once more until, finding himself unable to outmaneuver Philip, Edward positioned his forces for battle, and Philip's army attacked.

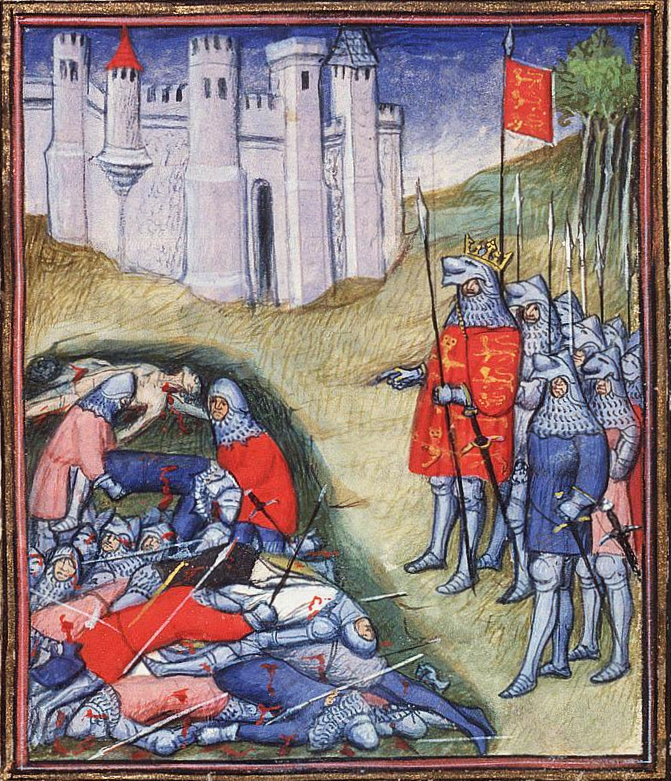
Edward III counting the dead on the battlefield of Crécy

The Battle of Crécy of 1346 was a complete disaster for the French, largely credited to the English longbowmen and the French king, who allowed his army to attack before it was ready. Philip appealed to his Scottish allies to help with a diversionary attack on England. King David II of Scotland responded by invading northern England, but his army was defeated, and he was captured at the Battle of Neville's Cross on 17 October 1346. This greatly reduced the threat from Scotland.

In France, Edward proceeded north unopposed and besieged the city of Calais on the English Channel, capturing it in 1347. This became an important strategic asset for the English, allowing them to keep troops safely in northern France. Calais would remain under English control, even after the end of the Hundred Years' War, until the successful French siege in 1558.

==== Battle of Poitiers ====
The Black Death, which had just arrived in Paris in 1348, ravaged Europe. In 1355, after the plague had passed and England was able to recover financially, King Edward's son and namesake, the Prince of Wales, later known as the Black Prince, led a chevauchée from Gascony into France, during which he pillaged Avignonet, Castelnaudary, Carcassonne, and Narbonne. The next year during another chevauchée he ravaged Auvergne, Limousin, and Berry but failed to take Bourges. He offered terms of peace to King John II of France (known as John the Good), who had outflanked him near Poitiers but refused to surrender himself as the price of their acceptance.

This led to the Battle of Poitiers (19 September 1356) where the Black Prince's army routed the French. During the battle, the Gascon noble Jean de Grailly, captal de Buch led a mounted unit that was concealed in a forest. The French advance was contained, at which point de Grailly led a flanking movement with his horsemen, cutting off the French retreat and successfully capturing King John and many of his nobles. With John held hostage, his son the Dauphin (later to become Charles V) assumed the powers of the king as regent.

After the Battle of Poitiers, many French nobles and mercenaries rampaged, and chaos ruled. A contemporary report recounted:

... all went ill with the kingdom and the State was undone. Thieves and robbers rose up everywhere in the land. The Nobles despised and hated all others and took no thought for usefulness and profit of lord and men. They subjected and despoiled the peasants and the men of the villages. In no wise did they defend their country from its enemies; rather did they trample it underfoot, robbing and pillaging the peasants' goods ...

— From the Chronicles of Jean de Venette

==== Reims campaign and Black Monday ====
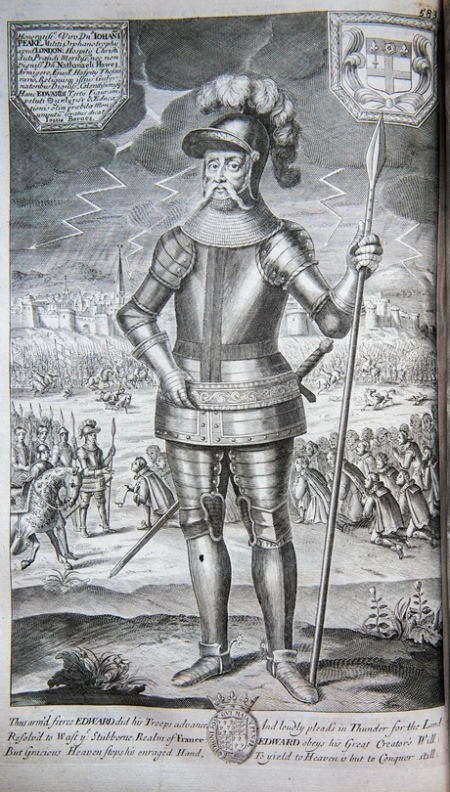
A later engraving of Black Monday in 1360: hailstorms and lightning ravage the English army outside Chartres

Edward invaded France, for the third and last time, hoping to capitalise on the discontent and seize the throne. The Dauphin's strategy was that of non-engagement with the English army in the field. However, Edward wanted the crown and chose the cathedral city of Reims for his coronation (Reims was the traditional coronation city). However, the citizens of Reims built and reinforced the city's defences before Edward and his army arrived. Edward besieged the city for five weeks, but the defences held and there was no coronation. Edward moved on to Paris, but retreated after a few skirmishes in the suburbs. Next was the town of Chartres.

Disaster struck in a freak hailstorm on the encamped army, causing over 1,000 English deaths – the so-called Black Monday at Easter 1360. This devastated Edward's army and forced him to negotiate when approached by the French. A conference was held at Brétigny that resulted in the Treaty of Brétigny (8 May 1360). The treaty was ratified at Calais in October. In return for increased lands in Aquitaine, Edward renounced Normandy, Touraine, Anjou and Maine and consented to reduce King John's ransom by a million crowns. Edward also abandoned his claim to the crown of France.

=== First peace: 1360–1369 ===
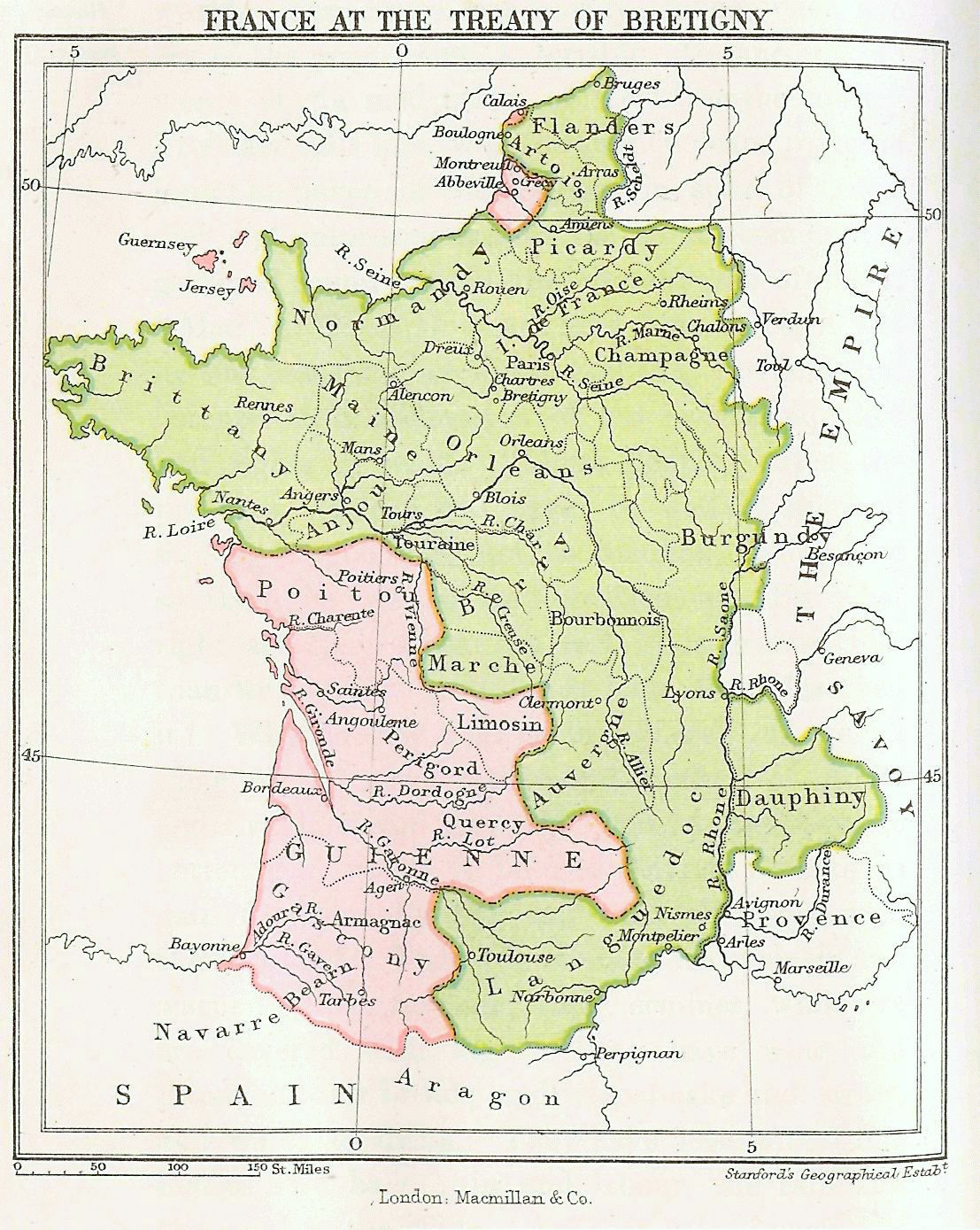
France at the Treaty of Brétigny, English holdings in light red

The French king, John II, was held captive in England for four years. The Treaty of Brétigny set his ransom at 3 million crowns and allowed for hostages to be held in lieu of John. The hostages included two of his sons, several princes and nobles, four inhabitants of Paris, and two citizens from each of the nineteen principal towns of France. While these hostages were held, John returned to France to try to raise funds to pay the ransom. In 1362, John's son Louis of Anjou, a hostage in English-held Calais, escaped captivity. With his stand-in hostage gone, John felt honour-bound to return to captivity in England.

The French crown had been at odds with Navarre (near southern Gascony) since 1354, and in 1363, the Navarrese used the captivity of John II in London and the political weakness of the Dauphin to try to seize power. Although there was no formal treaty, Edward III supported the Navarrese moves, particularly as there was a prospect that he might gain control over the northern and western provinces as a consequence. With this in mind, Edward deliberately slowed the peace negotiations. In 1364, John II died in London, while still in honourable captivity. Charles V succeeded him as king of France. On 16 May, one month after the dauphin's accession and three days before his coronation as Charles V, the Navarrese suffered a crushing defeat at the Battle of Cocherel.

=== French ascendancy under Charles V: 1369–1389 ===
==== Aquitaine and Castile ====
In 1366, there was a civil war of succession in Castile (part of modern Spain). The forces of the ruler Peter of Castile were pitched against those of his half-brother Henry of Trastámara. The English crown supported Peter; the French supported Henry. French forces were led by Bertrand du Guesclin, a Breton, who rose from relatively humble beginnings to prominence as one of France's war leaders. Charles V provided a force of 12,000, with du Guesclin at their head, to support Trastámara in his invasion of Castile.

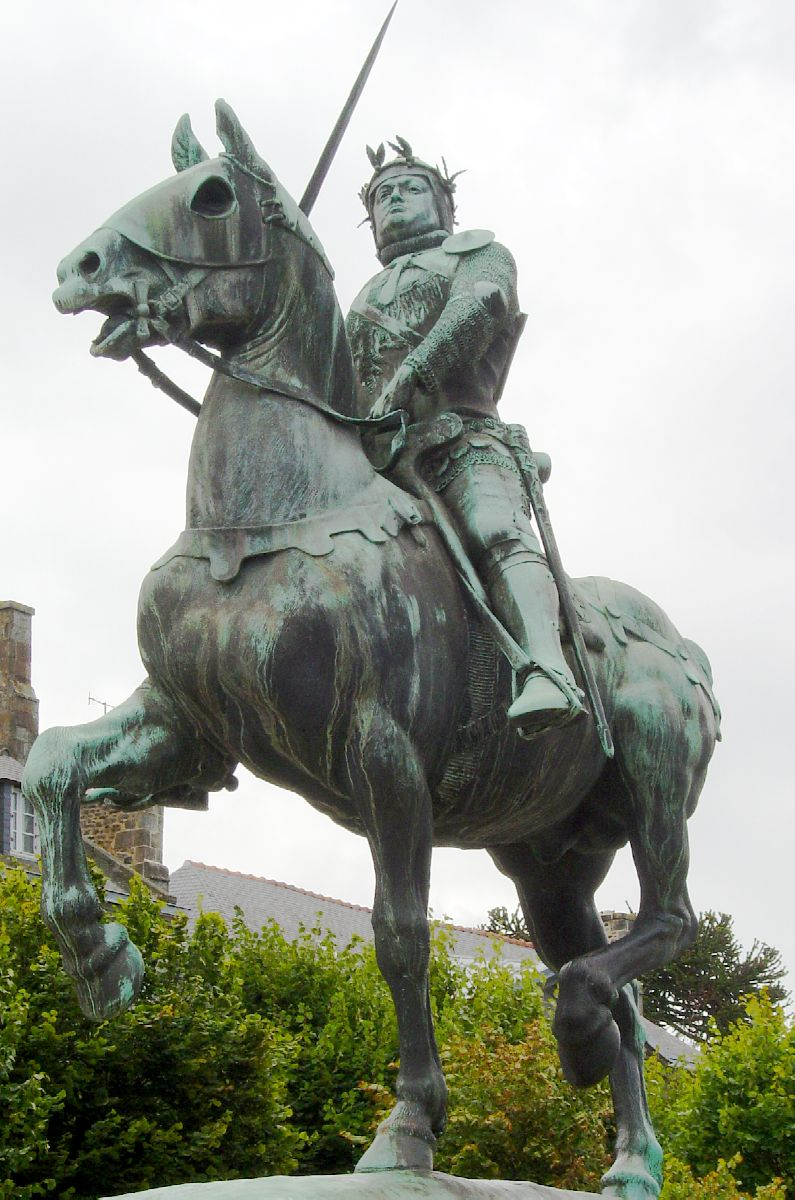
Statue of Bertrand du Guesclin in Dinan, Brittany

Peter appealed to England and Aquitaine's Black Prince, Edward of Woodstock, for help, but none was forthcoming, forcing Peter into exile in Aquitaine. The Black Prince had previously agreed to support Peter's claims but concerns over the terms of the treaty of Brétigny led him to assist Peter as a representative of Aquitaine, rather than England. He then led an Anglo-Gascon army into Castile. Peter was restored to power after Trastámara's army was defeated at the Battle of Nájera.

Although the Castilians had agreed to fund the Black Prince, they failed to do so. The Prince was suffering from ill health and returned with his army to Aquitaine. To pay off debts incurred during the Castile campaign, the prince instituted a hearth tax. Arnaud-Amanieu VIII, Lord of Albret had fought on the Black Prince's side during the war. Albret, who already had become discontented by the influx of English administrators into the enlarged Aquitaine, refused to allow the tax to be collected in his fief. He then joined a group of Gascon lords who appealed to Charles V for support in their refusal to pay the tax. Charles V summoned one Gascon lord and the Black Prince to hear the case in his High Court in Paris. The Black Prince answered that he would go to Paris with sixty thousand men behind him. War broke out again and Edward III resumed the title of King of France. Charles V declared that all the English possessions in France were forfeited, and before the end of 1369 all of Aquitaine was in full revolt.

With the Black Prince gone from Castile, Henry of Trastámara led a second invasion that ended with Peter's death at the Battle of Montiel in March 1369. The new Castilian regime provided naval support to French campaigns against Aquitaine and England and England backed John of Gaunt's claim to the Castilan throne. In 1372, the Castilian fleet defeated the English fleet in the Battle of La Rochelle.

==== 1373 campaign of John of Gaunt ====
In August 1373, John of Gaunt, accompanied by John de Montfort, Duke of Brittany led a force of 9,000 men from Calais on a chevauchée. While initially successful as French forces were insufficiently concentrated to oppose them, the English met more resistance as they moved south. French forces began to concentrate around the English force but under orders from Charles V, the French avoided a set battle. Instead, they fell on forces detached from the main body to raid or forage. The French shadowed the English and in October, the English found themselves trapped against the River Allier by four French forces. With some difficulty, the English crossed at the bridge at Moulins but lost all their baggage and loot. The English carried on south across the Limousin plateau but the weather was turning severe. Men and horses died in great numbers and many soldiers, forced to march on foot, discarded their armour. At the beginning of December, the English army entered friendly territory in Gascony. By the end of December, they were in Bordeaux, starving, ill-equipped, and having lost over half of the 30,000 horses with which they had left Calais. Although the march across France had been a remarkable feat, it was a military failure.

==== English turmoil ====
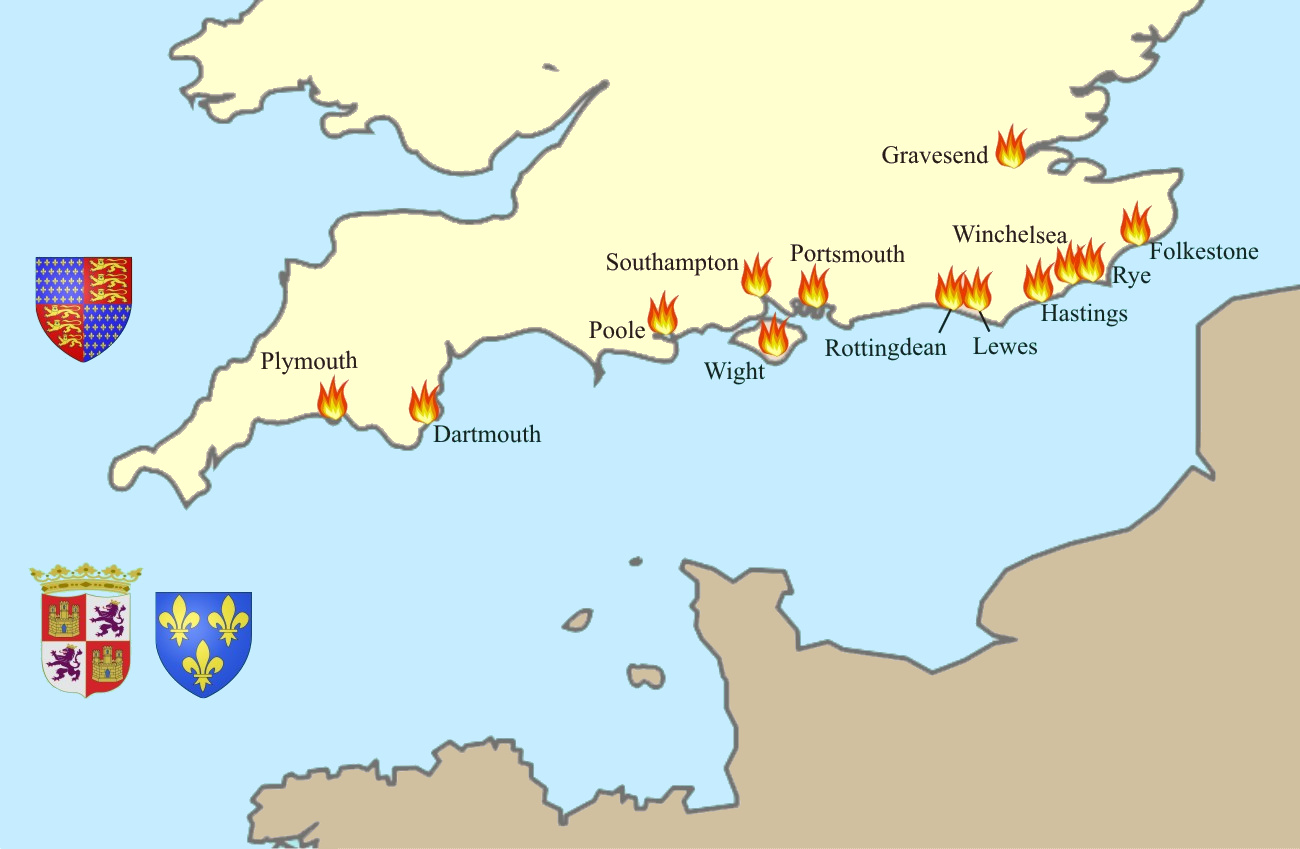
The Franco-Castilian Navy, led by Admirals de Vienne and Tovar, managed to raid the English coasts for the first time since the beginning of the Hundred Years' War.

With his health deteriorating, the Black Prince returned to England in January 1371, where his father Edward III was elderly and also in poor health. The prince's illness was debilitating, and he died on 8 June 1376. Edward III died the following year on 21 June 1377 and was succeeded by the Black Prince's second son Richard II who was still a child of 10 (Edward of Angoulême, the Black Prince's first son, had died sometime earlier). The treaty of Brétigny had left Edward III and England with enlarged holdings in France, but a small professional French army under the leadership of du Guesclin pushed the English back; by the time Charles V died in 1380, the English held only Calais and a few other ports.

It was usual to appoint a regent in the case of a child monarch but no regent was appointed for Richard II, who nominally exercised the power of kingship from the date of his accession in 1377. Between 1377 and 1380, actual power was in the hands of a series of councils. The political community preferred this to a regency led by the king's uncle, John of Gaunt, although Gaunt remained highly influential. Richard faced many challenges during his reign, including the Peasants' Revolt led by Wat Tyler in 1381 and an Anglo-Scottish war in 1384–1385. His attempts to raise taxes, including poll taxes, to pay for his Scottish adventure and for the protection of Calais against the French made him increasingly unpopular.

===== 1380 campaign of the Earl of Buckingham =====
In July 1380, the Earl of Buckingham commanded an expedition to France to aid England's ally, the Duke of Brittany. The French refused battle before the walls of Troyes on 25 August; Buckingham's forces continued their chevauchée and in November laid siege to Nantes. The support expected from the Duke of Brittany did not appear and in the face of severe losses in men and horses, Buckingham was forced to abandon the siege in January 1381. In February, reconciled to the regime of the new French king Charles VI by the Treaty of Guérande, Brittany paid 50,000 francs to Buckingham for him to abandon the siege and the campaign.

==== French turmoil ====
After the deaths of Charles V and du Guesclin in 1380, France lost its main leadership and overall momentum in the war. Charles VI succeeded his father as king of France at the age of 11, and he was thus put under a regency led by his uncles, who managed to maintain an effective grip on government affairs until about 1388, well after Charles had achieved royal majority.

With France facing widespread destruction, plague, and economic recession, high taxation put a heavy burden on the French peasantry and urban communities. The war effort against England largely depended on royal taxation, but the population was increasingly unwilling to pay for it, as would be demonstrated at the Harelle and Maillotin revolts in 1382. Charles V had abolished many of these taxes on his deathbed, but subsequent attempts to reinstate them stirred up hostility between the French government and populace.

Philip II of Burgundy, the uncle of the French king, brought together a Burgundian-French army and a fleet of 1,200 ships near the Zeeland town of Sluis in the summer and autumn of 1386 to attempt an invasion of England, but this venture failed. However, Philip's brother John of Berry appeared deliberately late, so that the autumn weather prevented the fleet from leaving and the invading army then dispersed again.

Difficulties in raising taxes and revenue hampered the ability of the French to fight the English. At this point, the war's pace had largely slowed down, and both nations found themselves fighting mainly through proxy wars, such as during the 1383–1385 Portuguese interregnum. The independence party in the Kingdom of Portugal, which was supported by the English, won against the supporters of the King of Castile's claim to the Portuguese throne, who in turn was backed by the French.

=== Second peace: 1389–1415 ===
France in 1388, just before signing a truce. English territories are shown in red, French royal territories are dark blue, papal territories are orange, and French vassals have the other colours.

The war became increasingly unpopular with the English public due to the high taxes needed for the war effort. These taxes were seen as one of the reasons for the Peasants' Revolt. Richard II's indifference to the war together with his preferential treatment of a select few close friends and advisors angered an alliance of lords that included one of his uncles. This group, known as Lords Appellant, managed to press charges of treason against five of Richard's advisors and friends in the Merciless Parliament. The Lords Appellant were able to gain control of the council in 1388 but failed to reignite the war in France. Although the will was there, the funds to pay the troops was lacking, so in the autumn of 1388 the Council agreed to resume negotiations with the French crown, beginning on 18 June 1389 with the signing of the three-year Truce of Leulinghem.

In 1389, Richard's uncle and supporter, John of Gaunt, returned from Spain and Richard was able to rebuild his power gradually until 1397, when he reasserted his authority and destroyed the principal three among the Lords Appellant. In 1399, after John of Gaunt died, Richard II disinherited Gaunt's son, the exiled Henry of Bolingbroke. Bolingbroke returned to England with his supporters, deposed Richard and had himself crowned Henry IV. In Scotland, the problems brought in by the English regime change prompted border raids that were countered by an invasion in 1402 and the defeat of a Scottish army at the Battle of Homildon Hill. A dispute over the spoils between Henry and Henry Percy, 1st Earl of Northumberland, resulted in a long and bloody struggle between the two for control of northern England, resolved only with the almost complete destruction of the House of Percy by 1408.

In Wales, Owain Glyndŵr was declared Prince of Wales on 16 September 1400. He was the leader of the most serious and widespread rebellion against England authority in Wales since the conquest of 1282–1283. In 1405, the French allied with Glyndŵr and the Castilians in Spain; a Franco-Welsh army advanced as far as Worcester, while the Spaniards used galleys to raid and burn all the way from Cornwall to Southampton, before taking refuge in Harfleur for the winter. The Glyndŵr Rising was finally put down in 1415 and resulted in Welsh semi-independence for a number of years.

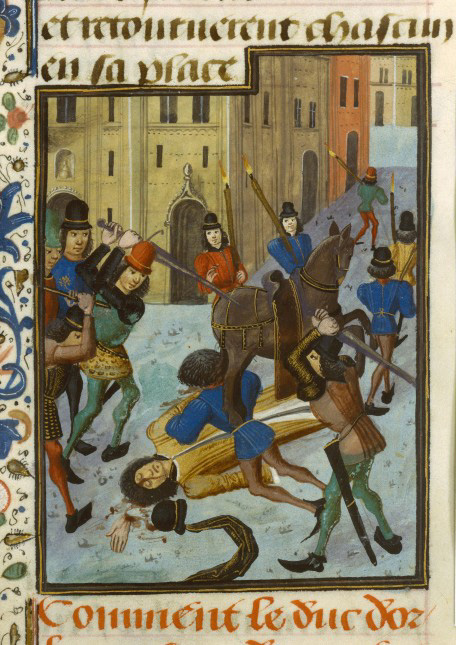
Assassination of Louis I, Duke of Orléans, in Paris in 1407

In 1392, Charles VI suddenly descended into madness, forcing France into a regency dominated by his uncles and his brother. A conflict for control over the Regency began between his uncle Philip the Bold, Duke of Burgundy and his brother, Louis of Valois, Duke of Orléans. After Philip's death, his son and heir John the Fearless continued the struggle against Louis but with the disadvantage of having no close relation to the king. Finding himself outmanoeuvred politically, John ordered the assassination of Louis in retaliation. His involvement in the murder was quickly revealed and the Armagnac family took political power in opposition to John. By 1410, both sides were bidding for the help of English forces in a civil war. In 1418 Paris was taken by the Burgundians, who were unable to stop the massacre of Count of Armagnac and his followers by a Parisian crowd, with an estimated death toll between 1,000 and 5,000.

Throughout this period, England confronted repeated raids by pirates that damaged trade and the navy. There is some evidence that Henry IV used state-legalised piracy as a form of warfare in the English Channel. He used such privateering campaigns to pressure enemies without risking open war. The French responded in kind and French pirates, under Scottish protection, raided many English coastal towns. The domestic and dynastic difficulties faced by England and France in this period quieted the war for a decade. Henry IV died in 1413 and was replaced by his eldest son Henry V. The mental illness of Charles VI of France allowed his power to be exercised by royal princes whose rivalries caused deep divisions in France. In 1414 while Henry held court at Leicester, he received ambassadors from Burgundy. Henry accredited envoys to the French king to make clear his territorial claims in France; he also demanded the hand of Charles VI's youngest daughter Catherine of Valois. The French rejected his demands, leading Henry to prepare for war.

=== Resumption of the war under Henry V: 1415–1429 ===
==== Burgundian alliance and the seizure of Paris ====
===== Battle of Agincourt (1415) =====
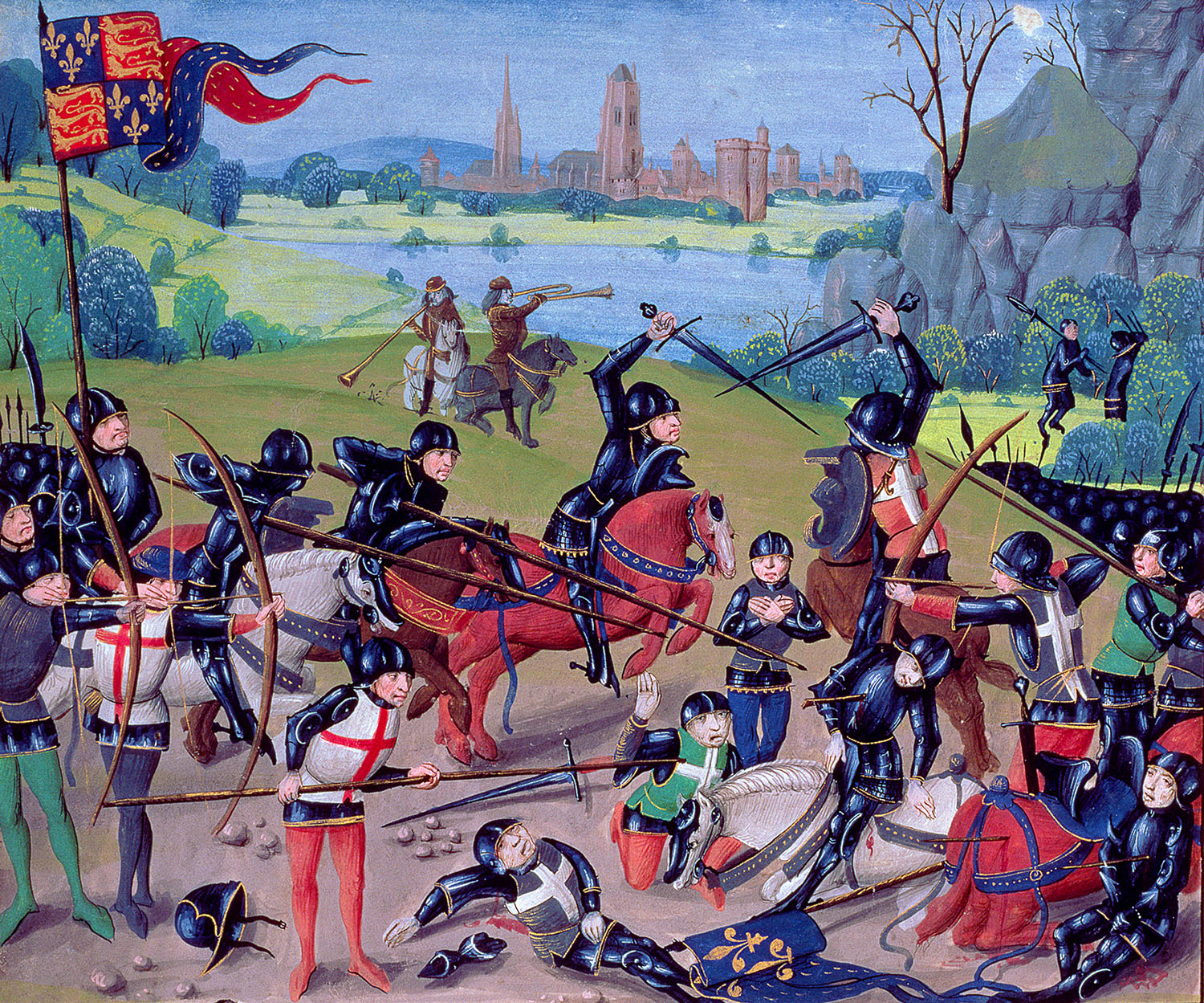
Fifteenth-century miniature depicting the Battle of Agincourt in October 1415

In August 1415, Henry V sailed from England with a force of about 10,500 and laid siege to Harfleur. The city resisted for longer than expected, but finally surrendered on 22 September. Because of the unexpected delay, most of the campaign season was gone. Rather than march on Paris directly, Henry elected to make a raiding expedition across France toward English-occupied Calais. In a campaign reminiscent of Crécy, he found himself outmanoeuvred and low on supplies and had to fight a much larger French army at the Battle of Agincourt, north of the Somme. Despite the problems and having a smaller force, his victory was near total; the French defeat was catastrophic, costing the lives of many of the Armagnac leaders. About 40% of the French nobility was killed. Henry was apparently concerned that the large number of prisoners taken were a security risk (there were more French prisoners than there were soldiers in the entire English army) and he ordered their deaths before the French reserves fled the field and Henry rescinded the order.

===== Treaty of Troyes (1420) =====
Henry retook much of Normandy, including Caen in 1417, and Rouen on 19 January 1419, turning Normandy English for the first time in two centuries. A formal alliance was made with Burgundy, which had taken Paris in 1418 before the assassination of Duke John the Fearless in 1419. In 1420, Henry met with King Charles VI. They signed the Treaty of Troyes, by which Henry finally married Charles' daughter Catherine of Valois and Henry's heirs would inherit the throne of France. The Dauphin, Charles VII, was declared illegitimate. Henry formally entered Paris later that year and the agreement was ratified by the Estates-General (French: Les États-Généraux).

===== Death of the Duke of Clarence (1421) =====
Clan Carmichael crest with a broken lance commemorating the unseating of the Duke of Clarence, leading to his death at the Battle of Baugé

On 22 March 1421 Henry V's progress in his French campaign experienced an unexpected reversal. Henry had left his brother and presumptive heir Thomas, Duke of Clarence in charge while he returned to England. The Duke of Clarence engaged a Franco-Scottish force of 5,000 men, led by Gilbert Motier de La Fayette and John Stewart, Earl of Buchan at the Battle of Baugé. The Duke of Clarence, against the advice of his lieutenants, before his army had been fully assembled, attacked with a force of no more than 1,500 men-at-arms. Then, during the course of the battle, he led a charge of a few hundred men into the main body of the Franco-Scottish army, who quickly enveloped the English. In the ensuing mêlée, the Scot, John Carmichael of Douglasdale, broke his lance unhorsing the Duke of Clarence. Once on the ground, the duke was slain by Alexander Buchanan. The body of the Duke of Clarence was recovered from the field by Thomas Montacute, 4th Earl of Salisbury, who conducted the English retreat.

==== English success ====
Henry V returned to France and went to Paris, then visiting Chartres and Gâtinais before returning to Paris. From there, he decided to attack the Dauphin-held town of Meaux. It turned out to be more difficult to overcome than first thought. The siege began about 6 October 1421, and the town held for seven months before finally falling on 11 May 1422.

At the end of May, Henry was joined by his queen and together with the French court, they went to rest at Senlis. While there, it became apparent that he was ill (possibly dysentery), and when he set out to the Upper Loire, he diverted to the royal castle at Vincennes, near Paris, where he died on 31 August. The elderly and insane Charles VI of France died two months later on 21 October. Henry left an only child, his nine-month-old son, Henry, later to become Henry VI.

On his deathbed, as Henry VI was only an infant, Henry V had given the Duke of Bedford responsibility for English France. The war in France continued under Bedford's generalship and several battles were won. The English won an emphatic victory at the Battle of Verneuil (17 August 1424). At the Battle of Baugé, the Duke of Clarence had rushed into battle without the support of his archers; by contrast, at Verneuil the archers fought to devastating effect against the Franco-Scottish army. The effect of the battle was to virtually destroy the Dauphin's field army and to eliminate the Scots as a significant military force for the rest of the war.

=== French victory: 1429–1453 ===
==== Joan of Arc and French revival ====
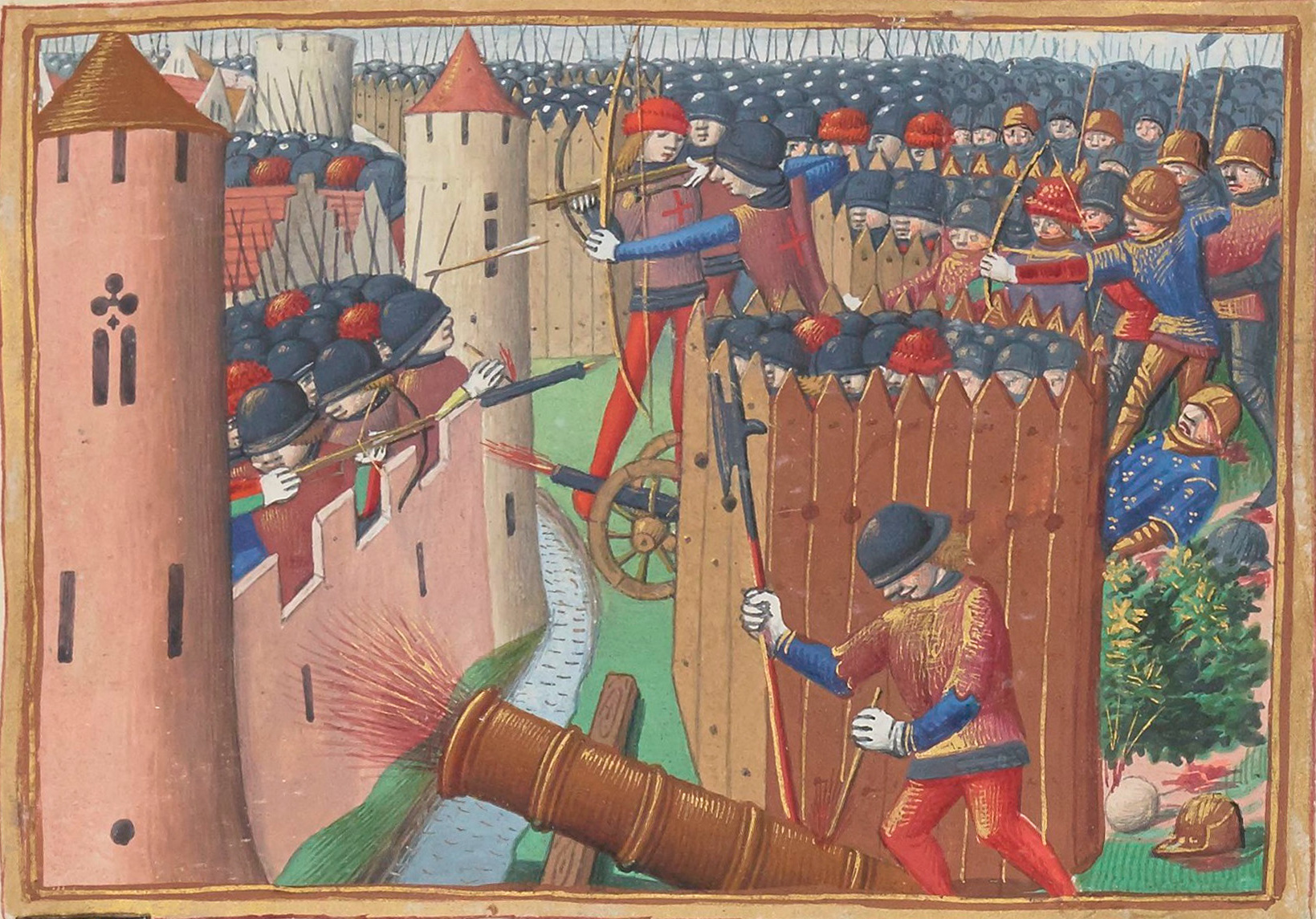
The first Western image of a battle with cannon: the Siege of Orléans in 1429. From Les Vigiles de Charles VII, Bibliothèque nationale de France, Paris.

The English laid siege to Orléans in October 1428, which created a stalemate for months. Food shortages within the city led to the likelihood that the city would be forced to surrender. In April 1429 Joan of Arc persuaded the Dauphin to send her to the siege, stating she had received visions from God telling her to drive out the English. She entered the city on April 29, after which the tide began to turn against the English within a matter of days. She raised the morale of the troops, and they attacked the English redoubts, forcing the English to lift the siege. Inspired by Joan, the French took several English strongholds on the Loire River.

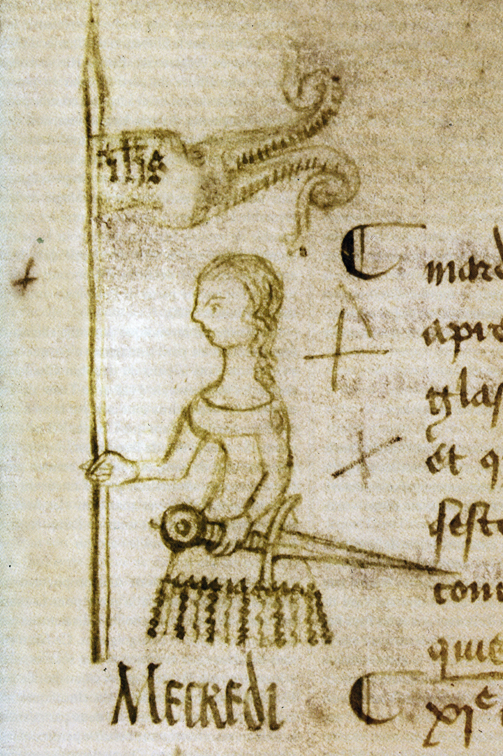
Joan of Arc pictured in 1429

The English retreated from the Loire Valley, pursued by a French army. Near the village of Patay, French cavalry broke through a unit of English longbowmen that had been sent to block the road, then swept through the retreating English army. The English lost 2,200 men, and the commander, John Talbot, 1st Earl of Shrewsbury, was taken prisoner. This victory opened the way for the Dauphin to march to Reims for his coronation as Charles VII, on 16 July 1429.

After the coronation, Charles VII's army fared less well. An attempted French siege of Paris was defeated on 8 September 1429, and Charles VII withdrew to the Loire Valley.

==== Henry's coronations and the desertion of Burgundy ====
Henry VI was crowned king of England at Westminster Abbey on 5 November 1429 and king of France at Notre-Dame, in Paris, on 16 December 1431.

Joan of Arc was captured by the Burgundians at the siege of Compiègne on 23 May 1430. The Burgundians then transferred her to the English, who organised a trial headed by Pierre Cauchon, Bishop of Beauvais and a collaborator with the English government who served as a member of the English Council at Rouen. Joan was convicted and burned at the stake on 30 May 1431 (she was rehabilitated 25 years later by Pope Callixtus III).

After the death of Joan of Arc, the fortunes of war turned dramatically against the English. Most of Henry's royal advisers were against making peace. Among the factions, the Duke of Bedford wanted to defend Normandy, the Duke of Gloucester was committed to just Calais, whereas Cardinal Beaufort was inclined to peace. Negotiations stalled. It seems that at the congress of Arras, in the summer of 1435, where the duke of Beaufort was mediator, the English were unrealistic in their demands. A few days after the congress ended in September, Philip the Good, duke of Burgundy, deserted to Charles VII, signing the Treaty of Arras that returned Paris to the King of France. This was a major blow to English sovereignty in France. The Duke of Bedford died on 14 September 1435 and was later replaced by Richard Plantagenet, 3rd Duke of York.

==== French resurgence ====
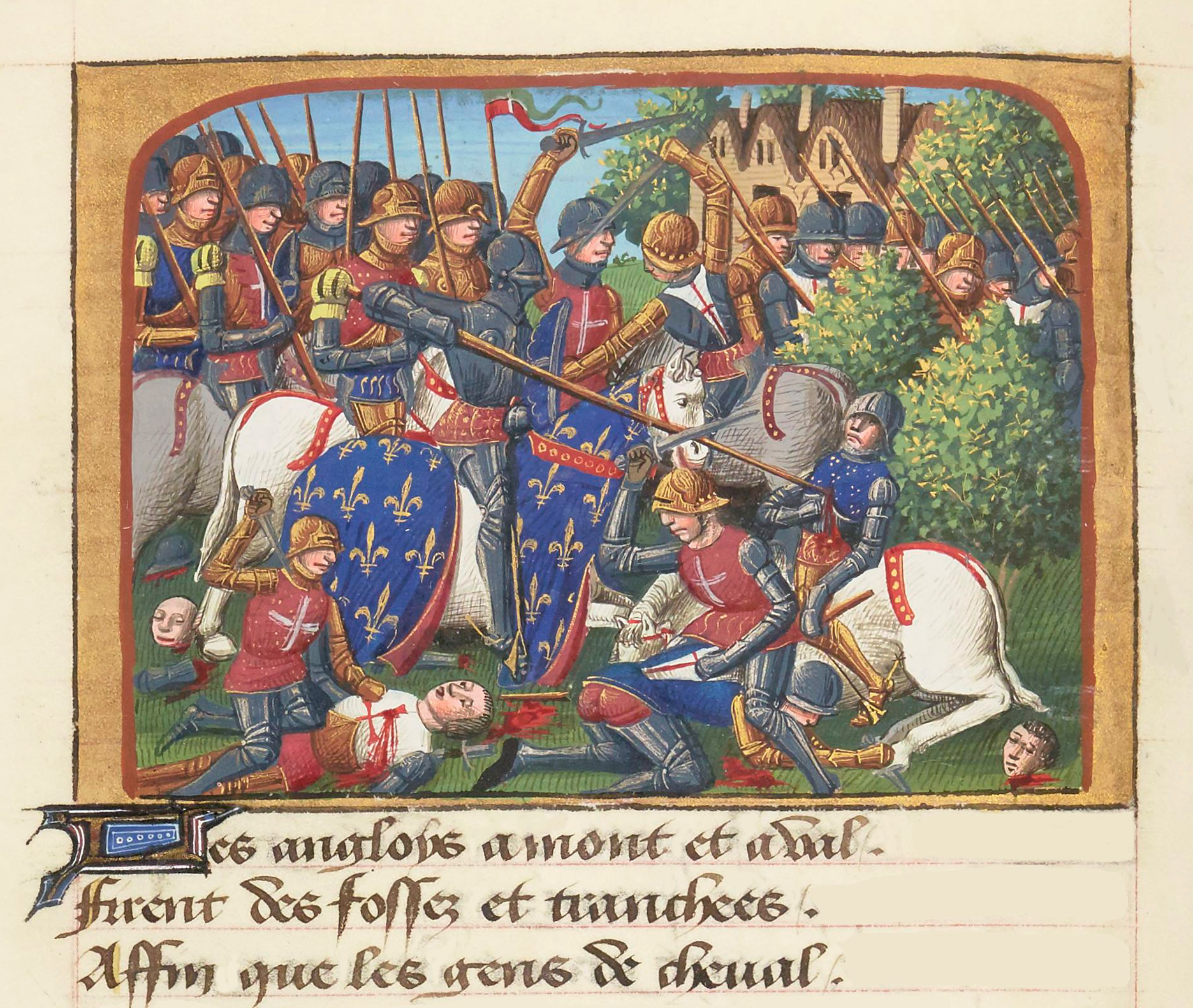
The French victory at the Battle of Formigny (1450)

The allegiance of Burgundy remained fickle, but the Burgundian focus on expanding their domains in the Low Countries left them little energy to intervene in the rest of France. The long truces that marked the war gave Charles time to centralise the French state and reorganise his army and government, replacing his feudal levies with a more modern professional army that could put its superior numbers to good use. A castle that once could only be captured after a prolonged siege would now fall after a few days from cannon bombardment. The French artillery developed a reputation as the best in the world.

By 1449, the French had retaken Rouen. In 1450 the Count of Clermont and Arthur de Richemont, Earl of Richmond, of the Montfort family (the future Arthur III, Duke of Brittany), caught an English army attempting to relieve Caen and defeated it at the Battle of Formigny in 1450. Richemont's force attacked the English army from the flank and rear just as they were on the verge of beating Clermont's army.

==== French conquest of Gascony ====
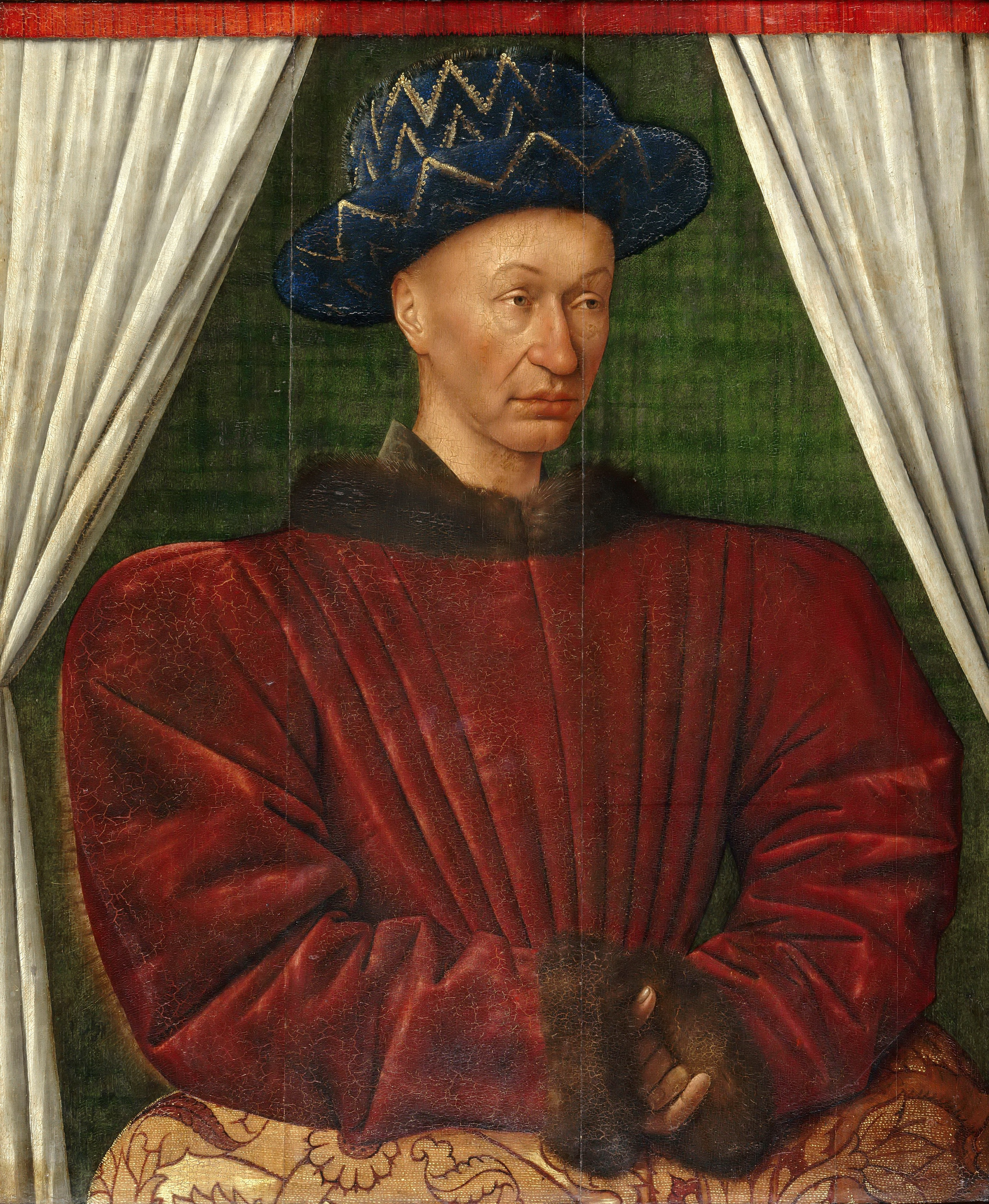
Charles "the Victorious" by Jean Fouquet. Louvre, Paris.

After Charles VII's successful Normandy campaign in 1450, he concentrated his efforts on Gascony, the last province held by the English. Bordeaux, Gascony's capital, was besieged and surrendered to the French on 30 June 1451. Largely due to the English sympathies of the Gascon people, this was reversed when John Talbot and his army retook the city on 23 October 1452. However, the English were decisively defeated at the Battle of Castillon on 17 July 1453. Talbot had been persuaded to engage the French army at Castillon near Bordeaux. During the battle the French appeared to retreat towards their camp. The French camp at Castillon had been laid out by Charles VII's ordinance officer Jean Bureau and this was instrumental in the French success as when the French cannon opened fire, from their positions in the camp, the English took severe casualties losing both Talbot and his son.

==== End of the war ====
Although the Battle of Castillon is considered the last battle of the Hundred Years' War, England and France remained formally at war for another 20 years, but the English were in no position to carry on the war as they faced unrest at home. Bordeaux fell to the French on 19 October and there were no more hostilities afterwards. Following defeat in the Hundred Years' War, English landowners complained vociferously about the financial losses resulting from the loss of their continental holdings; this is often considered a major cause of the Wars of the Roses that started in 1455.

The Hundred Years' War almost resumed in 1474, when the duke Charles of Burgundy, counting on English support, took up arms against Louis XI. Louis managed to isolate the Burgundians by buying Edward IV of England off with a large cash sum and an annual pension, in the Treaty of Picquigny (1475). The treaty formally ended the Hundred Years' War with Edward renouncing his claim to the throne of France. Kings of England (and later of Great Britain) continued to claim the title until 1803, when they were dropped in deference to the exiled Count of Provence, titular King Louis XVIII, who was living in England after the French Revolution.

== Significance ==
=== Historical significance ===
Burgundian territories (orange/yellow) and limits of France (red) after the Burgundian War

The French victory marked the end of a long period of instability that had begun with the Norman Conquest (1066), when William the Conqueror added "King of England" to his titles, becoming both the vassal to (as Duke of Normandy) and the equal of (as king of England) the king of France.

When the war ended, England was bereft of its continental possessions, leaving it with only Calais on the Continent (until 1558). The war destroyed the English dream of a joint monarchy and led to the rejection in England of all things French, although the Anglo-Norman, which had served as the language of the ruling classes and commerce there from the time of the Norman conquest, left its mark in English vocabulary. English became the official language in 1362 and French was no longer used for teaching from 1385.

National feeling that emerged from the war unified both France and England further. Despite the devastation on its soil, the Hundred Years' War accelerated the process of transforming France from a feudal monarchy to a centralised state. In England the political and financial troubles which emerged from the defeat were a major cause of the Wars of the Roses (1455–1487).

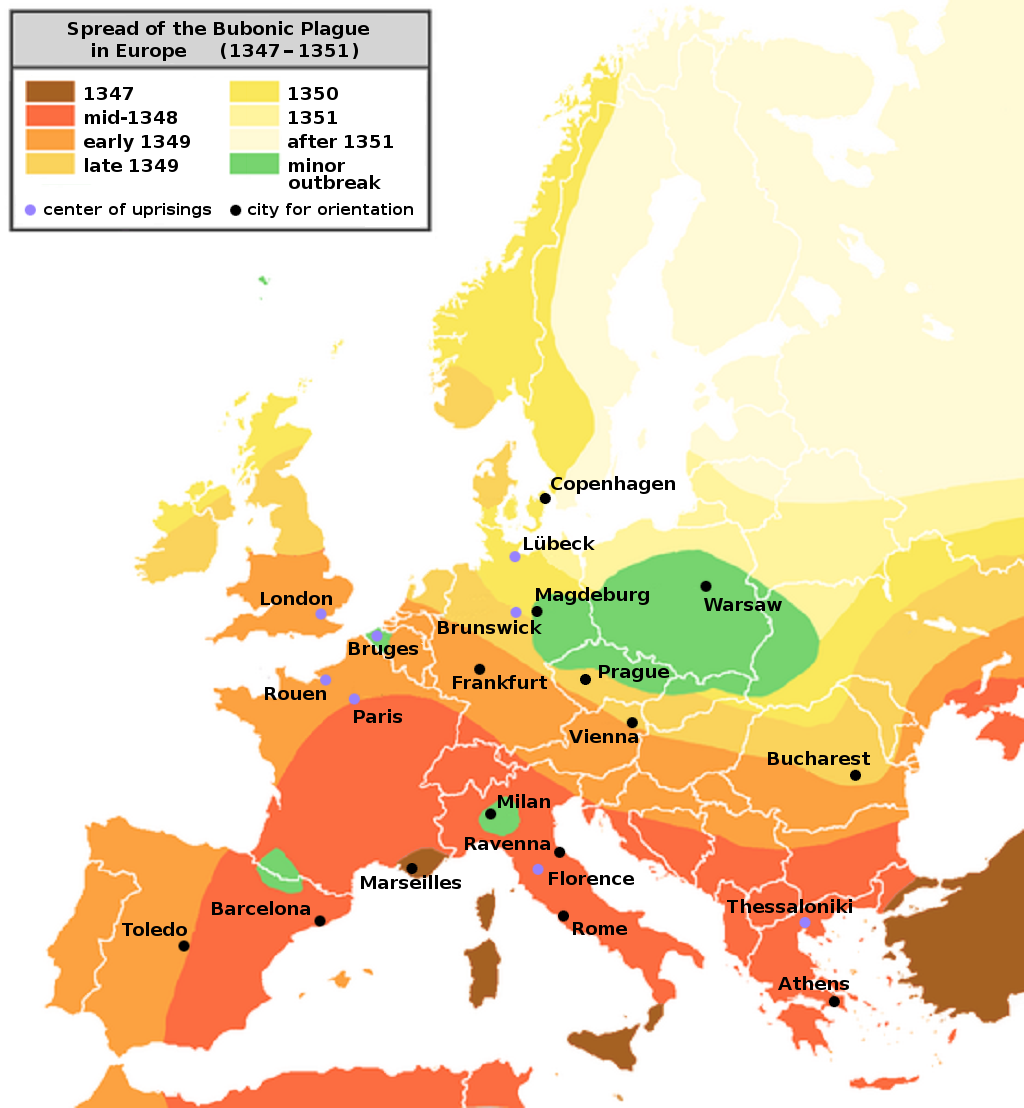
The spread of the Black Death (with modern borders)

Historian Ben Lowe argued in 1997 that opposition to the war helped to shape England's early modern political culture. Although anti-war and pro-peace spokesmen generally failed to influence outcomes at the time, they had a long-term impact. England showed decreasing enthusiasm for conflict deemed not in the national interest, yielding only losses in return for high economic burdens. In comparing this English cost-benefit analysis with French attitudes, given that both countries suffered from weak leaders and undisciplined soldiers, Lowe noted that the French understood that warfare was necessary to expel the foreigners occupying their homeland. French kings found alternative ways to finance the war – sales taxes, debasing the coinage – and were less dependent than the English on tax levies passed by national legislatures. English anti-war critics thus had more to work with than the French.

A 2021 theory about the early formation of state capacity is that interstate war was responsible for initiating a strong move toward states implementing tax systems with higher state capabilities. For example, see France in the Hundred Years' War, when the English occupation threatened the independent French Kingdom. The king and his ruling elite demanded consistent and permanent taxation, which would allow a standing army to be financed. The French nobility, which had always opposed such an extension of state capacity, agreed in this exceptional situation. The inter-state war with England increased French state capability.

Bubonic plague and warfare reduced population numbers throughout Europe during this period. France lost half its population during the Hundred Years' War, with Normandy reduced by three-quarters and Paris by two-thirds. During the same period, England's population fell by 20 to 33 percent.

=== Military significance ===
French success in the Caroline war had been largely driven by a professional standing army that Charles V had been able to create and finance in the aftermath of the disastrous experience with the mercenary routiers who had pillaged much of the country after the 1360 peace. This force, the first standing army in post-Roman western Europe, had been disbanded in the tumultuous regency period after 1380. Charles VII reestablished a permanent standing army in 1445 with the Compagnies d'ordonnance which would survive until eventually replaced by the gendarmerie system in the 17th century. The professional units gave the French a considerable strategic advantage as well as an edge in professionalism and discipline, being composed of paid full-time soldiers, at a time when levies could only be fielded for limited periods of time and the allegiances of the aristocratic knights could often shift to the opposing side. The standing armies of both Charles V and Charles VII had approximately 6,000 men, divided to many companies of cavalrymen.

The Hundred Years' War was a time of rapid military evolution. Weapons, tactics, army structure and the social meaning of war all changed, partly in response to the war's costs, partly through advancement in technology and partly through lessons that warfare taught. The feudal system slowly disintegrated as well as the concept of chivalry.

By the war's end, although the heavy cavalry was still considered the most powerful unit in an army, the heavily armoured horse had to deal with several tactics developed to deny or mitigate its effective use on a battlefield. The English began using lightly armoured mounted troops, known as hobelars whose tactics had been developed against the Scots, in the Anglo-Scottish wars of the 14th century. Hobelars rode smaller unarmoured horses, enabling them to move through difficult or boggy terrain where heavier cavalry would struggle. Rather than fight while seated on the horse, they would dismount to engage the enemy. The closing battle of the war, the Battle of Castillon, was the first major battle won through the extensive use of field artillery.

== Prominent figures ==
=== France ===
Arms	Historical Figure	Life	Role(s)
	King Philip VI	1293–1350; Reigned 1328–1350	Charles of Valois's son
	King John II	1319–1364; Reigned 1350–1364	Philip VI's son
	King Charles V	1338–1380; Reigned 1364–1380	John II's son
	Bertrand du Guesclin	1320–1380	Commander
	Louis I Duke of Anjou	1339–1384; Regent 1380–1382	John II's son
	King Charles VI	1368–1422; Reigned 1380–1422	Charles V's son
	King Charles VII	1403–1461; Reigned 1422–1461	Charles VI's son
	Joan of Arc	1412–1431	Religious visionary
	La Hire	1390–1443	Commander
	Jean Poton de Xaintrailles	1390–1461	Commander
	John II; Duke of Alençon	1409–1476	Commander
	Jean de Dunois	1402–1468	Commander
	Jean Bureau	1390–1463	Master gunner
	Gilles de Rais	1405–1440	Commander

=== England ===
Arms	Historical Figure	Life	Role(s)
	Isabella of France	1295–1358; Regent of England 1327–1330	Queen consort of England, wife of Edward II, mother of Edward III, regent of England, sister of Charles IV and daughter of Philip IV of France
	King Edward III	1312–1377; Reigned 1327–1377	Philip IV's grandson
	Henry of Grosmont; Duke of Lancaster	1310–1361	Commander
	Edward the Black Prince	1330–1376	Edward III's son and Prince of Wales
	John of Gaunt; Duke of Lancaster	1340–1399	Edward III's son
	King Richard II	1367–1400; Reigned 1377–1399	Son of the Black Prince, Edward III's grandson
	King Henry IV	1367–1413; Reigned 1399–1413	John of Gaunt's son, Edward III's grandson
	King Henry V	1387–1422; Reigned 1413–1422	Henry IV's son
	Catherine of Valois	1401–1437	Queen consort of England, daughter of Charles VI of France, mother of Henry VI of England and by her second marriage grandmother of Henry VII
	John of Lancaster; Duke of Bedford	1389–1435; Regent 1422–1435	Henry IV's son
	Sir John Fastolf	1380–1459	Commander
	John Talbot; Earl of Shrewsbury	1387–1453	Commander
	King Henry VI	1421–1471; Reigned 1422–1461 (also 1422–1453 as King Henry II of France)	Henry V's son, grandson of Charles VI of France
	Richard Plantagenet; Duke of York	1411–1460	Commander

=== Burgundy ===
Arms	Historical Figure	Life	Role(s)
	Philip the Bold; Duke of Burgundy	1342–1404; Duke 1363–1404	Son of John II of France
	John the Fearless; Duke of Burgundy	1371–1419; Duke 1404–1419	Son of Philip the Bold
	Philip the Good; Duke of Burgundy	1396–1467; Duke 1419–1467	Son of John the Fearless

== See also ==
- France–United Kingdom relations
- Influence of French on English
- Journal d'un bourgeois de Paris – Medieval journal by a Parisian cleric
- List of battles involving the Kingdom of France
- List of Hundred Years' War battles
- Medieval demography – Human demography in Europe and the Mediterranean during the Middle Ages
- Military history of France
- Military history of the United Kingdom
- Timeline of the Hundred Years' War

== Sources ==
- Allmand, Christopher (23 September 2010). "Henry V (1386–1422)". Oxford Dictionary of National Biography (online ed.). Oxford University Press. doi:10.1093/ref:odnb/12952. (Subscription, Wikipedia Library access or UK public library membership required.)
- Backman, Clifford R. (2003). The Worlds of Medieval Europe. New York: Oxford University Press. ISBN 978-0-1953-3527-9.
- Baker, Denise Nowakowski, ed. (2000). Inscribing the Hundred Years' War in French and English Cultures. SUNY Press. ISBN 978-0-7914-4701-7.
- Barber, Richard (2004). "Edward, prince of Wales and of Aquitaine (1330–1376)". Oxford Dictionary of National Biography (online ed.). Oxford University Press. doi:10.1093/ref:odnb/8523. (Subscription, Wikipedia Library access or UK public library membership required.)
- Bartlett, Robert (2000). Roberts, J.M. (ed.). England under the Norman and Angevin Kings 1075–1225. New Oxford History of England. London: Oxford University Press. ISBN 978-0-1982-2741-0.
- Bean, J.M.W. (2008). "Percy, Henry, first earl of Northumberland (1341–1408)". Oxford Dictionary of National Biography (online ed.). Oxford University Press. doi:10.1093/ref:odnb/21932. (Subscription, Wikipedia Library access or UK public library membership required.)
- Brissaud, Jean (1915). History of French Public Law. The Continental Legal History. Vol. 9. Translated by Garner, James W. Boston: Little, Brown and Company.
- Chisholm, Hugh, ed. (1911). "Brétigny" . Encyclopædia Britannica. Vol. 4 (11th ed.). Cambridge University Press. p. 501.
- Curry, Anne (2002). The Hundred Years' War 1337–1453 (PDF). Essential Histories. Vol. 19. Oxford: Osprey Publishing. ISBN 978-1-8417-6269-2. Archived from the original (PDF) on 27 September 2018.
- Darby, H.C. (1976) [1973]. A New Historical Geography of England before 1600. Cambridge University Press. ISBN 978-0-5212-9144-6.
- Davis, P. (2003). Besieged: 100 Great Sieges from Jericho to Sarajevo (2nd ed.). Santa Barbara, CA: Oxford University Press. ISBN 978-0-1952-1930-2.
- Friar, Stephen (2004). The Sutton Companion to Local History (revised ed.). Sparkford: Sutton. ISBN 978-0-7509-2723-9.
- Gormley, Larry (2007). "The Hundred Years War: Overview". eHistory. Ohio State University.
- Griffiths, Ralph A. (28 May 2015). "Henry VI (1421–1471)". Oxford Dictionary of National Biography (online ed.). Oxford University Press. doi:10.1093/ref:odnb/12953. (Subscription, Wikipedia Library access or UK public library membership required.)
- Grummitt, David (2008). The Calais Garrison: War and Military Service in England, 1436–1558. Woodbridge, Suffolk: Boydell Press. ISBN 978-1-8438-3398-7.
- Guignebert, Charles (1930). A Short History of the French People. Vol. 1. Translated by F. G. Richmond. New York: Macmillan Company – via Questia.
- Harris, Robin (1994). Valois Guyenne. Studies in History Series. Vol. 71. Royal Historical Society. ISBN 978-0-8619-3226-9. ISSN 0269-2244.
- Harriss, G.L. (September 2010). "Thomas, duke of Clarence (1387–1421)". Oxford Dictionary of National Biography (online ed.). Oxford University Press. doi:10.1093/ref:odnb/27198. (Subscription, Wikipedia Library access or UK public library membership required.)
- Hattendorf, J. & Unger, R., eds. (2003). War at Sea in the Middle Ages and Renaissance. Woodbridge, Suffolk: Boydell Press. ISBN 978-0-8511-5903-4.
- Hewitt, H.J. (2004). The Black Prince's Expedition. Barnsley, S. Yorkshire: Pen and Sword Military. ISBN 978-1-8441-5217-9.
- Holmes, Urban T. Jr. & Schutz, Alexander Herman [in German] (1948). A History of the French Language (revised ed.). Columbus, OH: Harold L. Hedrick – via Questia.
- Hunt, William (1903). "Edward the Black Prince". In Lee, Sidney (ed.). Index and Epitome. Dictionary of National Biography. Cambridge University Press. p. 388.
- Janvrin, Isabelle; Rawlinson, Catherine (2016). The French in London: From William the Conqueror to Charles de Gaulle. Translated by Read, Emily. Wilmington Square Books. ISBN 978-1-9085-2465-2.
- Jaques, Tony (2007). "Paris, 1429, Hundred Years War". Dictionary of Battles and Sieges: P-Z. Greenwood Publishing Group. p. 777. ISBN 978-0-3133-3539-6.
- Jones, Robert (2008). "Re-thinking the origins of the 'Irish' Hobelar" (PDF). Cardiff Historical Papers. Cardiff School of History and Archaeology.
- Ladurie, E. (1987). The French Peasantry 1450–1660. Translated by Sheridan, Alan. University of California Press. p. 32. ISBN 978-0-5200-5523-0.
- Le Patourel, J. (1984). Jones, Michael (ed.). Feudal Empires: Norman and Plantagenet. London: Hambledon Continuum. ISBN 978-0-9076-2822-4. Archived from the original on 16 January 2023.
- Lee, C. (1998). This Sceptred Isle 55 BC–1901. London: Penguin Books. ISBN 978-0-1402-6133-2.
- Lowe, Ben (1997). Imagining Peace: History of Early English Pacifist Ideas. University Park, PA: Penn State University Press. ISBN 978-0-2710-1689-4.
- Mortimer, Ian (2008). The Fears of Henry IV: The Life of England's Self-Made King. London: Jonathan Cape. ISBN 978-1-8441-3529-5.
- Neillands, Robin (2001). The Hundred Years War (revised ed.). London: Routledge. ISBN 978-0-4152-6131-9.
- Nicolle, D. (2012). The Fall of English France 1449–53 (PDF). Campaign. Vol. 241. Illustrated by Graham Turner. Colchester: Osprey Publishing. ISBN 978-1-8490-8616-5. Archived (PDF) from the original on 8 August 2013.
- Ormrod, W. Mark (2001). Edward III. Yale English Monarchs series. London: Yale University Press. ISBN 978-0-3001-1910-7.
- —— (3 January 2008). "Edward III (1312–1377)". Oxford Dictionary of National Biography (online) (online ed.). Oxford University Press. doi:10.1093/ref:odnb/8519. (Subscription, Wikipedia Library access or UK public library membership required.)
- Powicke, Michael (2009) [1962]. Military Obligation in Medieval England. Oxford: Clarendon Press. ISBN 978-0-1982-0695-8.
- Preston, Richard; Wise, Sydney F.; Werner, Herman O. (1991). Men in arms: a history of warfare and its interrelationships with Western society (5th ed.). Beverley, MA: Wadsworth Publishing Co., Inc. ISBN 978-0-0303-3428-3.
- Prestwich, Michael C. (1988). Edward I. Yale English Monarchs series. University of California Press. ISBN 978-0-5200-6266-5.
- —— (2003). The Three Edwards: War and State in England, 1272–1377 (2nd ed.). London: Routledge. ISBN 978-0-4153-0309-5.
- —— (2007). Plantagenet England 1225–1360. Oxford University Press. ISBN 978-0-1992-2687-0.
- Previté-Orton, C. (1978). The shorter Cambridge Medieval History. Vol. 2. Cambridge University Press. ISBN 978-0-5212-0963-2.
- Rogers, Clifford J., ed. (2010). The Oxford Encyclopedia of Medieval Warfare and Military Technology. Vol. 1. Oxford University Press. ISBN 978-0-1953-3403-6.
- Sizer, Michael (2007). "The Calamity of Violence: Reading the Paris Massacres of 1418". Proceedings of the Western Society for French History. 35. hdl:2027/spo.0642292.0035.002. ISSN 2573-5012.
- Smith, Llinos (2008). "Glyn Dŵr, Owain (c.1359–c.1416)". Oxford Dictionary of National Biography (online ed.). Oxford University Press. doi:10.1093/ref:odnb/10816. (Subscription, Wikipedia Library access or UK public library membership required.)
- Sumption, Jonathan (1991). The Hundred Years War. Vol. 1: Trial by Battle. Philadelphia: University of Pennsylvania Press. ISBN 0-8122-3147-3. OL 1546523M.
- —— (2012). The Hundred Years War. Vol. 3: Divided Houses. London: Faber & Faber. ISBN 978-0-5712-4012-8.
- Tuck, Richard (2004). "Richard II (1367–1400)". Oxford Dictionary of National Biography (online ed.). Oxford University Press. doi:10.1093/ref:odnb/23499. (Subscription, Wikipedia Library access or UK public library membership required.)
- Turchin, P. (2003). Historical Dynamics: Why States Rise and Fall. Princeton University Press. ISBN 978-0-6911-1669-3.
- Vauchéz, Andre, ed. (2000). Encyclopedia of the Middle ages. Volume 1. Cambridge: James Clark. ISBN 978-1-5795-8282-1.
- Venette, J. (1953). Newall, Richard A. (ed.). The Chronicle of Jean de Venette. Translated by Birdsall, Jean. Columbia University Press.
- Wagner, J. (2006). Encyclopedia of the Hundred Years War (PDF). Westport, CT: Greenwood Press. ISBN 978-0-3133-2736-0. Archived from the original (PDF) on 16 July 2018.
- Webster, Bruce (1998). The Wars of the Roses. London: UCL Press. ISBN 978-1-8572-8493-5.
- Wilson, Derek (2011). The Plantagenets: The Kings That Made Britain. London: Quercus. ISBN 978-0-8573-8004-3.
