= Master of the Cité des dames =

French manuscript illuminator

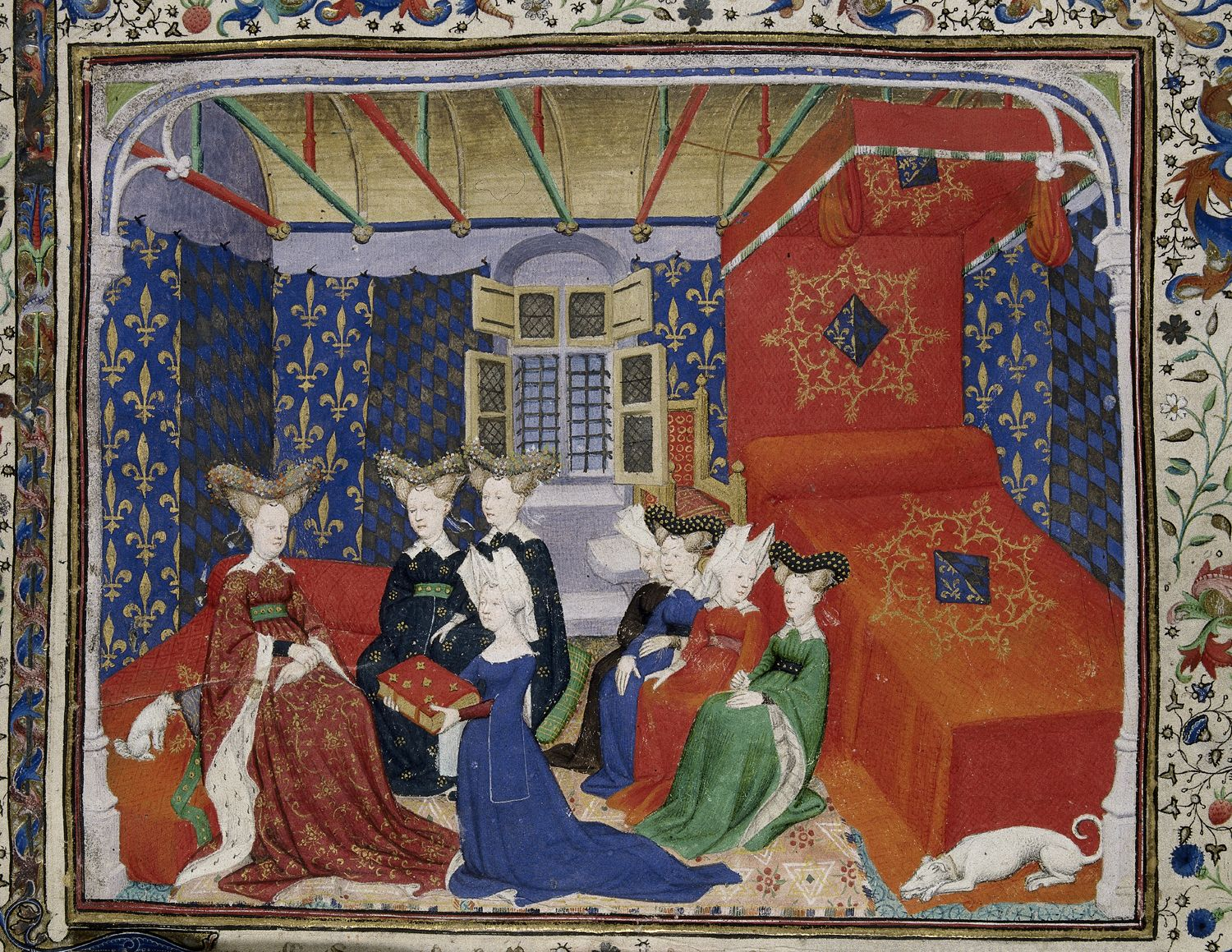
Presentation miniature by the Master of the Cité des dames, showing Christine de Pizan presenting her collected works to Queen Isabeau of Bavaria.

The Master of the Cité des dames or the Cité des dames Master is the notname assigned to a workshop producing illuminated manuscripts in Paris during the first two decades of the 15th century. The workshop was one of the most productive in Paris at the time.

The notname is derived from the fact that the workshop was hired by Christine de Pizan to produce illuminations for copies of her book The Book of the City of Ladies (in French, Le Livre de la Cité des dames), which became a model for other illuminators illustrating her books. The workshop was stylistically influenced by Jacquemart de Hesdin and Italian Trecento painting.

== History ==
The workshop was one of the largest and most productive of early 15th-century Paris, which at the time was a centre of production of illuminated manuscripts. The workshop specialised in secular texts; Millard Meiss identified only two books of hours to which the workshop contributed miniatures. One of these, currently in the Library of Catalonia in Barcelona and dated to 1401, is also one of the earliest works containing illuminations by the workshop (though most of the illuminations in the book were made by the Master of Luçon).

Sometime around 1405, the workshop was engaged by Christine de Pizan to produce illuminated copies of her book The Book of the City of Ladies, in French Le Livre de la Cité des dames. The workshop derives its notname from this book, as the volumes illustrated by the workshop became iconographic models for future copies of the same book by other illustrators. The workshop made four copies, two of which were given as gifts to Christine de Pizan's benefactors the dukes John of Berry and Philip of Burgundy. A fifth copy of the text illuminated by the workshop formed part of a collection of works by Christine de Pizan, the largest extant, and presented to the Queen Isabeau of Bavaria around 1410.

The workshop appears to have been loosely constituted and formed collaborations with several other Parisian illuminators of the time, including Jacquemart de Hesdin, the Bedford Master, the Boucicaut Master, the Master of the Epître d'Othéa, and the Clères Femmes Master.

== Style ==
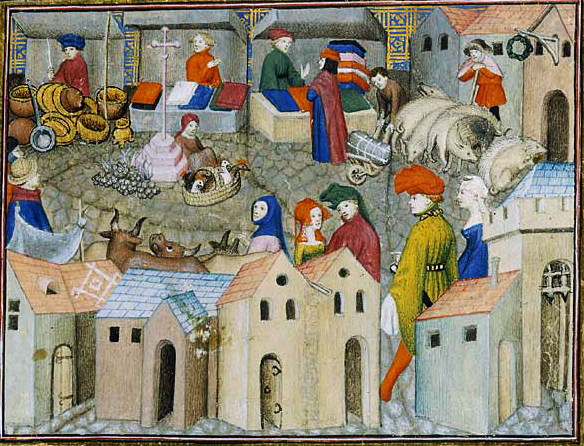
A depiction of a market scene by the Master of the Cité des dames from a manuscript in the French national library. The workshop depicted urban scenes with an advanced spatial conception.

Christopher de Hamel considers the Master of the Cité des dames among the finest Parisian illuminators during the first decades of the 15th century. Millard Meiss noted the influence from Italian Trecento painting on the style of the workshop, as well as a close and direct influence from Jacquemart de Hesdin. Meiss also stated that the workshop on occasion displayed "a very advanced spatial conception that appeared only a decade later in Italy", notably in depictions of urban scenes, and that its treatment of landscapes – "extensive and flat" – came to directly influence the Boucicaut Master.
