= Mathilde Laigle =

French historian

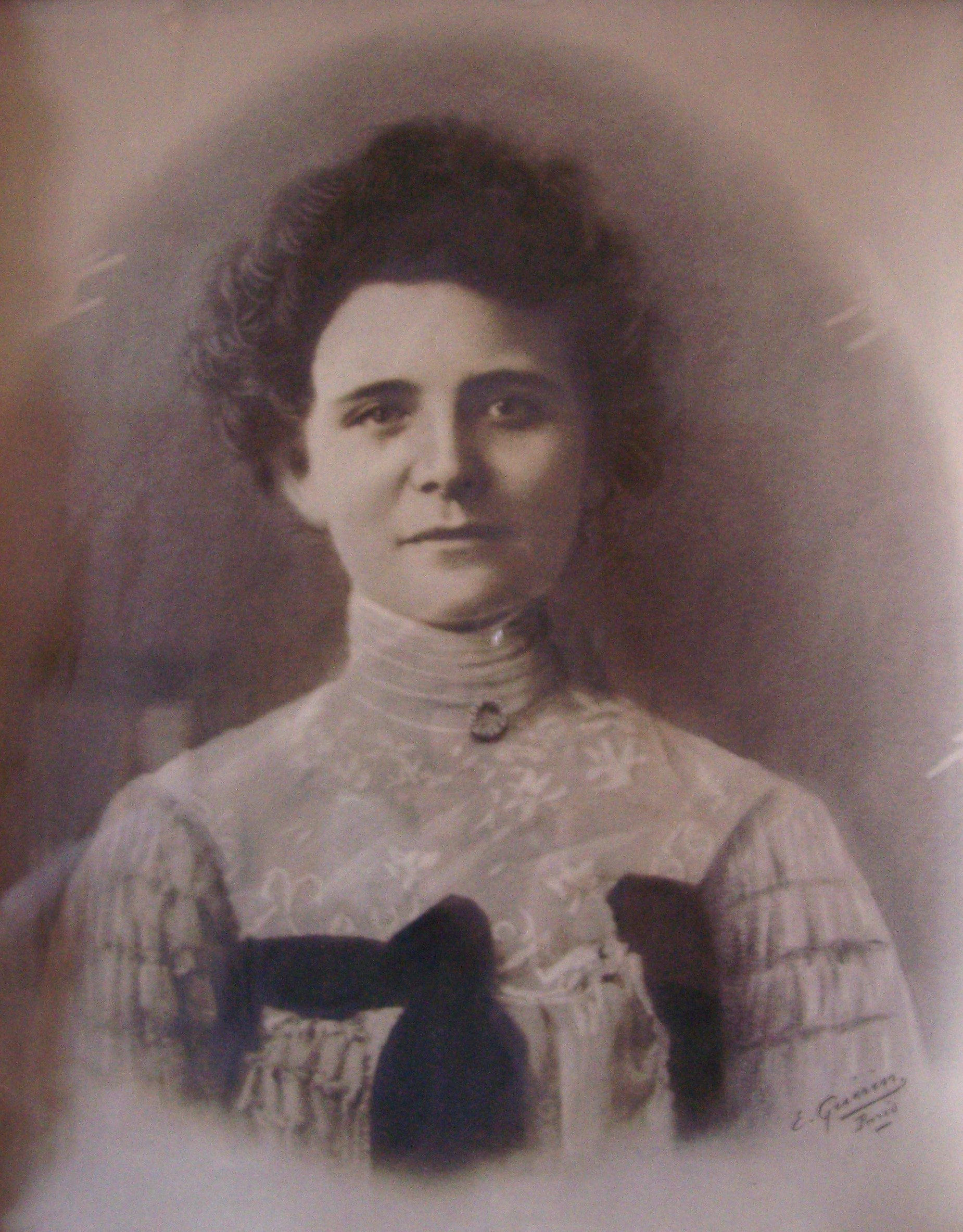
- Born: 24 March 1865; Vandoncourt
- Died: 1 May 1949 (aged 84); Beaumont-de-Pertuis
- Education: USA
- Occupations: Writer, Governess
- Known for: Doctor of Philosophy who studied Christine de Pizan

Mathilde Laigle (1865–1949) was a French historian. She was an early student in America becoming a governess to the children of the governor of Iowa. She was an expert on Christine de Pizan and is credited with helping to revive interest in the early feminist.

== Life ==
Laigle was born in Vandoncourt in 1865. From 1895 to 1903 she was a governess to the four daughters of William and Anne Matilda Larrabee. William was the Governor of Iowa. She was their companion and teacher and she would spend whole days when the only language to be spoken was French.

Laigle made three transatlantic voyages between 1904, 1908 and 1918, although early trips may be unrecorded.

Laigle wrote about Christine de Pizan and is credited with reviving the work of the early feminist. She concluded that de Pizan's The Book of the City of Ladies had been completed in or after 1404. A writer who had been ignored in her own country but noted elsewhere. Laigle noticed that de Pizan's work had not been translated into Spanish but other writers had borrowed extensively from her work. When her work about Christine de Pisan was presented in Strasbourg in 1912 a heckler shouted "She should have stayed home with the kids". One other writer, Morewedge, has called Laigle's work superficial whilst noting that it was the only source on one book.

She went to teach at Wellesley College. In 1906 she and her sister, Eva Louise Marguerite Mottet, had a house built where they lived until 1919.

Laigle died in Beaumont-de-Pertuis in 1949.

== Works ==
- Le Livre Des Trois Vertus de Christine de Pisan Et Son Milieu Historique Et Littéraire
