= The Tale of Joan of Arc =

15th century French patriotic lyrical verse

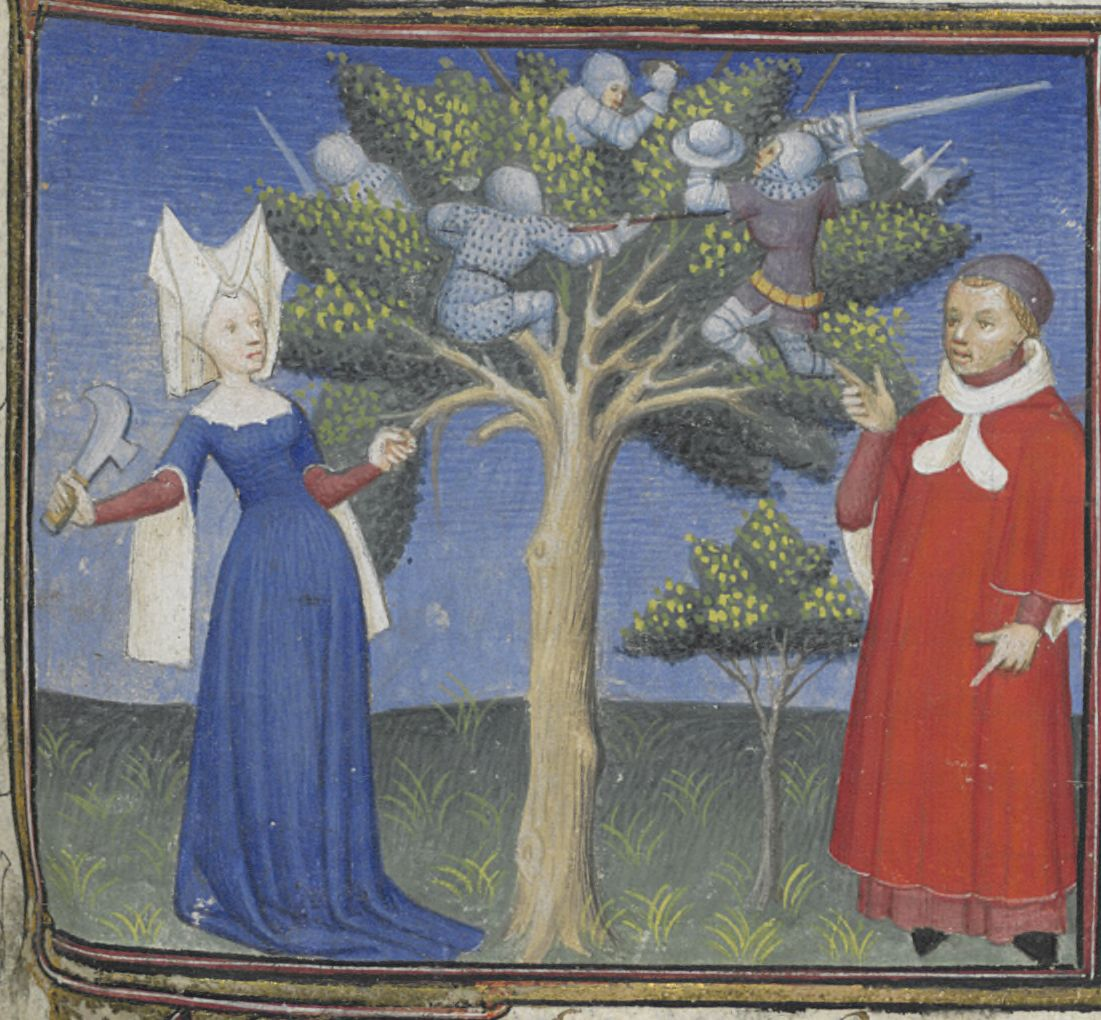
From The Book of Deeds of Arms and of Chivalry by Christine de Pizan

Le Ditié de Jehanne d'Arc ("The Tale of Joan of Arc", sometimes called "The Song of Joan of Arc") is a patriotic lyrical verse, and the last work of the medieval French poet Christine de Pizan, who lived from 1364 to about 1430 AD. Earlier in her career Pizan wrote many texts including The Book of the City of Ladies which included tales about famous women in history. Christine de Pizan was a professional poet in the court of King Charles VI of France. In her last work "The Tale of Joan of Arc" Pizan writes 61 verses about Joan of Arc, who led the French army to reclaim territory being held by the English. It was written before Joan lost in battle and was taken as a prisoner and right before the death of Christine de Pizan herself.

== Stanzas ==
The poem is composed of 61 stanzas that begins with the introduction of Christine. It has been translated into English by Renate Blumenfeld-Kosinski. The prologue is composed of 12 stanzas, followed by 46 stanzas which comprise the main story, and ending with stanzas 60 and 61, which serve as a conclusion. The entire story is a lyric delivered in first person voice.

Christine, who have wept for eleven years in a walled abbey where I have lived ever since Charles (how strange this is!) the King's son - dare I say it? - fled in haste from Paris, I who have lived enclosed there on account of the treachery, now, for the very first time, begin to laugh;

Stanza 10:

Who, then, has seen something so extraordinary occur - which should be noted and remembered in all regions -...

The lyrical verse closes with Christine's prayer and stating when it was completed.

Stanza 60:

I pray to God that He will put it in your hearts to act this way, so the cruel tempest of these wars will be obliterated, and that you can spend your lives in peace, under your supreme ruler, and that you may never offend him, and that he may be a good lord to you. Amen.

Stanza 61:

This poem was finished by Christine in the above-mentioned year 1429, on the day that ends July. But I understand that some people will not be satisfied with its contents, for if one's head is lowered and one's eyes are heavy one cannot look at the light. Followed by, Perhaps the last written words by Pizan: Here ends a most beautiful poem written by Christine.

== Development and history ==
The lyrical verse written by Christine de Pizan, "The Tale of Joan of Arc", was completed on July 31, 1429. The story is credited as the only written work about Joan of Arc that was written during her lifetime. Pizan is said to have died before Joan was captured. Joan of Arc led the French army in May 1429 to end a siege in Orleans and was victorious because within a day the English were forced to retreat. The poetic story written by Christine de Pizan emphasizes victory. However, Joan's battle to reclaim Paris in September 1429 was unsuccessful. Joan of Arc was captured in 1430 and burned at the stake on May 30, 1431 after a series of trials by the English, through the church, about her attire and because she said that God spoke to her and that she listened. Pizan spent the last of her days at the monastery of Poissy and this is where she wrote "The Tale of Joan of Arc".

== Summary ==
During the prologue, Christine proclaims that the sun began to shine in 1429. After years in an abbey where she felt as though she lived locked in a cage, hope was beginning to shine its light for her and for all, and that all the people could thank God for this new season of happiness that was now upon them. She speaks of the exiled King of France and the troubles that all of the people had suffered due to this. Then she declares it is time to celebrate and welcome back the king. In stanza 10, Christine begins to explain how this change of fortune had occurred. In stanza 11, Christine states that a tender virgin has come to help them, a gift from God. The story begins in stanza 13 because here she begins to introduce the "Maid" who by God's grace has proclaimed victories over their enemies at long last. Christine speaks of a prophecy. She then explains how Joan has shown that she has helped to reward all the people with noble gifts from God and the Holy Spirit and she questions how we can we ever repay Joan.

Christine devotes stanzas to powerful women from the apocrypha bible books and legends of the past and then states that Joan has surpassed even them. Christine sees the victories as a glory of the female sex and something that ten thousand men could not have done! The following stanzas are dedicated to honoring Joan as a warrior and her battles, stating that all of Christendom stands behind her. Christine says that Joan was a gift from God to those on earth, because she showed a courage that no man would. The story begins to come to a conclusion when Christine states that the people should celebrate Charles, their rightful king, for he is who Joan fought for. The last stanzas are a prayer that all of the people will turn to God and live in peace. In her final lines, Christine states "But I understand that some people may not be satisfied with its contents" which has led to speculation that perhaps Christine could not freely write all that she wished to impart to her readers in the poem. She states, "for if one's head is lowered and one's eyes are heavy one cannot look at the light." Then finally: "Here ends a most beautiful poem written by Christine."

== Criticism ==
Kevin Brownlee, who has written translations of Christine de Pizan's work alongside Renate Blumenfeld-Kosinski, wrote a book titled Discourses of Authority in Medieval and Renaissance Literature which contains a chapter of analysis for "the modern reader to understand that the Ditie was a celebration" by examining the question of authority, both literary and historical, that Pizan employs in the work.

Beatrice Gottlieb described Christine as a forerunner of feminism in "The Problem of Feminism in the Fifteenth Century," which also states that "Christine could not, of course,...... be called a feminist before the word existed."
