= The Treasure of the City of Ladies =

Manual of education by medieval Italian-French author Christine de Pizan

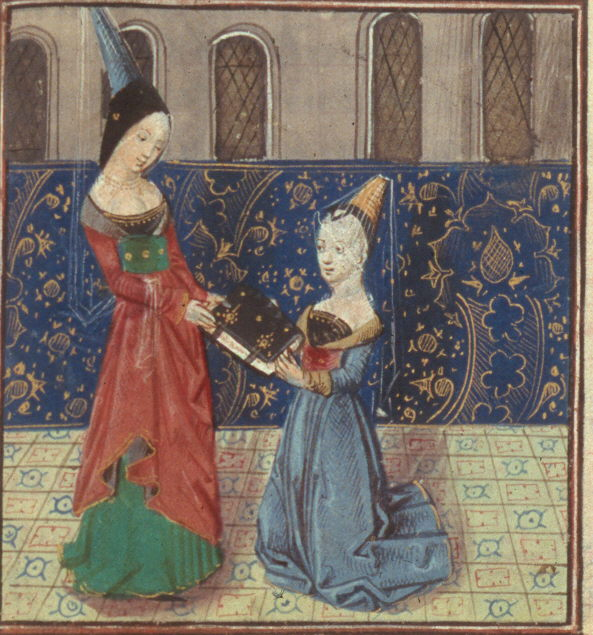
Christine de Pizan presenting The Treasure to Margaret of Burgundy

The Treasure of the City of Ladies (Le trésor de la cité des dames, also known The Book of the Three Virtues) is a manual of education by medieval Italian-French author Christine de Pisan. Finished, like her previous The Book of the City of Ladies, by the year 1405, and dedicated to Margaret of Burgundy at a time when Christine was writing works for Margaret's father Duke John the Fearless of Burgundy, the book aims to educate women of all estates with advice on various topics. Her Book and Treasure are two of her best-known works, mainly due to the study of these books in modern academia.

== Genesis and description ==
After I built the City of Ladies with the help and by the commandment of the three ladies of Virtue, Reason, Rectitude and Justice, in the manner explained in the text of that book, and after I, more than anyone else, had worked so hard to finish the project and felt so exhausted by the long and continued exertion, I wanted only to rest and be idle for a while.

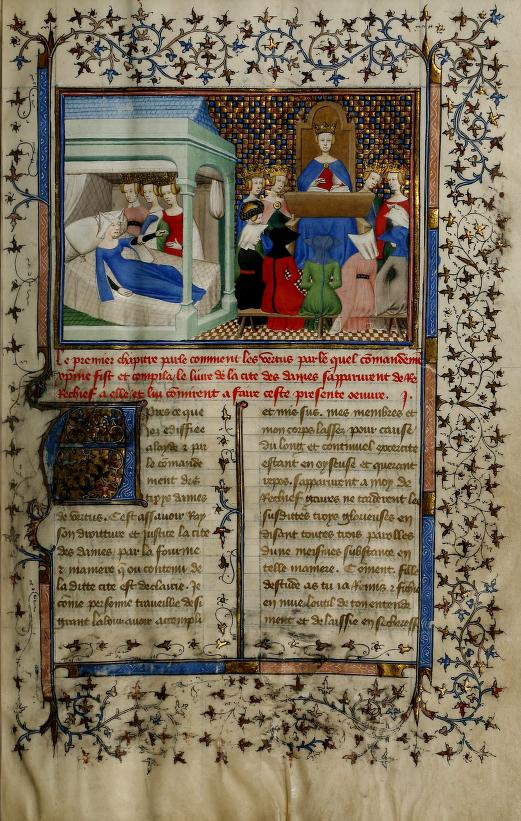
Author is kept from rest by the Three Virtues. Boston Public Library, Special Collections, MS f. Med. 101.

In the Book of the City of Ladies Christine had given a passionate and well-organized defense of women by arguing (in many different ways and methods) for the value and worth of women, refuting the view of authors such as Jean de Meun and citing famous examples of notable and virtuous women. In the subsequent Treasure she claimed that after finishing the Book all she wanted to do was rest; however, harassed and accused of indolence by the three ladies of Virtue (Reason, Rectitude, and Justice) who had helped her with the Book, she agreed to continue with a sequel. The earliest surviving miniature for the book, supervised by Christine de Pizan and made by the same master who illustrated the Book, shows Christine attempting to rest, in bed, but with the Three Virtues standing to her left and pulling her out of bed by the arm. In the Treasure, she offered the lessons imparted from those feminine avatars to women of all estates, including such categories as nuns, prostitutes, married and unmarried women.

== Titles and editions ==
The early manuscripts, dedicated to Margaret of Burgundy, Dauphine of France, refer to the book as The Book of the Three Virtues. Printed, post-1497 texts, published under the patronage of Anne of Brittany, had an altered title which made explicit reference to The City of Ladies. Many surviving manuscripts are connected to Margaret of Burgundy and her sisters (all of whom were used for political marriages by their father, John the Fearless) and thus the text easily became widely disseminated.

The Treasure survives in a few 15th-century manuscripts and three printed editions from the 15th and 16th centuries; the last of these dates from 1536 and was printed by Jehan André and Denis Janot. Christine de Pizan, who wrote for a living, was very interested in producing sumptuously illustrated manuscripts, and therefore eight of the twenty-one surviving 15th-century manuscripts are illustrated. She preferred what Laura Rinaldi Dufresne calls a "simple, straightforward Italianate style rather than the fussy embellished versions preferred in French workshops". De Pizan supervised the first miniature illustrations, which were made by "The City of Ladies Master", a name bestowed by Millard Meiss.
