= Anastasia (artist) =

French artist (fl. c. 1400)

Anastasia (flourished c. 1400 in Paris) was a French illuminator of manuscripts, apparently specializing in the elaborate decorative borders that were increasingly fashionable, and landscape backgrounds. In her day most manuscripts were produced in commercial workshops, and many artists were women, probably especially those specializing in borders, which were often produced by a different artist from the main miniature image. The School of Paris was still the leading centre of illumination in this period, and Parisian works were widely distributed across Europe.

Nothing is known about her except for the praise heaped upon her by the medieval writer Christine de Pisan in her work, The Book of the City of Ladies (1405). Pisan describes her as the finest illuminator of her day in her field:

I know a woman today, named Anastasia, who is so learned and skilled in painting manuscript borders and miniature backgrounds (vignetures d'enlumineure en livres and the champaignes d'ystories) that one cannot find an artisan in all the city of Paris – where the best in the world are found – who can surpass her, nor who can paint flowers and details as delicately as she does, nor whose work is more highly esteemed, no matter how rich or precious the book is. People cannot stop talking about her. And I know this from experience, for she has executed several things for me, which stand out among the ornamental borders of the great masters. (City of Ladies 85)
