= Dream vision =

Literary device

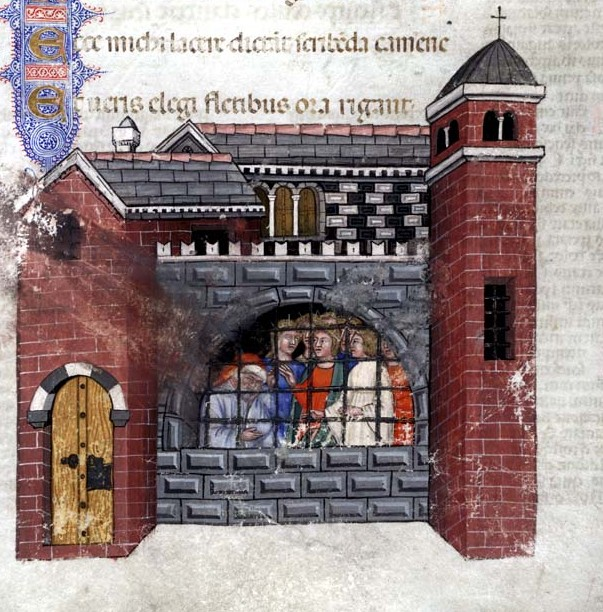
Boethius in prison

A dream vision or visio is a literary device in which a dream or vision is recounted as having revealed knowledge or a truth that is not available to the dreamer or visionary in a normal waking state. While dreams occur frequently throughout the history of literature, visionary literature as a genre began to flourish suddenly, and is especially characteristic of early medieval Europe. In both its ancient and medieval form, the dream vision is often felt to be of divine origin. The genre reemerged in the era of Romanticism, when dreams were regarded as creative gateways to imaginative possibilities beyond rational calculation.

This genre typically follows a structure whereby a narrator recounts their experience of falling asleep, dreaming, and waking, with the story often an allegory. The dream, which forms the subject of the poem, is prompted by events in their waking life that are referred to early in the poem. The ‘vision’ addresses these waking concerns through the possibilities of the imaginative landscapes offered by the dream-state. In the course of the dream, the narrator, often with the aid of a guide, is offered perspectives that provide potential resolutions to their waking concerns. The poem concludes with the narrator waking, determined to record the dream – thus producing the poem. The dream-vision convention was widely used in European, Old Russian, medieval Latin, Muslim, Gnostic, Hebrew, and other literatures.

== Visions in medieval European literature ==
In the book "Medieval Latin visions", Russian philologist Boris Yarkho explores the genre of dream visions, defining it in terms of form and content. To the formal aspects of the genre, the researcher refers, first, the didacticism of the genre of visions itself, which should reveal some truths to the reader; secondly, the presence of the image of a "clairvoyant" (or visionary), which has two functions: "he must perceive the content of the vision purely spiritually" and "must associate the content of the vision with sensory images". Third, the formal aspects include psychophysiological phenomena, that is, the situation and circumstances of the vision: lethargy, hallucinations and dreams.

The content of the genre of visions is based on the description of pictures of the afterlife, ghosts and phenomena of otherworldly forces, as well as eschatology. In addition, medieval visions can also be filled with topical content that is adjacent to the "eternal", that is, the afterlife, the otherworldly: socio-political contexts can penetrate into the visions, etc.

Yarkho pays attention to the internal structure of visions, distinguishing two types — "one-vertex" visions and "multi-vertex" (eschatological) visions. The structure of the second type of vision can be "archaic", "classical", or " complexly systematized».

On the Genesis of medieval visions, Rosalia Shor writes in the Literary encyclopedia (1929-1939):

Until the 12th century, all the visions were written in Latin, from the 12th century there are translated ones, and from the 13th — there are original visions in folk languages. The most complete form of visions is represented in the Latin poetry of the clergy: this genre is closely related to canonical and apocryphal religious literature and is close to Church preaching

The peak of the medieval vision genre is considered to be Dante's "Divine Comedy", which can be called a detailed vision, based on its narrative and compositional features.

== The deformation of the genre of visions ==
In the course of evolutionary development, the genre of visions in European literature undergoes natural historical changes: visions are beginning to be used by authors as a means of transmitting satirical content, for writing pamphlets on topical circumstances. As R. O. Shor notes,

since the Tenth century, the form and content of visions have provoked protest, often from the declassified layers of the clergy themselves (poor clerics and goliard schoolboys). All this results in periodic visions. On the other hand, the form of visions is taken over by courtly chivalrous poetry in folk languages: visions here acquire a new content, becoming a frame of love-didactic allegory — such as, for example, "Fabliau dou dieu d'amour" (the Story of the God of love), " Venus la déesse d'amors" (Venus — the goddess of love) and finally-the encyclopedia of courtly love-the famous "Roman de la Rose" of Guillaume de Lorris.

== Visions in Old Russian literature ==
The genre of visions was one of the typical genres of Old Russian literature, in addition, its individual elements could penetrate into the structure of other genres of Old Russian works. For example, Nikolai Prokofiev discovered the features of the genre of visions in stories, walks, lives, signs, and many other sources.

The composition of the traditional Old Russian vision is as follows: the plot begins with a prayer that precedes psychophysiological states, which are accompanied by visions. Then the hero sees otherworldly forces, which, showing the visionary a "revelation", solve some question. The fear of the clairvoyant is described, after which the meaning of the "revelation" itself is revealed. In conclusion, these same forces call on the visionary to preach what he has seen.

The nature of the images in the Old Russian visions is twofold: they can be both characters of Christian mythology, which do not need interpretation, and symbolic or allegorical images of living nature (going back to the Old Russian pagan beliefs). Exploring the genesis of visions, Nikolai Prokofiev raises them to the genre of dreams, very popular in ancient times.

The heroes of the Old Russian epic are often gods, and this phenomenon is usually given in dreams.

Some researchers conclude that the genre of visions gradually disappears from literature after the Peter the Great era. Russian writer Alexander Pigin, who in his book "Visions of the Other World in Russian Handwritten books" cites a whole body of texts that indicate that the genre of visions in the Russian handwritten tradition does not die in the XIX—XX centuries, and also draws attention to the lack of knowledge of the genre. Defining the subject of the Old Russian visions, he speaks of "small eschatology", that is, the doctrine of the posthumous fate of the human soul, and of "big eschatology" - the doctrine of the end of the world:

The subject of the visions is "small" (or "private") eschatology, since all the interest in them is focused on the posthumous fate of the individual.

Pigin points out that visions as a genre have their roots in archaic animistic beliefs, and ideas about the "other world" are found in all peoples.

== Authors and works ==
=== Latin ===
==== Ancient Roman ====
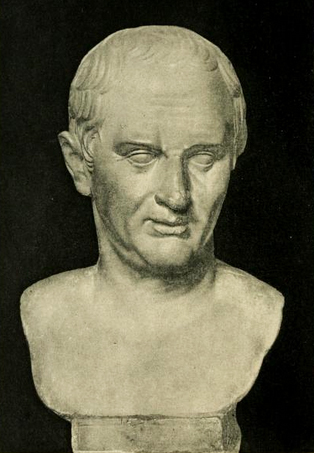
Cicero

- Augustine of Hippo, Soliloquia
- Boethius, De consolatione philosophiae
- Cicero, Dream of Scipio
- Macrobius, Commentary on Cicero's Dream of Scipio

==== Medieval Latin ====
- John Gower, Vox Clamantis Book One is an account of the Peasants' Revolt
- Alain de Lille, De planctu naturae
- Brother Marcus, Visio Tnugdali ("The Vision of Tundale")

=== French ===
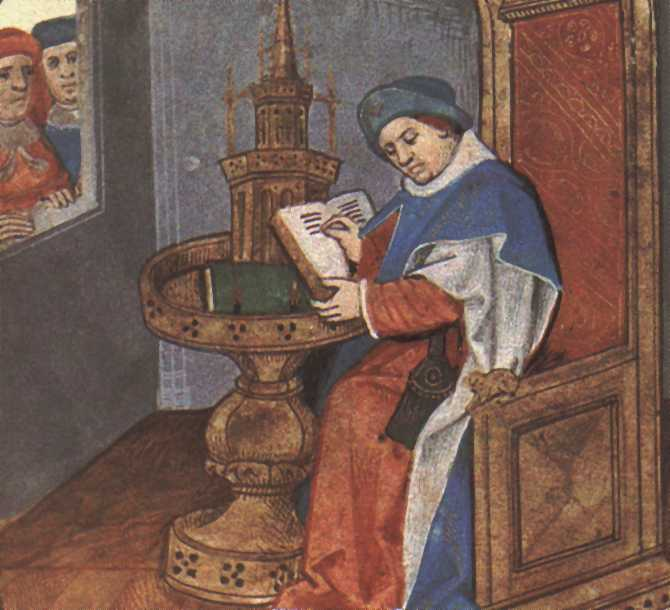
Guillaume de Lorris

- Guillaume de Lorris and Jean de Meun, Roman de la rose, also translated into Middle English by Geoffrey Chaucer
- Marie de France, The Legend of the Purgatory of St. Patrick
- Le Chemin de Povreté et de Richesse, a 14th-century dream poem incorporated in Le Ménagier de Paris
- Le Chemin de long estude, by Christine de Pizan

=== Irish ===
- See also aisling, Modern literature in Irish.
- Geoffrey Keating
- Aogán Ó Rathaille
- Eoghan Rua Ó Súilleabháin
- Seán "Clárach" Mac Domhnaill
- Brian Merriman
- Pádraig Phiarais Cúndún
- Seán Gaelach Ó Súilleabháin

=== Italian ===
- Dante Alighieri, The Divine Comedy depicts the conventions of dream-vision literature, though Dante specifically says that his vision is not a dream

=== Old English ===
- Bede, Vision of Drycthelm
- Anonymous, The Dream of the Rood – the guide in Dream of the Rood is the Cross on which Christ was crucified.

=== Middle English ===
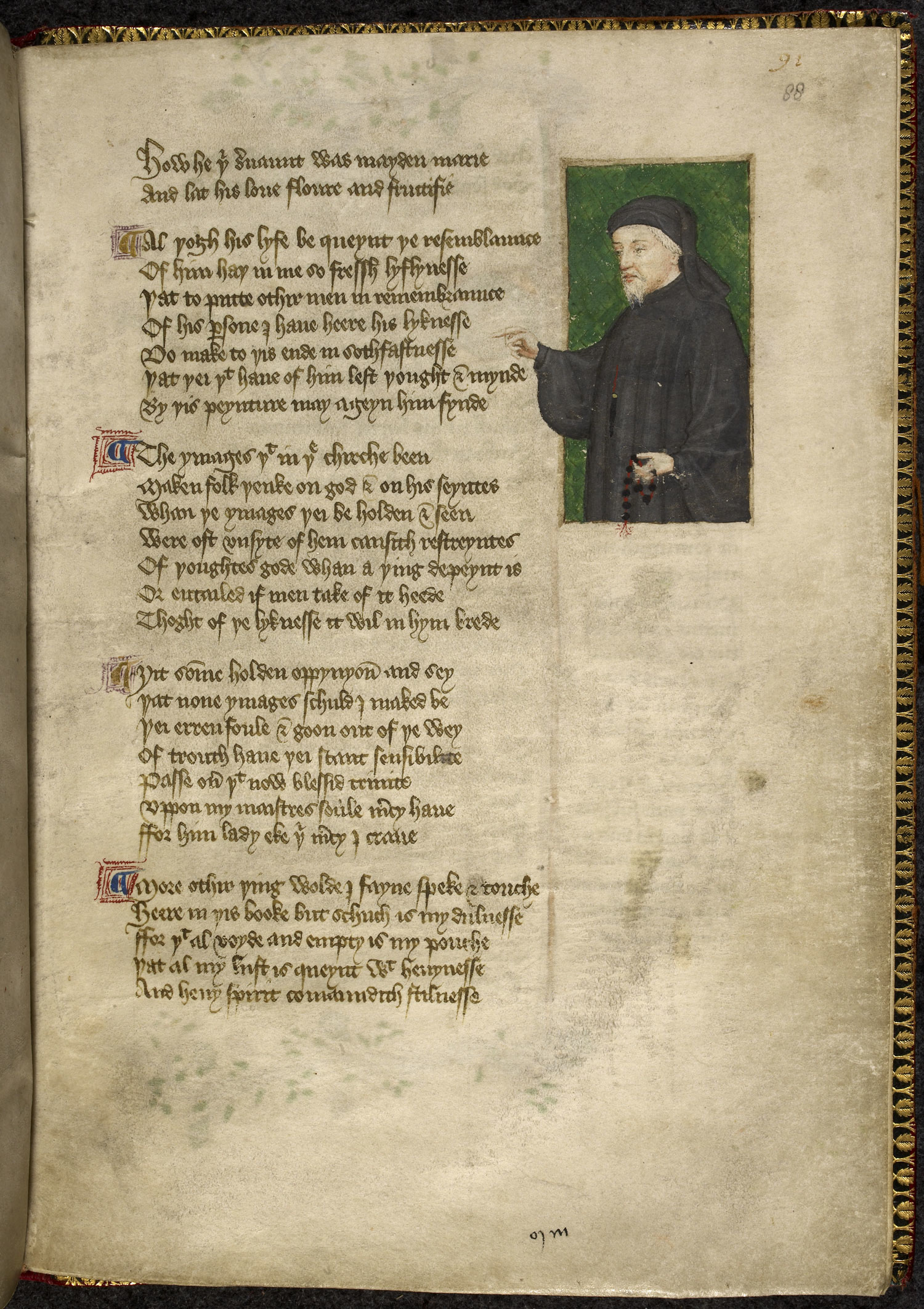
Geoffrey Chaucer

- Geoffrey Chaucer, Legend of Good Women, House of Fame, Book of the Duchess, Parliament of Fowls – The Parliament of Fowls features a dream vision in which the narrator falls asleep while reading the Dream of Scipio and is ushered into a walled garden. He is chaperoned in the dream briefly by Scipio the Elder himself.
- William Langland, Piers Plowman or Visio Willelmi de Petro Ploughman (William's Vision of Piers Plowman) is an apocalyptic Middle English allegorical narrative attributed to William Langland, one of the great works of English literature. It is written in unrhymed alliterative verse divided into sections called passus (Latin for "step").
- Sir John Clanvowe, The Cuckoo and the Nightingale
- Anonymous, Parlement of the Thre [sic] Ages
- Anonymous, Wynnere and Wastoure
- Pearl Poet, Pearl
- The Vision of Tundale, a translation from the Latin Visio Tnugdali.
- John Lydgate, The Temple of Glass

=== Modern English ===
- John Bunyan, The Pilgrim's Progress
- Percy Bysshe Shelley, The Triumph of Life
- William Morris, News from Nowhere, A Dream of John Ball
- C.S. Lewis, The Great Divorce tells of a dream vision in which the author joins a group of the damned on a vacation bus trip to heaven, where they encounter various figures from their own pasts who try to entreat them to come and join the company of those in heaven.
- The Eagles, "Hotel California"
- Lewis Carroll's "Alice's Adventures in Wonderland" (1865 ) is in the form of a dream vision.
- James Joyce's (Irish novelist) "Finnegans Wake" (1939) consists of an immense cosmic dream.

=== Spanish ===
- Jorge Luis Borges' Las ruinas circulares (The Circular Ruins) – A man dreams another person into existence, only to discover that he himself is also a dream.
- Jorge Luis Borges' El otro (The Other) – The narrator (Borges himself) meets a younger version of himself, and they each believe the other is a dream.
- Julio Cortázar's La noche boca arriba (The Night Face Up) – A man switches between modern reality and an Aztec human sacrifice, with a final twist revealing which is the true dream.

=== Old Russian ===
- The Tale of Igor's Campaign
- Praying of Daniel the Immured
- About the whole thing
- Depth Book
- And some Old Russian letopises.

=== Scottish Gaelic ===
- See also Aisling, Scottish Gaelic literature
- Alasdair mac Mhaighstir Alasdair
- Dòmhnall Ruadh Chorùna

=== Ukrainian ===
- See also Ukrainian literature
- Taras Shevchenko's The Dream

=== Welsh ===
- Anonymous, The Dream of Rhonabwy, possibly a satire on the medieval dream vision
- Anonymous, The Dream of Macsen Wledig

== Bibliography ==
- Boris Yarkho (1989). "Средневековые латинские видения" [Восток-Запад: Исследования, переводы, публикации] (in Russian). Moscow. ISBN 5-02-016791-6.
