= Brian Anslay =

English royal administrator

Brian Anslay (died 1536 Darenth) was an English administrator for King Henry VII and King Henry VIII and translator. Anslay is notable for translating Christine de Pizan's The Book of the City of Ladies from French into English.

In 1521, Anslay translated the Le Livre de la cité des dames, publishing it under the title of the Boke of the Cyte of Ladies. In a preliminary copy of verses, the printer, Henry Pepwell, states that the translation was published for Richard Grey, 3rd Earl of Kent. The book consists of short stories about famous women, based on Boccaccio's work, De mulieribus claris (On Famous Women).

Anslay was yeoman of the wine cellar to Henry VIII. in 1528, the king gave Anslay a parcel of land in Bradwell-on-Sea, Essex. References suggest that Anslay served Henry VIII until at least 1533.

Anslay was married and had two sons. He died at Darenth, Kent, in 1536.
