= Master of the Épître d'Othéa =

French illuminator, active ca. 1403

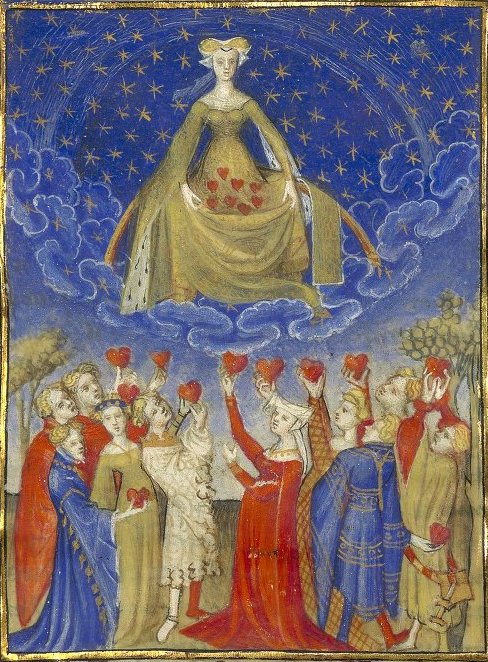
Illumination by the Master of the Épître d'Othéa in the Épître d'Othéa by Christine de Pizan: Venus receiving hearts (Paris, BnF Fr 606 f 6r)

The Master of the Épître d'Othéa, or sometimes Épître Master, was an artist and associated workshop making illuminated manuscripts in Paris during the first years of the 15th century. The workshop produced illustrations almost exclusively for Christine de Pizan, who ordered presentation copies of her books from it. The notname of the workshop is also derived from one of Christine de Pizan's books. Its lead artist may have been north Italian; stylistically the workshop is unconnected with contemporary Parisian illuminators and displays influences from early French humanist ideas and Trecento painting.

== History and production ==
The workshop was employed by Christine de Pizan in 1403 to make the artistic decoration for books containing her poem Mutacion de Fortune. Millard Meiss argued that the workshop consisted of one main artist and supervisor (the "master" in the notname), and four assistants. Christine de Pizan was one of the earliest professional female writers in Europe. The workshop provided Christine de Pizan with four luxurious presentation copies of the book, each individually illuminated, intended as gifts to some of the most influential princes of France, who were also the benefactors of Christine de Pizan. In late 1403 she could present one of these to Duke Philip the Bold, who was apparently pleased with it. Another copy was presented to Duke John of Berry a few months later. The four manuscripts have been preserved, and are now housed in the Royal Library of Belgium in Brussels, the Royal Library of the Netherlands in the Hague, Château de Chantilly outside Paris, and a private collection.

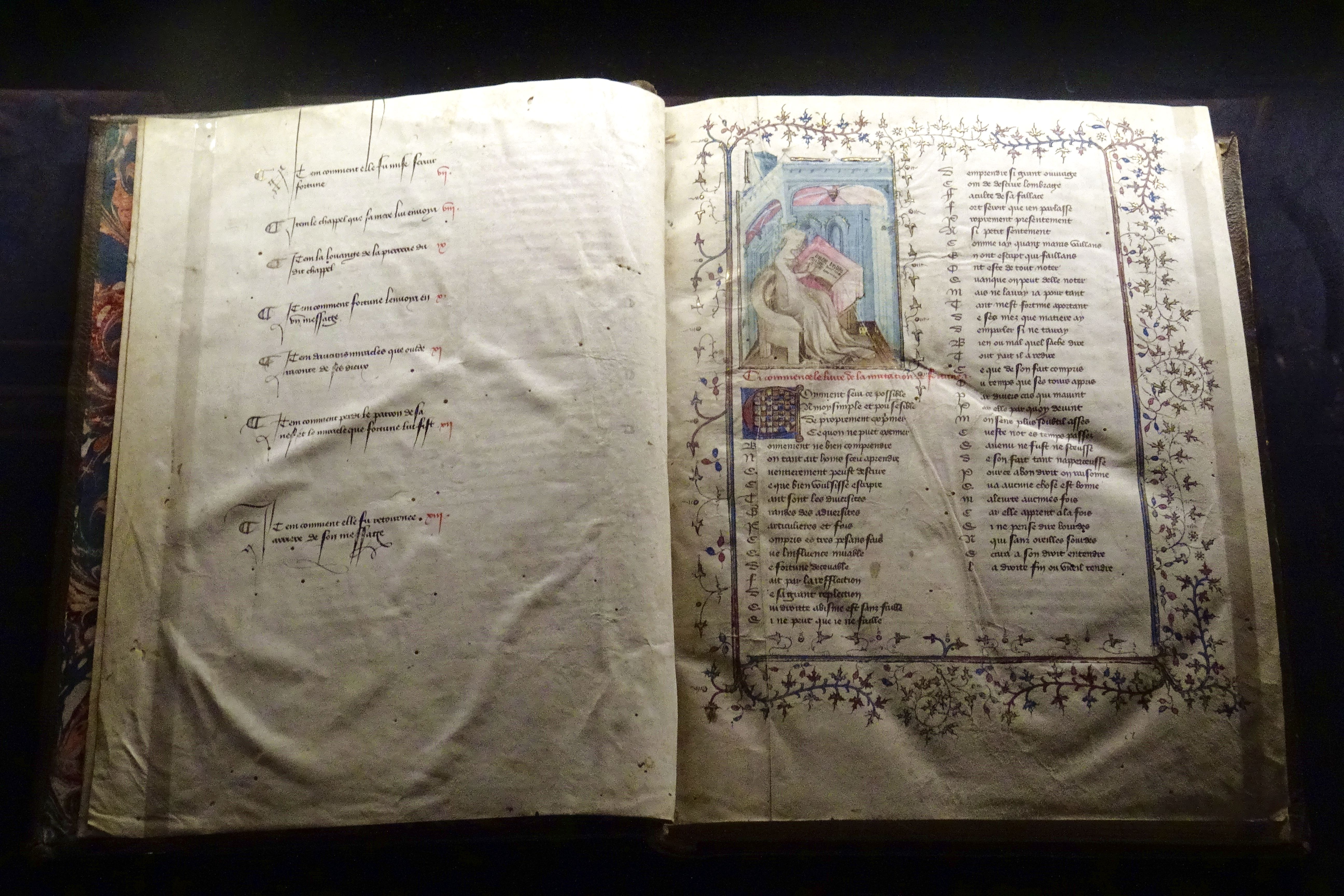
The Château de Chantilly copy of the Mutacion de Fortune

The Master of the Épître d'Othéa illustrated a luxury copy of Christine de Pizan's poem L'Épître d'Othéa a Hector (Letter of Othea to Hector) sometime between 1405 and 1408. This, the principal work of the workshop, has provided the notname for the workshop. L'Épître d'Othéa a Hector was at the time Christine de Pizan's most popular book. It was also a book that was well suited for illumination, as each of the hundred chapters provided natural opportunities for an illustration. The manuscript illustrated by the Master of the Épître d'Othéa was probably made for Duke Louis I of Orléans and was later acquired by John of Berry. It is today preserved in the French national library in Paris (BnF Fr 606).

Two other works by Christine de Pizan, l'Advision Christine and Corps de policie, were also illustrated by the Master of the Épître d'Othéa. Apart from illustrations of Christine de Pizan's works, only three other manuscripts associated with the workshop are known: one book on hunting made for the Crown Prince of France, and one Livre des merveilles or "book of wonders". The third, a Grandes Chroniques de France illustrated by the Master of the Épître d'Othéa may have been a gift for Isabeau of Bavaria; Christine de Pizan was in contact with Queen Isabeau and may somehow have been involved in this transaction, too. Works by the Master of the Épître d'Othéa are thus only known to have been produced between 1403 and 1408, and almost exclusively for Christine de Pizan.

== Style ==
The style of the Master of the Épître d'Othéa is in the words of Millard Meiss, "so original and so distinctive that the identification of his work presents no problems", and art historian Inès Villela-Petit has similarly underlined the originality of the artistic workshop. Considering the lack of stylistic connection with other Parisian workshops of the time, it has been suggested that the main artist was from northern Italy, or at least studied there. The style shows influence from early French humanist ideas and Trecento painting. Meiss underlined that the Master of the Épître d'Othéa treated subjects usually innovatively and independently from an iconographic point of view, fusing antique elements passed through humanist thought with an emotional register derived from contemporary religious painting.

== Appraisal ==
Millard Meiss, who coined the notname, considered the artistic quality of the workshop high and called it "one of the original and imaginative illuminators of cosmopolitan France." Christopher de Hamel similarly names the Master of the Épître d'Othéa as a representative of the Parisian illuminators active in the decades around 1400 and thanks to whom the time can be considered a golden age for manuscript production.
