= The Book of the City of Ladies =

1405 book by Christine de Pizan

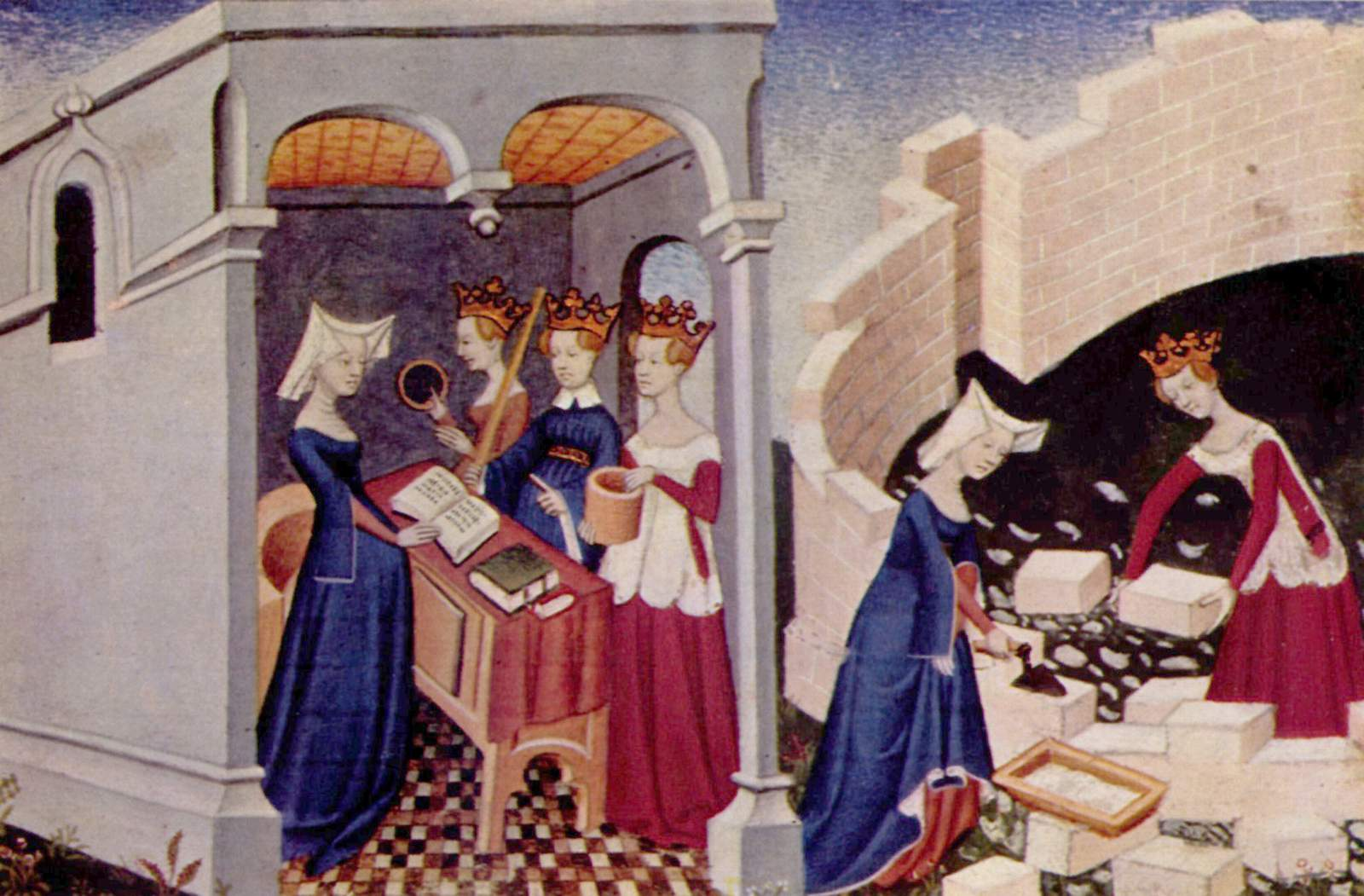
- Illustration from The Book of the City of Ladies by the Master of the Cité des dames
- Author: Christine de Pizan
- Language: French, Middle french
- Subject: feminist
- Genre: Prose Work
- Publication date: circa 1405

The Book of the City of Ladies, or Le Livre de la Cité des Dames, is a book written by Christine de Pizan believed to have been finished by 1405. Perhaps Pizan's most famous literary work, it is her second work of lengthy prose. Pizan uses the vernacular French language to compose the book, but she often uses Latin-style syntax and conventions within her French prose. The book serves as her formal response to Jean de Meun's popular Roman de la Rose. Pizan combats Meun's statements about women by creating an allegorical city of ladies. She defends women by collecting a wide array of famous women throughout history. These women are "housed" in the City of Ladies, which is actually the book. As Pizan builds her city, she uses each famous woman as a building block for not only the walls and houses of the city, but also as building blocks for her thesis. Each woman introduced to the city adds to Pizan's argument towards women as valued participants in society. She also advocates in favour of education for women.

Christine de Pizan also finished by 1405 The Treasure of the City of Ladies (Le tresor de la cité des dames de degré en degré, also known as The Book of the Three Virtues), a manual of education, dedicated to Princess Margaret of Burgundy. This aims to educate women of all estates, the latter telling women who have husbands: "If she wants to act prudently and have the praise of both the world and her husband, she will be cheerful to him all the time". Her Book and Treasure are her two best-known works, along with the poem Ditie de Jehanne D'Arc.

== Summary ==
=== Part I ===
Part I opens with Christine reading from Matheolus's Lamentations, a work from the thirteenth century that addresses marriage and argues that women make men's lives miserable. Upon reading these words, Christine becomes upset and feels ashamed to be a woman: "This thought inspired such a great sense of disgust and sadness in me that I began to despise myself and the whole of my sex as an aberration in nature". The three Virtues then appear to Christine, and each lady tells Christine what her role will be in helping her build the City of Ladies. Lady Reason, a virtue developed by Christine for the purpose of her book, is the first to join Christine and helps her build the external walls of the city. She answers Christine's questions about why some men slander women, helping Christine to prepare the ground on which the city will be built. She tells Christine to "take the spade of [her] intelligence and dig deep to make a trench all around [the city] … [and Reason will] help to carry away the hods of earth on [her] shoulders." These "hods of earth" are the past beliefs Christine has held. Christine, in the beginning of the text, believed that women must truly be bad because she "could scarcely find a moral work by any author which didn't devote some chapter or paragraph to attacking the female sex. [Therefore she] had to accept [these authors] unfavourable opinion[s] of women since it was unlikely that so many learned men, who seemed to be endowed with such great intelligence and insight into all things, could possibly have lied on so many different occasions." Christine is not using reason to discover the merits of women. She believes all that she reads instead of putting her mind to listing all the great deeds women have accomplished. To help Christine see reason, Lady Reason comes and teaches Christine. She helps Christine dispel her own self-consciousness and the negative thoughts of past writers. By creating Lady Reason, Christine not only teaches her own allegorical self, but also her readers. She gives not only herself reason, but also gives readers, and women, reason to believe that women are not evil or useless creatures but instead have a significant place within society.

==== Women discussed ====
The following 36 women are discussed in Part I of the Book of the City of Ladies.

- Mary Magdalene
- Queen of Sheba
- Fredegund
- Blanche of Castile
- Jeanne d'Évreux
- Blanche of France
- Marie of Blois, Duchess of Anjou
- Semiramis
- Amazons: Thamiris, Menalippe, Hippolyta, Penthesilea, Synoppe, Lampheto, Marpesia, Orithyia
- Zenobia
- Artemisia II of Caria
- Lilia, mother of Theodoric
- Camilla
- Laodice of Cappadocia
- Cloelia
- Cornificia
- Faltonia Betitia Proba
- Sappho
- Manto
- Medea
- Circe
- Carmenta
- Minerva
- Ceres
- Isis
- Arachne
- Pamphile
- Thamaris
- Irene
- Iaia
- Sempronia
- Woman of Valor
- Gaia Cirilla (also known as Tanaquil)
- Dido
- Ops
- Lavinia

=== Part II ===
In Part II, Lady Rectitude says she will help Christine "construct the houses and buildings inside the walls of the City of Ladies" and fill it with inhabitants who are "valiant ladies of great renown". As they build, Lady Rectitude informs Christine with examples and "stories of pagan, Hebrew, and Christian ladies" who possessed the gift of prophecy, chastity, or devotion to their families and others. Christine and Lady Rectitude also discuss the institution of marriage, addressing Christine's questions regarding men's claims about the bad qualities women bring to marriage. Lady Rectitude corrects these misconceptions with examples of women who loved their husbands and acted virtuously, noting that those women who are evil toward their husbands are "like creatures who go totally against their nature". Lady Rectitude also refutes allegations that women are unchaste, inconstant, unfaithful, and mean by nature through her stories. This part ends with Christine addressing women and asking them to pray for her as she continues her work with Lady Justice to complete the city.

==== Women discussed ====
The following 92 women are discussed in Part II of the Book of the City of Ladies.

- Sibyls: Erythraean Sibyl, Cumaean Sibyl
- Deborah
- Elizabeth
- Anna the Prophetess
- Queen of Sheba
- Cassandra
- Basina of Thuringia
- Carmenta
- Theodora
- Dripetrua
- Hypsipyle
- the virgin Claudine (Claudia (vestal))
- Roman Charity
- Griselda
- Hypsicratea
- Triaria
- Artemisia I of Caria
- Argea
- Agrippina the Elder
- Julia
- Aemilia Tertia
- Xanthippe
- Pompeia Paulina
- Sulpicia (wife of Lentulus Cruscellio)
- Lacedaemonian women who saved their husbands from execution
- Porcia (wife of Brutus)
- Curia
- Cornelia Metella
- Andromache
- Antonina (wife of Belisarius)
- Stateira II
- Mary, mother of Jesus
- Bithia
- Judith
- Esther
- The Rape of the Sabine Women
- Veturia
- Clotilde
- Catulla
- Saint Genevieve
- Hortensia
- Novella d'Andrea
- Susanna
- Sarah
- Rebecca
- Ruth
- Penelope
- Mariamne I
- Antonia Minor
- Sulpitia
- Lucretia
- Chiomara
- Hippo
- Sicambrian women
- Verginia
- Claudia Octavia
- Claudia Antonia
- Athaliah
- Jezebel
- Brunhilda of Austrasia
- Florence of Rome
- Wife of Bernabo the Genovan
- Leaena
- Dido
- Medea
- Thisbe
- Hero
- Ghismonda of Salerno
- Lisabetta of Messina
- Dame de Fayel
- Dame de Vergi
- Iseult
- Deianira
- Juno
- Europa
- Jocasta
- Medusa
- Helen of Troy
- Polyxena
- Claudia Quinta
- Blanche of Castile
- Busa of Canosa di Puglia
- Marguerite, Dame de la Riviere
- Isabeau of Bavaria
- Joan of Armagnac
- Valentina Visconti, Duchess of Orléans
- Margaret of Bavaria
- Marie, Duchess of Auvergne
- Margaret of Burgundy, Duchess of Bavaria
- Isabella of Valois
- Marie of Savoy, Countess of Saint-Pol
- Anne de Bourbon

=== Part III ===
In Part III, Lady Justice joins with Christine to "add the finishing touches" to the city, including bringing a queen to rule the city. Lady Justice tells Christine of female saints who were praised for their martyrdom. At the close of this part, Christine makes another address to all women announcing the completion of the City of Ladies. She beseeches them to defend and protect the city and to follow their queen (the Virgin Mary). She also warns the women against the lies of slanderers, saying, "Drive back these treacherous liars who use nothing but tricks and honeyed words to steal from you that which you should keep safe above all else: your chastity and your glorious good name".

==== Women discussed ====
The following 37 women are discussed in Part III of the Book of the City of Ladies.

- The Virgin Mary
- The Virgin Mary's sisters and Mary Magdalene
- Saint Catherine of Alexandria
- Saint Margaret of Antioch
- Saint Lucy of Rome
- Martina of Rome
- Saint Lucy (different than the Saint Lucy above)
- Saint Benedicta
- Saint Fausta
- Saints Cyprian and Justina
- Blessed Eulalia
- Saint Macra
- Saint Fida
- Blessed Marciana
- Saint Euphemia
- Blessed Theodosina
- Saint Barbara
- Saint Dorothy
- offhanded mention of Saint Cecilia, Saint Agnes of Rome, and Saint Agatha of Sicily
- Saint Christina of Bolsena
- Felicitas of Rome
- Julitta
- blessed Blandina
- Marina the Monk
- Euphrosyne of Alexandria
- Anastasia of Sirmium and Agape, Chionia, and Irene
- Blessed Theodota
- Saint Natalia of Nicomedia
- Saint Afra
- Several ladies who served the Apostles: Drusiana, Susanna, Maximilla, Saint Ephigenia, Helena of Adiabene, Saint Plautilla, Saints Julian and Basilissa

== Boccaccio's influence ==
Christine's main source for information was Giovanni Boccaccio's De mulieribus claris (On Famous Women), possibly in the French version, Des Cleres et Nobles Femmes. This text was a biographical treatise on ancient famous women. Christine also cited from Boccaccio's Decameron in the latter stages of The City of Ladies. The tales of Ghismonda and Lisabetta, for example, are cited from Boccaccio's Decameron.

Boccaccio's influence can be seen in Christine's stance on female education. In the tale of Rhea Ilia, Boccaccio advocates for the right of young women to choose a secular or religious life. He states that it is harmful to place young girls into convents while they are "ignorant or too young or under coercion". Boccaccio states that girls should be "well brought up from childhood in their father's home and taught honesty and virtuous behavior. Then when they are grown and know full well what they are doing" they can choose the life of monasticism. Boccaccio believes that young girls need to be taught about life and virtues before they are consecrated to God.

While he does not say women should have a formal education, he is still advocating for women to have a say in their lives and the right to be well informed about their possible futures. Therefore, Boccaccio's belief in educating young girls about secular and religious life could have acted as a stepping stone for Christine's belief in female education. Boccaccio's outlook was however, according to Margaret King and Albert Rabil, "misogynist, for it singled out for praise those women who possessed the traditional virtues of chastity, silence, and obedience. Women who were active in the public realm ... were depicted as suffering terrible punishments for entering into the masculine sphere."

Boccaccio's text is mainly used for Parts I and II of the book, while Part III is more reliant upon Jean de Vignay's Miroir historical (1333). This text is the French translation of the historical portions of Speculum Maius, an encyclopedia by Vincent of Beauvais that was begun after 1240.

== Themes ==
The Book of the City of Ladies is an allegorical society in which the word "lady" is defined as a woman of noble spirit, instead of noble birth. The book, and therefore the city, contains women of past eras, ranging from pagans to ancient Jews to medieval Christian saints. The book includes discussion between Christine de Pizan and the three female Virtues which are sent to aid Christine build the city. These Virtues – Reason, Rectitude, and Justice – help Christine build the foundations and houses of the city, as well as pick the women who will reside in the city of ladies. Each woman chosen by the Virtues to live in the city acts as a positive example for other women to follow. These women are also examples of the positive influences women have had on society.

Christine asks the virtues if women should be taught as men are and why some men think women should not be educated. Other questions that are explored are: the criminality of rape, the natural affinity in women to learn, and their talent for government.

== See also ==
- Biographies of Exemplary Women (Liu Xiang, 18 BC)
- The Legend of Good Women (Chaucer)
- De Mulieribus Claris (Boccaccio)
- Le Livre de la mutation de fortune (Pisan, 1403 AD)
- Brian Anslay, translated the Le Livre de la cité des dames, publishing it under the title of the Boke of the Cyte of Ladies

== Sources ==
Original sources

- De Pizan, Christine. The Book of the City of Ladies. 1405. Trans. Rosalind Brown-Grant. London: Penguin, 1999. Print.
- Boccaccio, Giovanni. De mulieribus claris. English & Latin. Famous women. Ed. by Virginia Brown. Cambridge: Harvard University Press, 2001.
- Pizan, Christine. A Medieval woman's mirror of honor: the treasury of the city of ladies. Trans. by Charity Cannon Willard, ed. by Madeleine Pelner Cosman. Tenafly: Bard Hall Press, 1989.

Secondary sources

- Blumenfeld-Kosinski, Renate and Kevin Brownlee. The Selected Writings of Christine De Pizan: New Translations, Criticism. New York, Norton Critical Editions, 1997.
- Brabant, Margaret. Politics, gender, and genre: the political thought of Christine de Pizan. Boulder: Westview Press, 1992.
- Brown-Grant, Rosalind. Introduction. The Book of the City of Ladies by Christine Pizan. 1405. Trans. Rosalind Brown-Grant. London: Penguin, 1999. xvi-xxxv. Print.
- Fenster, Thelma. "'Perdre son latin': Christine de Pizan and Vernacular Humanism." Christine de Pizan and the Categories of Difference. Ed. Marilynn Desmond. Minneapolis: U of Minnesota P: 1998. 91–107. Print. Medieval Cultures 14.
- Forhan, Kate Langdon. The Political Theory of Chrisine Pizan. Burlington: Ashgate: 2002. Print. Women and Gender in the Early Mod. World.
- Gaunt, Simon. Gender and genre in medieval French literature. Cambridge: Cambridge University Press, 1995.
- King, Margaret, and Albert Rabil. Introduction. "Dialogue on the Infinity of Love." Tullia d'Aragona. 1547. Trans. Rinaldina Russell and Bruce Merry. Chicago: The University of Chicago, 1997.
- Miller, Paul Allen, Platter, Charles, and Gold, Barbara K. Sex and gender in medieval and Renaissance texts: the Latin tradition. Albany: State University of New York Press, 1997.
- Quilligan, Maureen. The allegory of female authority: Christine de Pizan's Cité des dames. Ithaca: Cornell University Press, 1991.
