= Le livre du chemin de long estude =

1402-3 poem by Christine de Pizan

Le livre du chemin de long estude ("The book of the path of long study") is a first-person dream allegory by Christine de Pizan. Composed in 1402–03, it presents a critique of the moral state of the world and particularly France, lamenting the results of warfare.

The poem was dedicated to Charles VI of France; Christine de Pizan presented the first manuscript to John, Duke of Berry. Philip the Bold, Duke of Burgundy, Louis I, Duke of Orléans, and Queen Isabeau of Bavaria also received copies.

== Contents ==
As the first-person narrator sits in her study, she reads Boethius's The Consolation of Philosophy, which cheers her momentarily and, as she falls asleep, prompts a vision in which the Cumaean Sibyl comes to her and takes her on a journey to Mount Parnassus, the abode of philosophers and poets, then to the Holy Land and Asia, and ends at the Earthly Paradise, of which the Christine narrator is offered a vision and explanation. The journey continues through the Celestial spheres, before she is returned to earth.

Whilst in the celestial spheres, the Christine narrator witnesses a debate between four allegorical figures (Chivalry, Justice, Wisdom, and Nobility) over the characteristics that the emperor of the world should possess. A fifth allegorical figure, Lady Reason, presides over the debate. The group decides that such an emperor must be chosen at the French court; Christine is appointed as the messenger who should deliver their conclusions to France. Then, there is a knock at the bedroom door, and the dream is over.

== Background and literary models ==
The book is one of two "lengthy allegories on political and philosophical themes" by de Pizan; the other is Le livre de la mutacion de fortune. The poem was composed a dozen or so years after the death of Christine de Pizan's husband, and its dream is said to follow a sorrowful meditation on his death. As Renate Blumenfeld-Kosinski put it, Dante's Divine Comedy is the text's "key literary model", with the Sibyl replacing Virgil as a guide, and Christine taking the place of Dante. Blumenfeld-Kosinski notes that this "is the very first literary work in French that is explicitly based on Dante's Comedy. The allegorical figure of Lady Reason is also found in the Roman de la Rose, in Boethius (as the Lady Philosophy), and in Petrarch's Secret Book, and her role is similar to that of Beatrice in the Divine Comedy.

== Publication history and legacy ==
The book was, like many others by Christine de Pizan, made for a number of patrons; though dedicated to Charles VI of France; manuscripts were presented to John, Duke of Berry, Philip the Bold, Duke of Burgundy, Louis I, Duke of Orléans, and Queen Isabeau of Bavaria. There are four known illustrated versions extant: Harley 4431 (part of the collection de Pizan prepared for Isabeau of Bavaria), BNF 836, and Brussels 10982 and 10983. The four all have different illustrations of different scenes, placing different accents on textual aspects; for instance, Harley 4431 has eight illustrations, of which four are set in the heavens, thus "privileging the celestial portion of Christine's journey".

In 1549 a modernized prose version was produced by Jean Chaperon and printed by Estienne Groulleau in Geneva, under the title Le Chemin de long estude de Dame Cristine de Pise; this was the last printed edition of any of her texts in the sixteenth century. Chaperon gives de Pizan all the credit for its contents, and according to Cynthia J. Brown, the publication of this edition meant that "Christine de Pizan's authorship and literary reputation had become firmly established by the mid-sixteenth century and that French publishers were directing her work to a male and female audience".

== Themes ==
=== Female agency ===
Scholars have recognized de Pizan's gendering of formerly male discourse in the Chemin. According to Mary Weitzel Gibbons, this appropriation take place in the text as well as its accompanying illustrations. In the text, de Pizan takes the place of Dante, while the Sibyl takes the place of Virgil, replacing two male authorities by two female ones. In the illustrations, a similar replacement is shown: "every illumination of the Chemin portrays the Sibyl and Christine and thereby fixes female agency in the realm of interpretation and authority".

=== Reception of authority ===
Besides appropriating some of Dante's authority, the Chemin also leans on Ovid; the illustration of the Bath of the Muses, for example, comes from the Ovide Moralisé, which had derived it from book 5 of the Metamorphoses. But where Christine's text does not stray far from the Ovide, focusing on the purity of the water (which flows from Mount Helicon, presided over by Apollo, and thus a site of male authority), the image puts the Christine figure and the Sibyl, as well as the female muses, front and center.
