= Charity Cannon Willard =

American scholar (1914–2005)

Charity Cannon Willard (August 9, 1914 – June 5, 2005) was an American scholar best known for drawing attention to the 15th-century poet and author Christine de Pizan in the English-speaking world. Willard translated and wrote critical editions of Pizan's work, and "is widely regarded as the world's preeminent scholar" on Christine de Pizan. Honoured with several academic awards, she is regarded by scholars as a trailblazer in the study of Pizan.

== Career ==
Willard graduated from Hiram College in 1934 with a Bachelor of Arts, going on to receive her Masters of Arts in French from Smith College in 1936, and attained a PhD in Romance Philology at Radcliffe College in 1940. Willard's first published work on Pizan was from her PhD dissertation, and was published in 1958. Her husband, Sumner Willard, was an officer and professor of foreign languages at the United States Military Academy in West Point, NY; officer's wives were not allowed to work full-time outside of the home. As a result, she declined a position as a professor at Brown University, instead filling in for professor's leaves of absences and travelling Europe in search of manuscripts of Christine de Pizan. She eventually accepted a full-time position as a French and Spanish professor at LadyCliff College (1961–1979), becoming the first West Point colonel wife to have a full-time professional career. After her retirement in 1979, Willard began to focus on her studies of Pizan, and was the author and editor of many works concerning Pizan.

== Contributions to the history of feminism ==
Pizan was a significant historic feminist figure as France's first "woman of letters". However, before Dr. Willard's contributions, studies on Pizan were limited in the English-speaking world. By translating many of Pizan's works and compiling her bibliographical information, Willard drew attention to the now-iconic feminist. A review by feminist Ms. magazine acknowledged the significance of Willard's contribution to women's history. Scholars are grateful for Willard's pioneering studies on Pizan, as her works spearheaded further studies on the poet-author.

== Major scholarly works ==
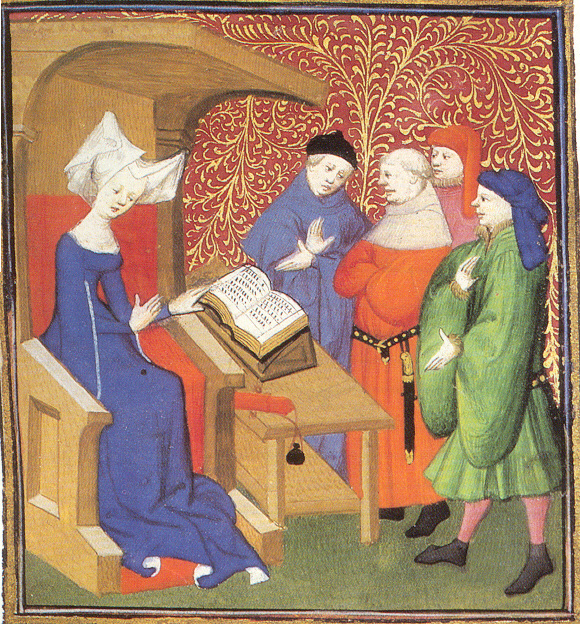
Christine de Pizan giving a lecture

Below is a list of Charity Cannon Willard's major published works:

- The "Livre de Paix": A Critical Edition – the dissertation for Willard's PhD, published in 1958.
- Christine de Pizan: Her Life and Works - studies on Pizan, published in 1984.
- A critical edition of Christine de Pizan's Livres des trois Vertus with Eric Hicks, published in 1989.
- Translated Pizan's Livres des trois Vertus into English as A Medieval Woman's Mirror of Honor – The Treasury of The City of Ladies, published in 1989.
- Editor of The Writings of Christine de Pizan – published in 1993.
- Editor of Sumner Willard's English translation of The Book of Deeds of Arms and of Chivalry by Christine de Pizan, published in 1999.
- Wrote the foreword in Christine de Pizan: A Casebook, published in 2003.
- Editor of Les Faites d'armes et de chevalerie: Édition critique until her death (she did not finish this work).

Willard also published a substantial number of book articles and reviews, journal articles, and replies to articles that are not listed here.

== Awards ==
Willard was awarded the title of a Chevalier de l'Ordre des Palmes Académiques in the early 1980's (date is disputed), an award from the French government which acknowledged her contributions to the studies of Christine de Pizan. In 1988, she was awarded the Distinguished Alumni Award from Hiram College, and was recognized with an L.H.D. from Saint Mary College in 1993. In 1998, Willard received a Smith College medal as a distinguished alumna.

== Family ==
Charity's husband, Sumner Willard (1916–1995), was a 7th great-grandson (10th generation descendant) of the Massachusetts colonist, Simon Willard (1605–1676).
