= Renate Blumenfeld-Kosinski =

American medievalist and writer (born 1952)

- Born: 1952 (age 73–74)
- Occupations: Writer, editor, historian, medievalist, academic
- Known for: Studying Christine de Pizan, Ermine de Reims and Saint Colette
- Title: Distinguished Professor Emerita
- Spouse: Antoni
- Awards: National Endowment of the Humanities (1988, 1991, 2003) and American Council of Learned Societies (2008) Grants, Scholarly Edition in Translation Award (2022)

Academic background
- Education: Princeton University
- Thesis: [ProQuest 303080458 The Traditions of the Old French "Roman de Thèbes": A Poetico-Historical Analysis] (1980)
- Doctoral advisor: Karl David Uitti

Academic work
- Discipline: Literature, history, feminist studies
- Sub-discipline: Medieval French literature, literary history
- Notable works: The Strange Case of Ermine de Reims, Poets, Saints, and Visionaries of the Great Schism
- Website: sites.pitt.edu/~medren/faculty/rbkmain.html

Renate Elisabeth Blumenfeld-Kosinski, also known as Renate Kosinski, (born 1952) is a German-American medievalist, literary historian, scholar of medieval French literature, editor, writer, and academic. She is known for her books and research on medieval political texts, mysticism, medieval visionary women, religious literature, saints' lives, and the Great Schism of the Western Church. As of 2019, Blumenfeld-Kosinski is a Distinguished Professor Emerita at the University of Pittsburgh, and has been a Fellow of the Medieval Academy of America (MAA) since 2014. She served as the president of the MAA from 2020 to 2021. Blumenfeld-Kosinski won the 2022 Scholarly Edition in Translation Award from the Society for the Study of Early Modern Women and Gender (SSEMWG) for her translation of Two Lives of Saint Colette: With a Selection of Letters by, to, and about Colette (2022, Iter Press).

== Biography ==
Blumenfeld-Kosinski was born in 1952 in Berlin, Germany. She earned a B.A. in French and English literature from Bonn University (1974), received a B.A. in French from Rutgers University (1975), and an M.A. from Princeton University (1977). Blumenfeld-Kosinski studied for a year (1978–79) at the Ecole Normale Supérieure, the Ecole Nationale des Chartes, and the Ecole des hautes études in Paris. She graduated with a Ph.D. in Romance Languages from Princeton University in 1980. Her thesis was titled 'The Traditions of the Old French "Roman de Thèbes": A Poetico-Historical Analysis' under the supervision of Karl David Uitti.

Since 1978 she has been married to Antoni A. Kosinski, born 1930 in Warsaw, Poland, Distinguished Professor of Mathematics emeritus at Rutgers University.

Blumenfeld-Kosinski began her academic career specializing in Medieval French literature, focusing on the literature of the 12th through 15th centuries. Her scholarship frequently explores religious visions, women's mysticism, and the socio-political contexts of late medieval Europe.

She taught at Columbia University (Mellon Post-doctoral Fellow 1981–1983, Assistant Professor 1983–1989, Associate Professor 1989–1993), and then moved to the University of Pittsburgh in 1994, where she served as Professor (1998–2015) and became Distinguished Professor in the Department of French and Italian (2015–2019). She also served as director of the Medieval and Renaissance Studies Program and as department chair at Pittsburgh.

In June 2009, Blumenfeld-Kosinski co-organized an international conference in Nicosia, Cyprus, titled "The Age of Philippe de Mézières: Fourteenth Century Piety and Politics between France, Venice, and Cyprus." This event, which explored the spiritual and political dynamics of the 14th century, particularly the life and works of Philippe de Mézières, brought together over thirty scholars from various disciplines. Blumenfeld-Kosinski collaborated with Christopher Schabel, Nicholas Coureas, and Kiril Petkov to organize the conference, which featured a plenary lecture by the historian Philippe Contamine on Mézières' maritime and spiritual journeys between the West and the East.

Blumenfeld-Kosinski was awarded several fellowships from the National Endowment for the Humanities, as well as a grant from the American Council of Learned Societies in recognition of her contributions to medieval studies. She has been a Fellow of the Medieval Academy of America (MAA) since 2014. Blumenfeld-Kosinski also served as the president of the MAA from 2020 to 2021.

In November 2015, just a few days after the Paris attacks, Blumenfeld-Kosinski delivered a public lecture at the Académie des Inscriptions et Belles-Lettres. Her talk, titled "Le double rayonnement de Pierre Dubois et de son traité De Recuperatione Terrae Sanctae (1307)," explored medieval crusade theory, with a focus on the revolutionary role Pierre Dubois envisioned for women in education and diplomacy. She also examined how Dubois' ideas resonated with 19th-century colonial debates, particularly through Ernest Renan's interpretations of his work.

=== Research ===
Blumenfeld-Kosinski's 1990 Not of Woman Born: Representations of Caesarean Birth in Medieval and Renaissance Culture explored how medieval and Renaissance midwives, physicians, and visual artists performed Caesarean sections when women had died during childbirth, how manuscript illuminations depicted the operation, and where the term originated.

In 1997, she returned to some of the themes of her dissertation with her book Reading Myth in order to show how classical mythology functioned as a major source for medieval French literature and how it was transformed to serve new purposes in a Christian context.

Her 2006 book Poets, Saints, and Visionaries of the Great Schism, 1378-1417 delves into the role of literature and visionary experiences during the schism and the ways in which poets and visionaries of the time reacted to and tried to intervene in this period of ecclesiastical turmoil.

Blumenfeld-Kosinski's research covers Medieval French literature, medical history, female mysticism, political poetry, and the historical context of the Great Western Schism. She has also contributed to the understanding of little-known figures like Ermine de Reims, a 14th-century visionary, through her book The Strange Case of Ermine de Reims: A Medieval Woman Between Demons and Saints (University of Pennsylvania Press, 2015).

In a 2022 interview with Danièle Cybulskie’s The Medieval Podcast, (Note: She appeared on the podcast twice, in 2022 and in 2023.) Blumenfeld-Kosinsk described Ermine de Reims as a largely unknown 14th-century peasant woman who lived through significant hardship. Born just after the Great Plague and dying in 1396 at around forty years old, Ermine was a farmer’s wife who fell on difficult times, especially after becoming a widow. She moved to Reims and made a living by selling straw. However, Ermine became closely connected with an Augustinian cleric named Jean Le Graveur, (Note: Jean Le Graveur was an Augustinian cleric who became closely associated with Ermine de Reims during the last months of her life. He served as her confessor and spiritual guide, documenting her mystical experiences and demonic attacks. Their relationship was one of religious mentorship, where Jean Le Graveur took an active role in recording her revelations and supporting her spiritually through her trials.) and during the last ten months of her life, she experienced terrifying demonic attacks. These supernatural occurrences, including apparitions of animals, snakes, devilish women, and men in leathery outfits, haunted her night and day. Despite being illiterate, Ermine was deeply interested in the Western Schism, a church crisis of her time, which drew Renate’s attention to her. Ermine’s confessor, believing her experiences to be significant, ensured that her revelations were written down. Blumenfeld-Kosinski found Ermine’s story of torment and mystical visions deeply moving, particularly when comparing her to other mystics like Christina von Stommeln.

One of her major focal points has been the late medieval writer Christine de Pizan (c. 1364-c. 1431) to whom she has devoted numerous articles and many of whose works she translated. (Note: See under Translations.) Another major interest is Saint Colette of Corbie (1381–1447). Her Two Lives of Saint Colette: With a Selection of Letters by, to, and about Colette (2022, Iter Press) presents translations of two medieval accounts of the life of Saint Colette of Corbie, a significant figure in the reform of the Franciscan orders during the 15th century. The volume includes translations of the Lives written by Pierre de Vaux, Colette's confessor, and Sister Perrine de Baume, a nun from one of the Colettine monasteries. Her translations are based on the 1911 edition by Ubald d’Alençon and provide insight into Colette's life, her spiritual influence, and her interactions with contemporary religious and political figures. The book also includes a selection of letters by, to, and about Colette, color illustrations from a Ghent manuscript, and a map of the monasteries she reformed or founded. The accompanying introduction and notes provide context on Colette's impact, medieval hagiography, and the socio-political landscape of 15th-century France. In 2023, she appeared again on The Medievalist Podcast, where she talked about Saint Colette of Corbie, one of the major yet lesser known French saints according to Kosinski. In this 2023 episode, RBK highlighted the rare situation of a saint, Colette of Corbie (1381-1447), about whom two contemporaries, her confessor Pierre de Vaux and Sister Perrine de Baume, wrote biographies. Both stressed her devotion and asceticism while downplaying her role as one of the great reformers of the Franciscan Order, but some differences between a male and a female perspective are discernible. Both biographies were translated by RBK. (Note: See under translations.)

In 2023, on the occasion of the publication of a bilingual (Middle French and German) edition of Christine de Pizan's Le livre des faiz d'armes et de chevallerie by Earl Jeffrey Richards and Danielle Buschinger, the publisher De Gruyter invited Richards and RBK to give an overview of de Pizan studies during the last forty years. Both Richards and RBK have devoted a great part of their research to Christine de Pizan since their days in Graduate School at Princeton University and most recently had collaborated on the translation of de Pizan's Othea's Letter to Hector. (Note: See under translations)

== Selected publications ==
=== Books ===
- Blumenfeld-Kosinski, R., 1990. Not of woman born: representations of caesarean birth in medieval and Renaissance culture. Cornell University Press.
- Blumenfeld-Kosinski, R., 1997. Reading myth: classical mythology and its interpretations in medieval French literature. Stanford University Press.
- Blumenfeld-Kosinski, R., 2006. Poets, saints, and visionaries of the Great Schism, 1378-1417. Penn State Press.
- Blumenfeld-Kosinski, R., 2015. The strange case of Ermine de Reims: a medieval woman between demons and saints. University of Pennsylvania Press.

=== Co-Edited volumes ===
- Blumenfeld-Kosinski, R. and Timea Szell, eds. 1991 Images of sainthood in medieval Europe. Cornell University Press.
- Translatio Studii: Essays by His Students in Honor of Karl D. Uitti for His Sixty-Fifth Birthday. Ed. with K. Brownlee, Mary Speer, and Lori Walters. Amsterdam: Rodopi, 2000.
- Blumenfeld-Kosinski, R., Daniel Russell, and Luise von Flotow. 2001. The politics of translation in the Middle Ages and the Rennaissance (No. 233). University of Ottawa Press.
- Philippe de Mézières and His Age: Piety and Politics in the Fourteenth Century. Co-edited with Kiril Petkov. The Medieval Mediterranean 91. Leyden: Brill, 2012.
- Philippe de Mézières et l’Europe: nouvelle histoire, nouveaux espaces, nouveaux langages. Co-edited with Joël Blanchard. Geneva: Droz, 2017.
- Philippe de Mézières: Rhétorique et poétique. Co-edited with Joël Blanchard and A. Calvet. Geneva: Droz, 2019.

=== Translations and editing ===
- Margaret of Oingt, 1990. The Writings of Margaret of Oingt, Medieval Prioress and Mystic. Translated from Latin and Francoprovençal with an Introduction and an Interpretive Essay. Newburyport, Mass.: Focus Press. Reissued by Boydell and Brewer.
- Christine de Pizan, 1997. The Selected Writings of Christine de Pizan: A Norton Critical Edition. Edited by R. Brown-Grant, translations by R. Brown-Grant and Kevin Brownlee. New York: W.W. Norton.
- de Sabanac, R. and Zanacchi, S., 2010. Two Women of the Great Schism: The Revelations of Constance de Rabastens by Raymond de Sabanac and the Life of Ursulina of Parma by Simone Zanacchi. With Bruce L. Venarde. Toronto: Center for Reformation and Renaissance Studies. (The Other Voice in Early Modern Europe, Toronto Series 3).
- Christine de Pizan, 2017. Othea’s Letter to Hector. "The Other Voice in Early Modern Europe," Toronto Series 57. With Earl Jeffrey Richards. Arizona Center for Medieval and Renaissance Studies.
- De Vaux, P. and De Baume, S.P., 2022. Two Lives of Saint Colette: With a Selection of Letters By, To, and about Colette (Vol. 94). Iter Press. ISBN 9781649590664
