= Praying of Daniel the Immured =

13th century Old East Slavic text

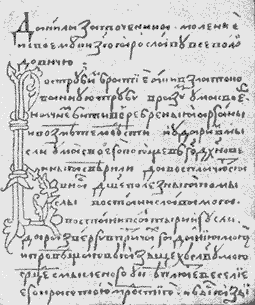
Manuscript from the 16th century collection, Russian State Library

The Prayer of Daniil Zatochnik, also translated as The Supplication of Daniel the Exile or Praying of Daniel the Immured (Russian: Моление Даниила Заточника, romanized: Moleniye Daniila Zatochnika; Old East Slavic: Слово данила заточеника еже восписа ко своемѹ госѹдарю кнѧѕю ꙗрославѹ володимѣровичю, romanized: Slovo danila zatočenika eže vospisa ko svoemu gosudarju knęʒju jaroslavu volodiměrovičju), is an Old East Slavic text created by the Pereyaslavl-born writer Daniil Zatochnik during the 13th century (estimated time 1213–1236).

== Text ==
The work is written in the form of an epistle to Yaroslav Vsevolodovich, Prince of Pereyaslavl and Suzdal. The author appears to be in great need and begs the prince for help, depicting him as a defender of all his subjects. The text combines quotations from the Bible and Old Russian Chronicles with a highly rhythmic language, aphorisms, elements of humour and satire aimed against boyars and clergy; according to Dmitry Likhachov, "Daniel’s deliberate coarseness and buffoonery are in the tradition of the skomorokh (a wandering minstrel-cum-clown)".

== History ==
The origins of both the author and the text is a subject of speculation. Some researches state that The Supplication is based on the 12th-century The Speech or The Oration of Daniel the Exile (Russian: Слово Даниила Заточника, romanized: Slovo Daniila Zatochnika) which was, in turn, addressed to some Prince Yaroslav, "the son of the great tsar Vladimir" (it is suggested that it was one of the sons of Vladimir II Monomakh, although he had no children by the name of Yaroslav). Others believe that The Oration itself is a late edition of The Supplication, yet the questions of literary correlation between the texts remain open.

Daniel is mentioned in the Simeonovskaya Chronicle (late 15th century), year 1387, in connection to some priest who was exiled to the Lake Lacha by Yuri Dolgorukiy "same place as Daniel the Exile"; yet nothing is known about Daniel himself, only that he did not belong to the ruling class and that he had been previously exiled after falling out of favour with the prince. Fyodor Buslaev suggested that he was the son of one of the prince's slaves, Mikhail Tikhomirov concluded that Daniel was an artisan, while Dmitry Likhachov indicated that he belonged to intelligentsia and served as a milostnik (prince's personal servant, a position similar to ministerialis).

Some researchers consider The Oration and The Supplication to be the first examples of Russian opinion journalism, while others name them among the "pioneers of Russian samizdat".

== Links ==
- Original text and translation at the Pushkin House electronic library (in Russian)
- The Prayer of Daniil Zatochnik analysis by Dmitry Likhachov (in Russian)
