= Le Livre de la mutation de fortune =

1403 poem by Christine de Pizan

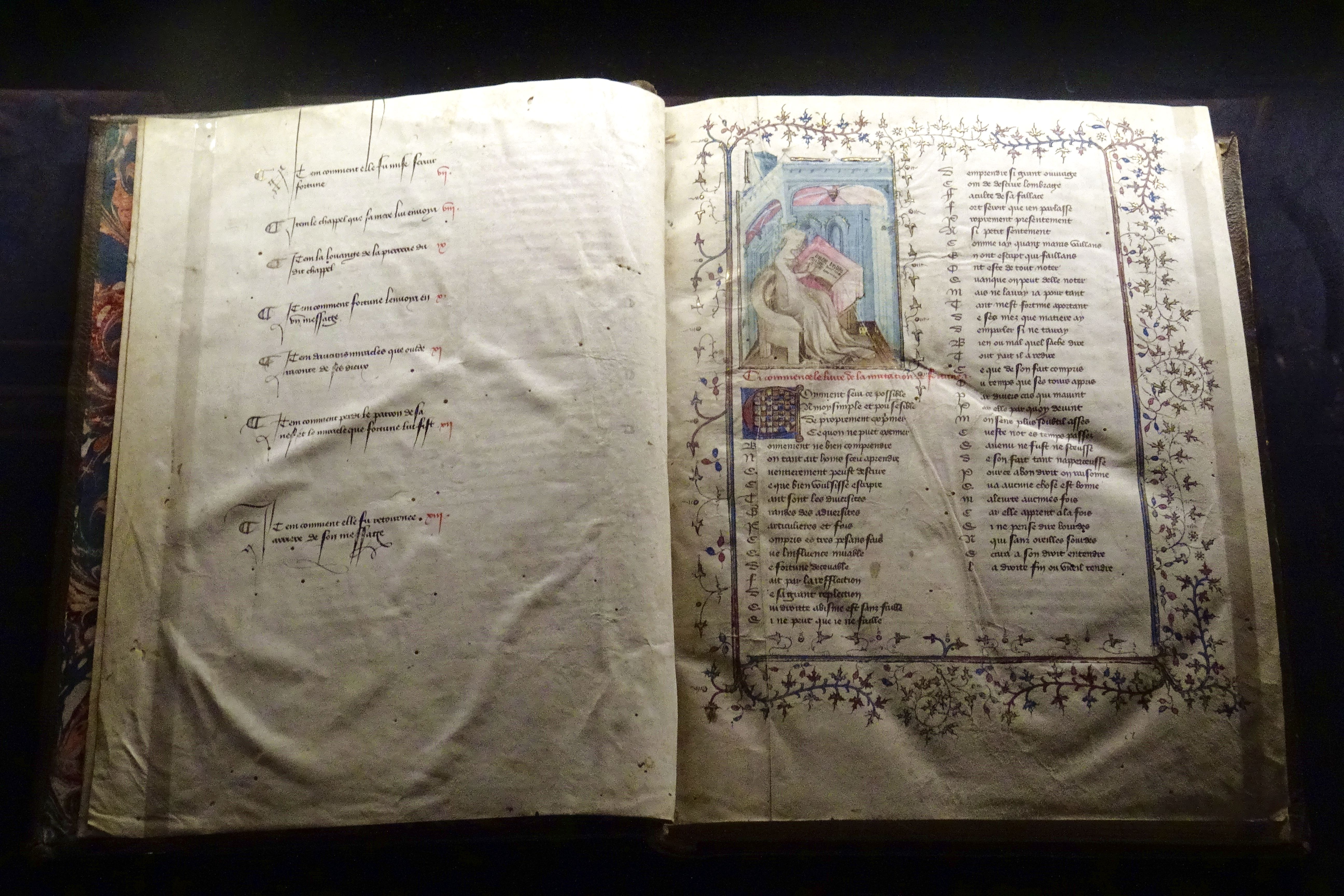
- Author: Christine de Pisan
- Language: French
- Publication date: 1403
- Publication place: France

Le Livre de la mutation de fortune is a 1403 poem by Christine de Pizan. It is a universal history that tells the story of how Fortune has affected events. The frame narrative describes the process of the narrator's "transformation into a man" following the death of their husband, a metaphor used by the author expressing her adoption of the traditionally male social role of a court writer.

== Background ==
Christine de Pizan's husband, Étienne du Castel, died in 1389, leaving her to support her mother and her children as a court writer. Her work emphasizes how learning comforted her after his death.

== Description ==
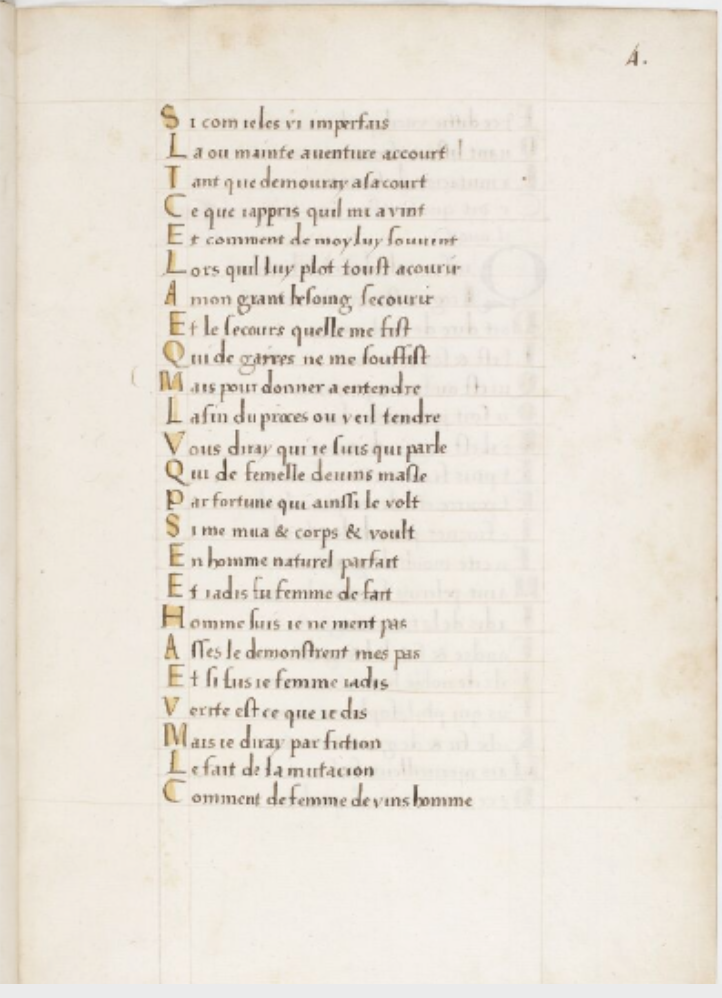
Christine de Pisan - « Livre de la mutation de fortune » Folio 4r, Gallica

Christine de Pizan completed this poem of 23,636 verses in 1403. The narrator of the text explains how they became a man after the death of their husband to become a writer, an occupation considered masculine.

The narrator asserts their male identity, making the text an early account of transgender representation in French medieval literature:

Vous diray qui je suis
Qui de femelle devint masle
Par fortune qu'ainsi le voult
Si me mua et corps et voult
En homme naturel parfaict :
Et jadis fut femme de fait
Homme suis je ne mens pas,

Before addressing the subject of their transformation, the narrator cites two other cases of women being transformed into men: Tiresias and Yplis (the Roman poet Ovid's Iphis).

The author and the narrator share the same name: Christine. The text lists the successive transformations made by the character of Fortune. The narrator indicates that they were transformed into a man by Fortune after their husband died in a shipwreck when they were 25 years old and already a mother. They assert that 13 years later, they are and remain a man. Their poem is therefore an early account of gender transition.

Fortune performed the metamorphosis by touching every part of the narrator's body, until they completely became a man. They also claim to be in every way like their father, resembling him, except for their gender assigned at birth. This transformation of the narrator, contrary to the metamorphosis described in L'Ovide moralisé, takes place from the outside, the appearance of the narrator becoming conform to their inner male soul.

The narrator indicates that they use metaphors in their story, which they think does not exclude the truth.

In the explanatory comments inserted between sections of the text, the writer indicates that the narrator is "a person", and that the text tells how they served Fortune and conducted themself. The narrator indicates that they were assigned female at birth: "fus nee fille, sanz fable".

== Posterity ==
Some of the miniatures in the book inspired works from Robinet Testard and Jean Pichore who worked for Louise of Savoy, among them the face of the goddess or the horizontal wheel.

== See also ==
- Christine de Pizan
