= Christine de Pizan =

Italian-born French author (1364 – c. 1430)

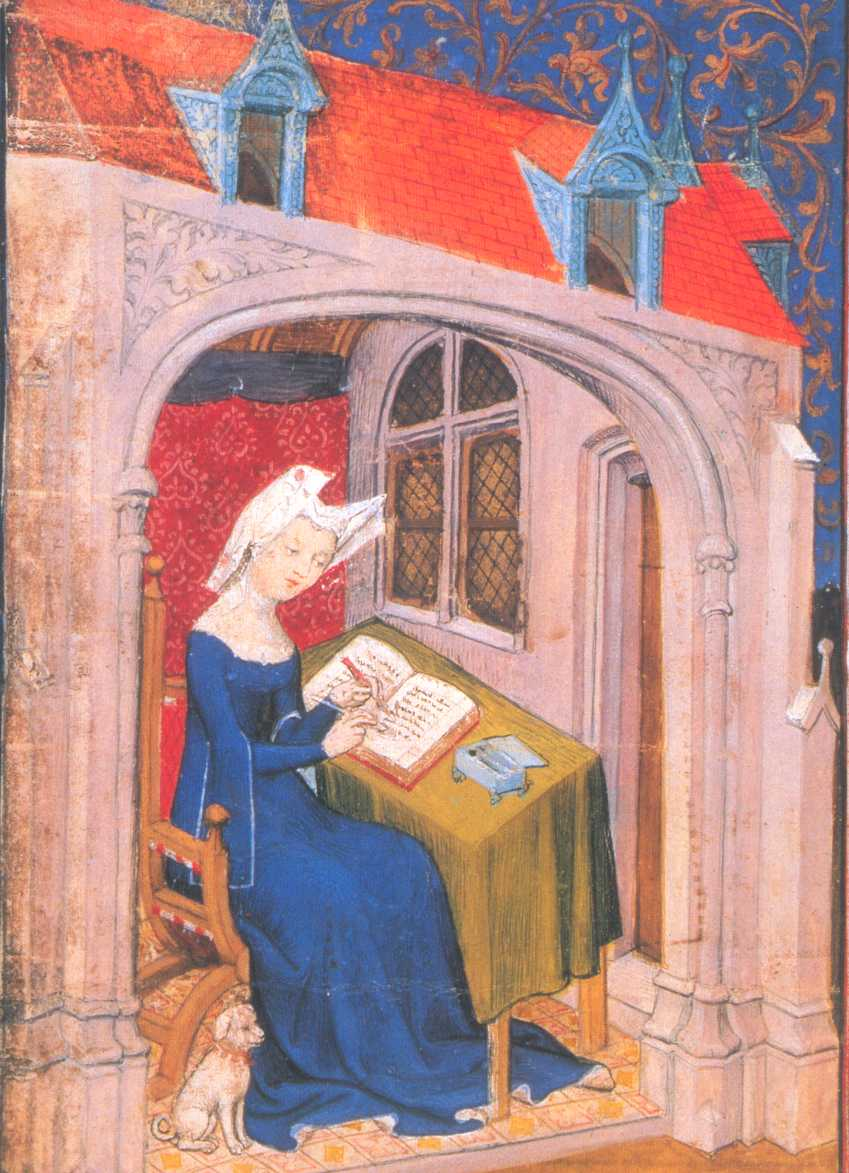
- Christine de Pizan writing a book
- Born: Cristina da Pizzano; September 1364; Venice, Republic of Venice
- Died: c. 1430 (aged 65–66); Poissy, Kingdom of France
- Occupation: Writer
- Spouse: Etienne du Castel (m. 1379; died 1389)
- Children: 3
- Parent: Tommaso di Benvenuto da Pizzano

Christine de Pizan or Pisan (French: [kʁistin də pizɑ̃], Middle French: [krisˈtinə də piˈzã]; born Cristina da Pizzano; September 1364 – c. 1430), was a Venetian-born French court writer for King Charles VI of France and several French royal dukes, in both prose and poetry. She wrote in French, having been raised in France to parents who came from Bologna. Her father was invited to the French court in 1368, when Christine was only four years old, to serve as a doctor and astrologer. He insisted that his daughter learn philosophy, Latin, Italian, French, history, literature, and science, which was very unusual for the time.

Christine became a court writer in medieval France after the death of her husband. Her patrons included dukes Louis I of Orleans, Philip the Bold of Burgundy, and his son John the Fearless. Considered to be some of the earliest feminist writings, her work includes novels, poetry, and biography, and she also penned literary, historical, philosophical, political, and religious reviews and analyses. Her best known works are The Book of the City of Ladies and The Treasure of the City of Ladies, both prose works written when she worked for John the Fearless of Burgundy. Her books of advice to princesses, princes, and knights remained in print until the sixteenth century.

== Life ==
=== Early life and family (1364–1389) ===
The daughter of Tommaso di Benvenuto da Pizzano (or Thomas de Pizan), Christine de Pizan was born in 1364 in the Republic of Venice, Italy. Their family was named for their origins in the village of Pizzano (currently part of the municipality of Monterenzio), southeast of Bologna. Her father worked as a physician, court astrologer and Councillor of the Republic of Venice, later being appointed as court astrologer to King Charles V of France when Christine was a child, in 1368.

In 1379, at the age of fifteen she married the notary and royal secretary Etienne du Castel. A year later, Charles V died, which altered the fortunes of both Thomas and Etienne. Christine had three children; her daughter became a nun at the Dominican convent of Poissy in 1397 as a companion to the King's daughter Marie. Christine's husband died of the plague in 1389, a year after her father had died. On 4 June 1389, in a judgment concerning a lawsuit filed against her by the archbishop of Sens and François Chanteprime, councillors of the King, Christine was called "damoiselle" and "widow of Estienne du Castel".

=== Writing career (1389–1405) ===
After her husband Etienne died, Christine was left to support her mother and her children. When she tried to collect money from her husband's estate, she faced complicated lawsuits regarding the recovery of salaries still owed to her husband. Through this, Christine became a court writer. By 1393, she was writing love ballads, which caught the attention of wealthy patrons within the court. Christine became a prolific writer. Her involvement in the production of her books and her skillful use of patronage in turbulent political times has earned her the title of the first professional woman of letters in Europe.

A miniature of Queen Penthesilea with her army of Amazons coming to the aid of the Trojan army, illustrating L'Épître Othéa a Hector

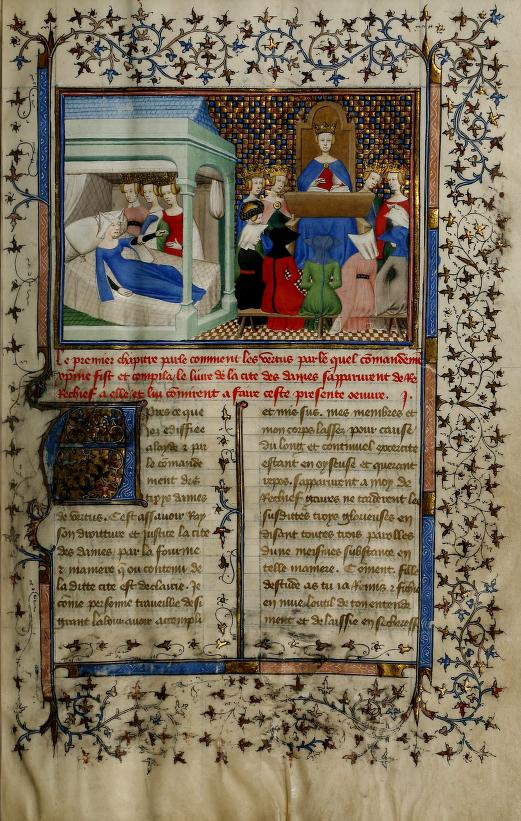
One page of Christine's book Le livre des trois vertus. In the illumination Christine is kept from rest by the Three Virtues.

Although Venetian by birth, Christine expressed a fervent nationalism for France. Affectively and financially she became attached to the French royal family, donating or dedicating her early ballads to its members, including Isabeau of Bavaria, Louis I, Duke of Orléans, and Marie of Berry. Patronage changed in the late Middle Ages. Texts were still produced and circulated as continuous roll manuscripts, but were increasingly replaced by the bound codex. Members of the royal family became patrons of writers by commissioning books. As materials became cheaper a book trade developed, so writers and bookmakers produced books for the French nobility, who could afford to establish their own libraries. Christine thus had no single patron who consistently supported her financially and became associated with the royal court and the different factions of the royal family – the Burgundy, Orleans and Berry – each having their own respective courts. Throughout her career Christine undertook concurrent paid projects for individual patrons and subsequently published these works for dissemination among the nobility of France.

France was ruled by Charles VI who since 1392 experienced a series of mental breakdowns, causing a crisis of leadership for the French monarchy. He was often absent from court and could eventually only make decisions with the approval of a royal council. Queen Isabeau was nominally in charge of governance when her husband was absent from court but could not extinguish the quarrel between members of the royal family. In the past, Blanche of Castile had played a central role in the stability of the royal court and had acted as regent of France. Christine published a series of works on the virtues of women, referencing Queen Blanche and dedicating them to Queen Isabeau. In 1402 she described Queen Isabeau as "High, excellent crowned Queen of France, very redoubtable princess, powerful lady, born at a lucky hour".

Christine believed that France had been founded by the descendants of the Trojans and that its governance by the royal family adhered to the Aristotelian ideal. In 1400 Christine published L'Épistre de Othéa a Hector (Letter of Othea to Hector). When first published, the book was dedicated to Louis of Orléans, the brother of Charles VI, who was at court seen as potential regent of France. In L'Épistre de Othéa a Hector Hector of Troy is tutored in statecraft and the political virtues by the goddess of wisdom Othéa. Christine produced richly illustrated luxury editions of L'Épistre de Othéa a Hector in 1400. Between 1408 and 1415 Christine produced further editions of the book. Throughout her career she produced rededicated editions of the book with customised prologues for patrons, including an edition for Philip the Bold in 1403, and editions for Jean of Berry and Henry IV of England in 1404. She employed several of the best manuscript illuminators of Paris; for the presentation copy of L'Épistre de Othéa a Hector made for Louis of Orléans, she employed (and may have discovered) the so-called Master of the Epître d'Othéa.

In 1402, Christine became involved in a renowned literary controversy, the "Querelle du Roman de la Rose". Christine questioned the literary merits of Jean de Meun's popular Romance of the Rose, which satirizes the conventions of courtly love while critically depicting women as nothing more than seducers. In the midst of the Hundred Years' War between French and English kings, Christine wrote the dream allegory Le Chemin de long estude in 1403. Writing in the first-person, she and the Cumaean Sibyl travel together and witness a debate on the state of the world between the four allegories – Wealth, Nobility, Chivalry and Wisdom. Christine suggests that justice could be brought to earth by a single monarch who had the necessary qualities.

In 1404, Christine chronicled the life of Charles V, portraying him as the ideal king and political leader, in Le Livre des fais et bonnes meurs du sage roy Charles V. The chronicle had been commissioned by Philip the Bold of Burgundy and in the chronicle, Christine passed judgment on the state of the royal court. When praising the efforts of Charles V in studying Latin, Christine lamented that her contemporaries had to resort to strangers to read the law to them. Before the book was completed, Philip the Bold died, and Christine offered the book to Jean, Duke of Berry in 1405 in an attempt to find a new patron. She was paid 100 livres for the book by Philip the Bold's successor John the Fearless in 1406 and would receive payments from his court for books until 1412.

In 1405, Christine published Le Livre de la cité des dames (The Book of the City of Ladies) and Le Livre des trois vertus (Book of Three Virtues, known as The Treasure of the City of Ladies). In Le Livre de la cité des dames Christine presented intellectual and royal female leaders, such as Queen Zenobia. Christine dedicated Le Livre des trois vertus to the dauphine Margaret of Nevers, advising the young princess on what she had to learn. As Queen Isabeau's oldest son Louis of Guyenne came of age Christine addressed three works to him with the intention of promoting wise and effective government. The earliest of the three works has been lost. In Livre du Corps de policie (The Book of the Body Politic), published in 1407 and dedicated to the dauphin, Christine set out a political treatise which analysed and described the customs and governments of late medieval European societies. Christine favoured hereditary monarchies, arguing in reference to Italian city-states that were governed by princes or trade guilds, that "such governance is not profitable at all for the common good". Christine also devoted several chapters to the duties of a king as a military leader and she described in detail the role of the military class in society.

=== Civil war (1405–1430) ===
In the beginning of 1405, France was on the verge of a full-scale civil war. In 1407 John I of Burgundy, also known as John the Fearless, plunged France into a crisis when he ordered the assassination of Louis of Orléans. The Duke of Burgundy fled Paris when his complicity in the assassination became known, but was appointed regent of France on behalf of Charles VI in late 1408 after his military victory in the Battle of Othee. It is not certain who commissioned Christine to write a treatise on military warfare, but in 1410 Christine published the manual on chivalry, entitled Livre des fais d'armes et de chevalerie (The Book of Feats of Arms and of Chivalry). In early 1411, Christine was paid 200 livres from the royal treasury for the book. In the preface Christine explained that she published the manual in French so that it could be read by practitioners of war not well versed in Latin. The book opened with a discussion of the just war theory advanced by Honoré Bonet. Christine also referenced classical writers on military warfare, such as Vegetius, Frontinus and Valerius Maximus. Christine discussed contemporary matters relating to what she termed the Laws of War, such as capital punishment, the payment of troops, as well as the treatment of noncombatants and prisoners of war. Christine opposed trial by combat, but articulated the medieval belief that God is the lord and governor of battle and that wars are the proper execution of justice. Nevertheless, she acknowledged that in a war "many great wrongs, extortions, and grievous deeds are committed, as well as raping, killings, forced executions, and arsons". Christine limited the right to wage war to sovereign kings because as head of states they were responsible for the welfare of their subjects. In 1411 the royal court published an edict prohibiting nobles from raising an army.

After civil war had broken out in France, Christine in 1413 offered guidance to the young dauphin on how to govern well, publishing Livre de la paix (The Book of Peace). Livre de la paix was to be Christine's last major work and contained detailed formulations of her thoughts on good governance. The period was marked by bouts of civil war and failed attempts to bring John the Fearless to justice for assassinating his cousin. Christine addressed Louis of Guyenne directly, encouraging him to continue the quest for peace in France. She argued that "Every kingdom divided in itself will be made desolate, and every city and house divided against itself will not stand". Christine was acquainted with William of Tignonville, an ambassador to the royal court, and referenced Tignonville's speeches on the Armagnac–Burgundian Civil War. Christine drew a utopian vision of a just ruler, who could take advice from those older or wiser. In arguing that peace and justice were possible on earth as well as in heaven, Christine was influenced by Dante, whom she had referenced in Le Chemin de long estude. Christine encouraged the dauphin to deserve respect, by administering justice promptly and living by worthy example. Christine urged young princes to make themselves available to their subjects, avoid anger and cruelty, to act liberally, mercifully and truthfully. Christine's interpretation of the virtuous Christian prince built on the advice to rulers by St Benedict, Peter Abelard and Cicero.

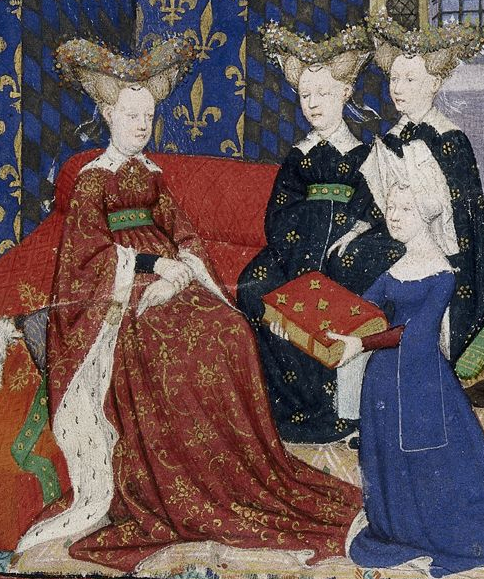
Christine de Pizan presents her book to Isabeau of Bavaria, Queen of France.

In 1414, Christine presented Queen Isabeau with a lavishly decorated collection of her works (now known as The Book of the Queen or British Library Harley MS 4431). The bound book contained 30 of Christine's writings and 130 miniatures. It was illustrated by the Master of the Cité des dames, and came to serve as a template for later medieval illustrations of her works. She had been asked by the queen to produce the book. The work is noted for its quality miniature illuminations; Christine herself and her past royal patrons are depicted. As a mark of ownership and authorship the opening frontispiece depicts Queen Isabeau being presented with the book by Christine.

In 1418, Christine published a consolation for women who had lost family members in the Battle of Agincourt under the title Epistre de la prison de vie Humaine (Letter Concerning the Prison of Human Life). In it, Christine did not express any optimism or hope that peace could be found on earth; instead, she expressed the view that the soul was trapped in the body and imprisoned in hell. The previous year she had presented the Epistre de la prison de vie Humaine to Marie of Berry, the administrator of the Duchy of Bourbon whose husband was held in English captivity.

Historians assume that Christine spent the last ten years of her life in the Dominican convent of Poissy because of the civil war and the occupation of Paris by the English. Away from the royal court her literary activity ceased. However, in 1429, after Joan of Arc's military victory over the English, Christine published the poem Ditié de Jehanne d'Arc (The Tale of Joan of Arc). Published just a few days after the coronation of Charles VII, Christine expressed renewed optimism. She cast Joan as the fulfilment of prophecies by Merlin, the Cumaean Sibyl and Saint Bede, helping Charles VII to fulfil the predictions of Charlemagne.

Christine is believed to have died in 1430, before Joan was tried and executed by the English. After her death the political crisis in France was resolved when Queen Isabeau's only surviving son Charles VII and John the Fearless' successor as Duke of Burgundy, Philip the Good, signed the Peace of Arras in 1435.

== Works ==
Detail of a miniature of ladies watching knights jousting, illustrating 'Le Duc des vrais amants', from a collection of works presented in 1414 by Christine to Isabeau of Bavaria.

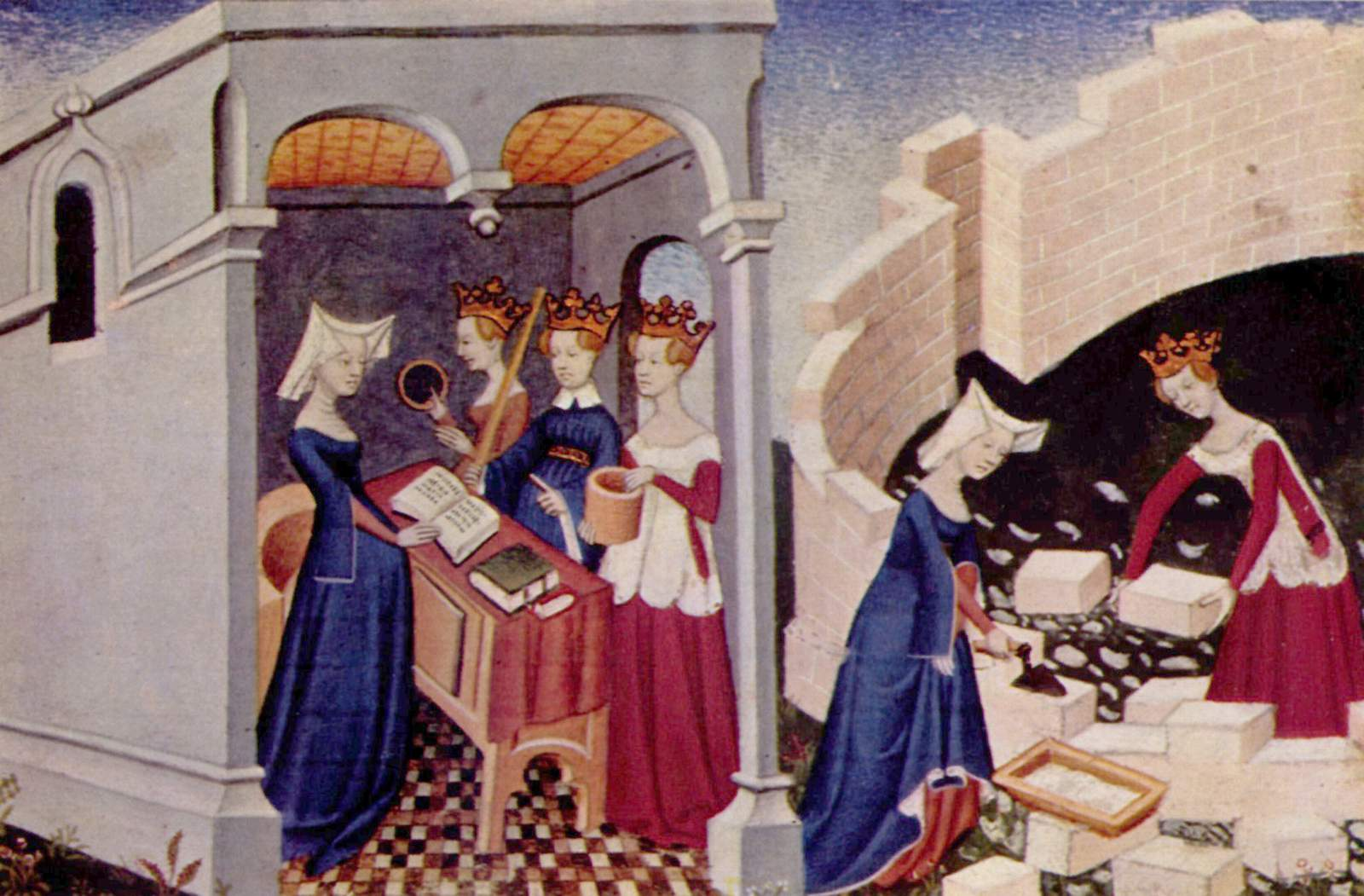
Illumination from The Book of the City of Ladies by the Master of the Cité des dames. Christine is shown before the personifications of Rectitude, Reason, and Justice in her study, and working alongside Justice to build the 'Cité des dames'.

Christine produced a large number of vernacular works, in both prose and verse. Her works include political treatises, mirrors for princes, epistles, and poetry. Christine's book Le Dit de la Rose (The Tale of the Rose) was published in 1402 as a direct attack on Jean de Meun's extremely popular book Romance of the Rose which was a continuation of the version by Guillaume de Lorris and characterised women as seducers. Christine claimed that Meun's views were misogynistic, vulgar, immoral, and slanderous to women. Christine sparked a debate over the literary merits of the work when she confronted the royal secretary, Jean de Montreuil, who had written a short treatise praising the work. The debate continued between Christine and two other male royal secretaries who defended Jean in a heated exchange. At the height of the exchange Christine published Querelle du Roman de la Rose (Letters on the Debate of the Rose). In this particular apologetic response, Christine belittles her own writing style, employing a rhetorical strategy by writing against the grain of her meaning, also known as antiphrasis.

By 1405, Christine had completed her most famous literary works, The Book of the City of Ladies (Le Livre de la cité des dames) and The Treasure of the City of Ladies (Le Livre des trois vertus). The first of these shows the importance of women's past contributions to society, and the second strives to teach women of all estates how to cultivate useful qualities.

In The Book of the City of Ladies Christine created a symbolic city in which women are appreciated and defended. She constructed three allegorical figures – Reason, Justice, and Rectitude – in the common pattern of literature in that era when many books and poetry used stock allegorical figures to express ideas or emotions. She enters into a dialogue, a movement between question and answer, with these allegorical figures that is from a completely female perspective. Together, they create a forum to speak on issues of consequence to all women. Only female voices, examples and opinions provide evidence within this text. Through Lady Reason in particular Christine argues that stereotypes of women can be sustained only if women are prevented from entering into the conversation.

In City of Ladies Christine deliberated on the debate of whether the virtues of men and women differ, a frequently debated topic in late medieval Europe, particularly in the context of Aristotelian virtue ethics and his views on women. Christine repeatedly used the theological argument that men and women are created in God's image and both have souls capable of embracing God's goodness. Among the inhabitants of the City of Ladies are female saints, women from the Old Testament and virtuous women from the pagan antiquity as portrayed by Giovanni Boccaccio. Within her allegorical city of illustrious ladies, she reimagines the mythological figure, Medusa. Christine de Pizan's Medusa, in stark contrast to the typical portrayal in classical texts, is not a monstrous and deadly creature, but a woman deserving of safety from male harm. De Pizan is the first to provide a feminist revisionist perspective of the ancient myth.

In The Treasure of the City of Ladies Christine addressed the "community" of women with the stated objective of instructing them on the means of achieving virtue. She took the position that all women were capable of humility, diligence and moral rectitude, and that duly educated women could become worthy residents of the imaginary City of Ladies. Drawing on her own life, Christine advised women on how to navigate the perils of early 15th-century French society. She was a strong advocate of education for women, having said "If it were customary to send little girls to school and to teach them the same subjects as are taught boys, they would learn just as fully and would understand the subtleties of all arts and sciences". With reference to Augustine of Hippo and other saints Christine offered advice on how the noble lady could achieve the love of God. Christine speaks through the allegorical figures of God's daughters – Reason, Rectitude and Justice – who represent the Three Virtues most important to women's success. Through secular examples of these three virtues, Christine urged women to discover meaning and achieve worthy acts in their lives. Christine argued that women's success depends on their ability to manage and mediate by speaking and writing effectively.

Christine specifically sought out other women to collaborate in the creation of her work. She makes special mention of a manuscript illustrator we know only as Anastasia, whom she described as the most talented of her day.

== Legacy ==
=== Early French influence ===
Queen Fredegund addressing her troops holding her baby. Miniature from a 1475 Dutch translation of The Book of the City of Ladies. Published under the title De Stede der Vrouwen (The Praise of Women).

Christine published 41 known pieces of poetry and prose in her lifetime and she gained fame across Europe as the first professional woman writer. She achieved such credibility that royalty commissioned her prose and contemporary intellectuals kept copies of her works in their libraries.

After her death in 1430, Christine's influence was acknowledged by a variety of authors and her writings remained popular. While de Pizan's mixture of classical philosophy and humanistic ideals was in line with the style of other popular authors at the time, her outspoken defence of women was an anomaly. In her works she vindicated women against popular misogynist texts, such as Ovid's Art of Love, Jean de Meun's Romance of the Rose and Matheolus's Lamentations. Her book Le Livre de la cité des dames remained in print. Christine's Le Livre des trois vertus (The Treasure of the City of Ladies) became an important reference point for royal women in the 15th and 16th centuries; French editions were still being printed in 1536. Anne of France, who acted as regent of France, used it as a basis for her 1504 book of Enseignemens, written for her daughter Suzanne Duchess of Bourbon, who as agnatic heir to the Bourbon lands became co-regent. Christine's advice to princesses was translated and circulated as manuscripts or printed books among the royal families of France and Portugal. The City of Ladies was acknowledged and referenced by 16th century French women writers, including Anne de Beaujeu, Gabrielle de Bourbon, Marguerite de Navarre and Georgette de Montenay.

Christine's political writings received some attention too. Livre de la paix was referenced by the humanist Gabriel Naudé and Christine was given large entries in encyclopedias by Denis Diderot, Louis Moréri and Prosper Marchand. In 1470 Jean V de Bueil reproduced Christine's detailed accounts of the armies and material needed to defend a castle or town against a siege in Le Jouvence. Livre des fais d'armes et de chevalerie was published in its entirety by the book printer Antoine Vérard in 1488, but Vérard claimed that it was his translation of Vegetius. Philippe Le Noir authored an abridged version of Christine's book in 1527 under the title L'Arbre des Batailles et fleur de chevalerie (The tree of battles and flower of chivalry).

=== Outside France ===
Page 1 of The Book of Feats of Arms and of Chivalry. Translated into English and printed in 1489 by William Caxton.

A Dutch edition of Le Livre de la cité des dames exists from the 15th century. In 1521 The Book of the City of Ladies was published in English. Livre des fais d'armes et de chevalerie was translated into English by William Caxton for Henry VII in 1489 and was published under the title The Book of Feats of Arms and of Chivalry as print one year later, attributing Christine as author. English editions of The Book of the City of Ladies and Livre du corps de policie (The Book of the Body Politic) were printed in 1521 without referencing Christine as the author. Elizabeth I had in her court library copies of The Book of the City of Ladies, L'Épistre de Othéa a Hector (Letter of Othea to Hector) and The Book of Feats of Arms and of Chivalry. Among the possessions of the English queen were tapestries with scenes from the City of Ladies.

=== Nineteenth to twenty-first centuries ===
In the early nineteenth century Raimond Thomassy published an overview of Christine's political writings and noted that modern editions of these writings were not published and that as a political theorist Christine was descending into obscurity. Similarly, Mathilde Laigle and Marie-Josephe Pinet are credited with reviving the work of de Pizan in the early twentieth century, as a writer who had been forgotten in France but noted elsewhere. Laigle noticed for instance that Spanish writers had borrowed extensively from de Pizan's work, even though it had not been translated into that language.

Her activism has also drawn the fascination of modern feminists. Simone de Beauvoir wrote in 1949 that Épître au Dieu d'Amour was "the first time we see a woman take up her pen in defence of her sex". Beginning in the 1950s, scholarly work by Suzanne Solente further bolstered Christine's reputation.

Judy Chicago's 1979 artwork The Dinner Party features a place setting for Christine de Pizan. In the 1980s Sandra Hindman published a study of the political events referenced in the illuminations of Christine's published works. In recent decades, Christine's work has continued to grow in reputation by the efforts of scholars such as Charity Cannon Willard and Earl Jeffrey Richards.

In the opening ceremony of the 2024 Summer Olympics in Paris, Christine was one of the 10 pioneering female contributors to French history honoured by gold-coloured statues which rose from giant pedestals along the river Seine.

== List of works ==
- Enseignements moraux (1395) ("Moral Teachings")
- L'Épistre au Dieu d'amours (1399) ("Epistle to the God of Love")
- L'Épistre de Othéa a Hector (1399–1400) ("Epistle of Othéa to Hector")"
- Dit de la Rose (1402) ("Tale of the Rose")
- Cent Ballades d'Amant et de Dame, Virelays, Rondeaux (1402) ("One Hundred Ballads, Virelays, and Rondeaus of Lover and Lady")
- Le Chemin de long estude (1403) ("Book of the Long Study")
- Livre de la mutation de fortune (1403) ("Book of Fortune's Transformation")
- La Pastoure (1403) ("The Pasture")
- Le Livre des fais et bonnes meurs du sage roy Charles V (1404) ("The Book of the Deeds and Good Morals of the Wise King Charles V")
- Le Livre de la cité des dames (1405) ("Book of the City of the Ladies")
- Le Livre des trois vertus (1405) ("Book of the Three Virtues", known in English as "Treasure of the City of the Ladies")
- L'Avision de Christine (1405) ("The Vision of Christine")
- Livre du corps de policie (1407) ("Book of the Body Politic")
- Livre des fais d'armes et de chevalerie (1410) ("Book of the Deeds of Arms and Chivalry", or "Treatise on Fortifications")
- Livre de paix (1413) ("Book of Peace")
- Epistre de la prison de vie humaine (1418) ("Epistle on the Prison of Human Life")
- Les sept psaumes allégorisés ("The Seven Psalms, Allegorized")
- Ditié de Jehanne d'Arc (1429) ("The Tale of Joan of Arc")

== See also ==
- Antoine Vérard
- List of French-language poets
- Vernacular literature
- Women's history

== Bibliography ==
- Adams, Tracy (2014), Christine de Pizan and the Fight for France, Penn State Press, ISBN 9780271066332.
- Adams, Tracy (1 June 2017), "Christine de Pizan", French Studies, 71 (3): 388–400, doi:10.1093/fs/knx129, ISSN 0016-1128.
- Ainonen, Tuija (31 March 2017), "Internship in Ancient, Medieval and Early Modern Manuscripts", Medieval Manuscripts Blog, British Library.
- Allen, Prudence (2005), The Concept of Woman: The Early Humanist Reformation, 1250–1500, Part 2, Wm. B. Eerdmans Publishing, ISBN 978-0-8028-3347-1.
- Altmann, Barbara K.; McGrady, Deborah L. (2003), Christine de Pizan: A Casebook, Routledge, ISBN 978-0-415-93909-6.
- Bejczy, Istvan P. (2011), "Does Virtue Recognise Gender? Christine de Pizan's City of Ladies in the Light of Scholastic Debate", in Green, Karen; Mews, Constant (eds.), Virtue Ethics for Women 1250–1500, Springer, pp. 1–12, ISBN 9789400705296.
- Biggs, Sarah J (27 June 2013), "Christine de Pizan and the Book of the Queen", Medieval Manuscripts Blog, British Library.
- Bourgault, S.; Kingston, R. (2018), "Introduction", Christine de Pizan: The Book of the City of Ladies, Hackett, pp. ix–xliv, ISBN 978-1624667305.
- Brown-Grant, Rosalind (1999), Introduction, The Book of the City of Ladies, by Christine de Pizan, translated by Rosalind Brown-Grant, London: Penguin Books.
- Campbell, Karlyn K. (2003), Three Tall Women: Radical Challenges to Criticism, Pedagogy, and Theory, The Carroll C. Arnold Distinguished Lecture National Communication Association, November 2001, Boston: Pearson Education
- Chicago, Judy (1979), "Place Settings", Elizabeth A. Sackler Center for Feminist Art, Brooklyn Museum
- Chicago, Judy; et al. (1979), "Christine de Pisan", Elizabeth A. Sackler Center for Feminist Art, Brooklyn Museum
- Christine de Pizan (2019), The Epistle of the Prison of Human Life: With an Epistle to the Queen of France and Lament on the Evils of the Civil War, Routledge, ISBN 978-0-429-64734-5
- Famiglietti, R.C. (2015), Audouin Chauveron, vol. 2.
- Goodman, Jennifer R. (1998), Chivalry and Exploration, 1298–1630, Woodbridge: Boydell & Brewer, ISBN 978-0-85115-700-9.
- Green, Karen (2010), Preface – The Book of Peace, Penn State Press, ISBN 9780271045573.
- Iacobone, Damiano (2021), "Christine de Pizan and Her Treatise on Fortifications (1410)", in Magnaghi-Delfino, P.; Mele, G.; Norando, T. (eds.), Faces of Geometry, Springer, pp. 129–137, doi:10.1007/978-3-030-63702-6_10.
- Kelly, F. Douglas (1971), "Reflections on the Role of Christine de Pisan as a Feminist Writer", SubStance, 1 (2), University of Wisconsin Press: 63–71, doi:10.2307/3684605, ISSN 0049-2426, JSTOR 3684605.
- Krueger, Roberta (1998), "Christine's Anxious Lessons: Gender, Morality, and the Social Order from the Enseignemens to the Avision", in Desmond, Marilynn (ed.), Christine de Pizan and the Categories of Difference, Medieval Cultures, vol. 14, University of Minnesota Press, pp. 16–40, ISBN 978-0-8166-3081-3.
- Langdon Forhan, Kate (2017), The Political Theory of Christine de Pizan, Taylor & Francis, ISBN 9781351883948.
- Lloyd, Jean (7 July 2006), "Christine de Pizan", Prof. Pavlac's Women's History Site, King's College.
- McGrady, Deborah (1998), "What Is a Patron? Benefactors and Authorship in Harley 4431, Christine de Pizan's Collected Works", in Desmond, Marilynn (ed.), Christine de Pizan and the Categories of Difference, University of Minnesota Press, pp. 195–214, ISBN 978-0-8166-3081-3.
- Meiss, Millard (1974). French Painting in the Time of Jean de Berry. The Limbourgs and Their Contemporaries. Thames and Hudson. ISBN 0500232016..
- Quilligan, Maureen (1991), The Allegory of Female Authority: Christine de Pizan's Cité des Dames, New York: Cornell University Press.
- Redfern, Jenny (1995), "Christine de Pisan and The Treasure of the City of Ladies: A Medieval Rhetorician and Her Rhetoric", in Lunsford, Andrea A (ed.), Reclaiming Rhetorica: Women and in the Rhetorical Tradition, Pittsburgh: University of Pittsburgh Press, ISBN 9780822971658.
- Ripley, Doré (2019), "Christine de Pizan: An Illuminated Voice", Scribblings.
- Schaus, Margaret C. (2006), Women and Gender in Medieval Europe: An Encyclopedia, Routledge, ISBN 9781135459604.
- Schneir, Miriam (1994), Feminism: The Essential Historical Writings, Vintage Books, ISBN 978-0-679-75381-0.
- Villela-Petit, Inès (2021). "Christine sans Christine". Studi Francesi. Rivista quadrimestrale fondata da Franco Simone (in French). 195 (LXV–III): 515–534.
- Willard, Charity C. (1984), Christine de Pizan: Her Life and Works, New York: Persea Books.
- Willard, Charity Cannon; Willard, Sumner (2010), "Preface", Book of Deeds of Arms and of Chivalry, Penn State Press, ISBN 978-0-271-04305-0.
- Whetham, David (2009), Just Wars and Moral Victories: Surprise, Deception and the Normative Framework of European War in the Later Middle Ages, Brill, ISBN 9789004171534.
- Wolfthal, Diane (1998), ""Douleur sur toutes autres": Revisualizing the Rape Script in the Epistre Othea and the Cité des dames", in Marilynn Desmond (ed.), Christine de Pizan and the Categories of Difference, University of Minnesota Press, pp. 41–70, ISBN 978-0-8166-3081-3
