= Millard Meiss =

American art historian (1904–1975)

Millard Lazare Meiss (March 25, 1904 – June 12, 1975) was an American art historian, one of whose specialties was Gothic architecture. Meiss worked as an art history professor at Columbia University from 1934 to 1953. After teaching at Columbia, he became a professor at Harvard until 1958, when he joined the Institute for Advanced Study, in Princeton, N.J. Meiss has edited several leading art journals and has also written articles and books on medieval and Renaissance painting. Among his many important contributions are Italian style in Catalonia and a fourteenth century Catalan workshop (1941), Painting in Florence and Siena after the Black Death (1951) and French Painting in the Time of Jean de Berry (3 vol., 1967–74). Other notable works include: Andrea Mantegna as Illuminator (1957), Giotto and Assisi (1960), The Painting of the Life of St. Francis in Assisi (with Leonetto Tintori, 1962), and The Great Age of Fresco (1970). Meiss also organized the first meeting in the United States of the Congress of the International Committee of the History of Art, and was elected the organization's president. He was elected to the American Academy of Arts and Sciences in 1954 and the American Philosophical Society in 1963. In 1966, he assisted in Florence with restoration efforts following the 1966 Flood of the Arno River, despite being in ill health. He gave the 1970 Aspects of Art Lecture.

Meiss was married to his wife Miggi (short for Margaret), a clinical psychologist. They had a daughter, Elinor Sider, a psychiatrist and psychoanalyst. He died in June 1975 at age 71.

== Additional articles and reviews ==
JSTOR 41430296 JSTOR 878108 JSTOR 557001 JSTOR 2858466
