= Paula Valeria =

Roman woman married to Decimus Brutus

Paula Valeria (fl. 50s–40s BCE), sometimes as Valeria Paulla or Polla, (Note: Usually taken as the Polla named in Ad familiares 11.8.1 (360.1): Eo tempore Polla tua misit, ut ad te, si quid vellem, darem litterarum, cum, quid scriberem, non habebam.) was the sister of a Triarius who was most likely a son of Gaius Valerius Triarius, and became the wife of one of Julius Caesar's assassins, Decimus Junius Brutus Albinus, who was her second husband. She is remarked upon for initiating a precipitous divorce from her first husband in order to marry Brutus, for whom no other wife is known.

== Family ==
A passage in a letter from Caelius Rufus to Cicero identifies Paula Valeria as the sister of a Triarius. Two Valerii Triarii, Publius and Gaius, were active around this time. They are often identified as brothers, both sons of Gaius Valerius Triarius, and were probably around the same age as Decimus Brutus.

However, Caelius uses the singular form to refer to Paula's sibling, which Bondurant in his biography of Decimus views as an argument against automatically regarding the two as brothers, without rejecting that they were. Purser made the case for Publius as the brother, but Gaius was a friend of Cicero and appears as an interlocutor in his treatise De finibus. Upon the death of Gaius sometime before April 46 BCE, Cicero even became legal guardian of his children. These personal connections make it more likely that Caelius thought news touching on this Triarius would be of interest to Cicero.

== Divorce ==
In April or May of 50 BCE, when Caelius Rufus wrote to Cicero during his term as proconsul in Cilicia, he shared a tidbit of Roman gossip:

Paula Valeria, Triarius' sister, has divorced her husband for no reason the day he was due to get back from his province. She is to marry D. Brutus. … There have been a good many extraordinary incidents (incredibilia) of this sort during your absence which I have not yet reported.

Decimus Brutus is thought to have returned to Rome from his military service under Caesar in Gaul and to have been serving as quaestor in 50. The ellipsis in the above passage marks a textual crux for which Shackleton Bailey offered multiple possible readings to do with the husband's return. Watt proposed that the corrupt phrase meant the husband, whose name is unknown, hadn't returned on the date expected and Caelius was relishing Paula's needless haste in the matter.

The passage is notable as an example of the legal capacity of Roman women to initiate divorce, though Paula Valeria's timing evidently raised eyebrows. Incredibilia indicates that at least some circumstances surrounding the divorce were received as surprising. Accusations of infidelity, inferred from the limited sources by Syme in his recurring suggestion that Brutus had been "paying court" to Paula, were at times made by husbands who had left their wives for an extended period while serving in the provinces; if a man enjoyed a successful term in office, he might be seeking a more politically advantageous marriage upon return. Wives might also accuse their absent husbands of infidelity while abroad — a charge that could even become fodder in a trial involving administrative improprieties such as extortion or treason. Paula appears not to have resorted to such an allegation; the scandal of suing for divorce in this case is that it was sine causa, without cause.

The cultural milieu of the observing scholar may affect the interpretation: in 1912, the French classicist René Pichon admired Caelius's tone of "amiable insouciance", which he took to represent casual acceptance of divorce as a marker of the relative freedom of Roman women.

== Politics ==
In the political environment of the 50s and 40s BCE in Rome, marriages among the elite were often alliances to consolidate family wealth, prestige, and influence. The liaison of a woman from the Valerii Triarii family with Decimus Brutus thus raises questions. Political evidence for the Triarii points toward senatorial and optimate affinities at a time when civil war had come to seem inevitable, but Decimus was still staunchly in Caesar's camp in the year 50. When the civil war did break out, Decimus remained in military support of Caesar while his new brother-in-law Gaius allied with Pompeius.

Decimus can hardly have been unaware of the political dimensions even before the war, and it may be that he was simply exploring his options and expanding his network of connections. Also possible is that the Triarii in effect were attempting to competitively recruit Decimus because of his closeness to Caesar, or to show that support for Caesar could be peeled away. That Decimus eventually took part in the assassination plot may suggest an ideological fault line running contrary to the opportunities and advantages he gained through his career under Caesar. In his brief 1934 study of political alliances expressed through marriage from this period, Franklin Potter saw Paula as playing a pivotal role in luring Decimus away from Caesar.

== Marriage ==
Seven years later, Paula Valeria remained committed to Decimus Brutus. In writing to Decimus toward the end of January 43 BCE, when he was under siege by Marcus Antonius, Cicero lets him know that "Polla" (Note: An alternative spelling for Paula fashionable in the late Republic, as was the variant Clodia for Claudia.) had been making inquiry because no news had been getting through. Decimus was killed that April. The marriage with Paula had lasted to the end of his life, and no earlier wife is known for him. (Note: In a 1987 article featuring a short list of men of consular rank whose marriages pose challenges of sociology or prosopography, Syme includes Decimus Brutus as "allegedly divorced by his wife Valeria Paulla" with no further discussion, footnote, or explanation of "allegedly". In his only other discussion of Decimus's marriage in this article, Syme merely restates, "In the course of the year 50 Decimus was to acquire Paulla Valeria — who had divorced her husband, as he was apprised when coming back from a province," citing the standard passage from Caelius's letter to Cicero. Suspicion of editorial lapse may obtrude.)

In proactively seeking Cicero's aid for her husband, Paula was among the upper-class women of the late Roman Republic who acted as "supporters and intermediaries" for their husbands or sons when they were away from Rome during the civil wars of the 40s. Both of the Triarii who are likely to have been the referenced brother died in the war, removing the element of political utility from the marriage. Maria Dettenhofer allowed for the possibility that it was the kind of marriage arranged traditionally among elite families, in which affection could still play a role, and not necessarily politically motivated — it may have been a love match from its impetuous beginning.

== Bibliography ==
- Bondurant, Bernard Camillus (1907). Decimus Junius Brutus Albinus: A Historical Study. University of Chicago Press.
- Dettenhofer, Maria H. (1992). Perdita Iuventus: Zwischen den Generationen von Caesar und Augutus. Vestigia: Beiträge zur Alten Geschichte (in German). Vol. 44. C. H. Beck.
- Jeppesen-Wigelsworth, Alison (2013). "Amici and Coniuges in Cicero's Letters : Atticus and Terentia". Latomus. 72 (2): 350–365. JSTOR 23800389.
- Marshall, Anthony J. (1975). "Roman Women and the Provinces". Ancient Society. 6: 109–127. JSTOR 44080083.
- Parkin, Tim G. (1994). "Review of Marriage, Divorce and Children in Ancient Rome; The Roman Family; The Roman Household: A Sourcebook; Roman Marriage: Iusti Coniuges from the Time of Cicero to the Time of Ulpian; Die Ehegesetze Des Augustus: Eine Untersuchung Im Rahmen Der Gesellschaftspolitik Des Princeps; Discovering the Roman Family: Studies in Roman Social History; The Family in Italy from Antiquity to the Present; Parenté et Stratégies Familiales dans l'Antiquité Romaine; War, Women and Children in Ancient Rome by B. Rawson et al.". Journal of Roman Studies. 84: 178–185. JSTOR 300876.
- Pichon, René (1912). "Les questions féminines dans l'ancienne Rome". Revue des Deux Mondes (in French). 10 (4): 763–793. JSTOR 44805281.
- Potter, Franklin H. (1934). "Political Alliance by Marriage". Classical Journal. 29 (9): 663–674. JSTOR 3289822.
- Shackleton Bailey, D. R. (1968). Cicero's Letters to Atticus. Vol. 3. Cambridge University Press.
- Syme, Ronald (1960). "Bastards in the Roman Aristocracy". Proceedings of the American Philosophical Society. 104 (3): 323–327. JSTOR 985248.
- Syme, Ronald (1980a). "The Sons of Crassus". Latomus. 39 (2): 403–408. JSTOR 41531764.
- Syme, Ronald (1980b). "No Son for Caesar?". Historia. 29 (4): 422–437. JSTOR 4435732.
- Syme, Ronald (1987). "Marriage Ages for Roman Senators". Historia. 36 (3): 318–332. JSTOR 4436017.
- Watt, W. S. (1980). "Notes on Cicero Epistulae ad Familiares". Hermes. 108 (3): 357–365.
