= Lampetho =

Lampetho was an Amazon queen mentioned by French medieval poet Eustache Deschamps. She was a member of the female version of Deschamps' nine worthies, individuals who along with their male counterparts were historical, scriptural and legendary personages who embodied the ideals of chivalry, honor and privilege.

In 1591 German Lutheran theologian, pastor and historian Cyriacus Spangenberg added more detail about her and her fellow Amazons in his WeiberAdel. This work, the last part of his 921-page folio on the mythical and historical origins of the German nobility entitled Der AdelsSpiegel, is a celebration of female achievements. To that end, the work is filled with examples of women who serve as archetypes of virtues that should be imitated. Such an intuition might instill women with their own sense of virtue and thus, develop a proper sense of Lutheran piety.

== WeiberAdel ==
In WeiberAdel several groups of Amazons are mentioned: the first of Libyan origin was described as both vicious and magnanimous and came to Europe from Africa under the direction of a Queen Myrina (after they had slaughtered all their men folk) via traversing Spain and crossing the ocean. They eventually emigrated to the lands of Sarmatia after intermarrying with the Scythian peoples who had warred with them initially, under the mistaken impression of them being men. Later, a second godly group of Amazons of Germanic stock is introduced from whom Lampetho descended.

According to a story in the work that related the origins of this latter group of Amazons, the Germanic King Taurer (a descendant of the earlier King Alemann) was faced with a rising population, leading him to lead groups of people south into Hungary and down the Danube to a place near the Black Sea to resettle them. Among the group were single women and widows who were "wild and ardent" to the point that he could rely on them more than the men on the journey. As a reward for their valor, the women were given land sticking out into the water, from which they later staged war and conquered the lands of Pontus and Cappadocia. These Amazons were rendered monstrous by their rage, allowed no trespassers on their lands. Their descendants later went on to conquer all of Asia Minor.

They added to the legend of the better-known Greek legend of the Amazons (each capturing a man a month for reproduction, wearing men's clothes, leaving one breast bare and burning off one nipple to improve bow usage). In this version they also made drinking vessels from the skulls of the generals they captured to offer up sacrifices to the goddess Heeres or Diana, and showed them as a civilizing force of city builders willing to go to war to free the oppressed from injustice (noted in the work as unlike many men of the time who fought only for glory, defense or conquest).

Among the most prominent of the Amazon queens were Lampetho, who was in charge of internal order among the Amazons, and Marpesia, who was in charge of making war outside the borders. According to the work, around the year 1271 BC (which in Spangenberg's chronology was some 2700 years after the creation of the world) Marpesia was reportedly attacked and defeated in a battle with famed Greek hero, and slayer of the Chimera, Bellerophon when they attempted to invade Lycia.

== See also ==
- Lampedo
