= De Mulieribus Claris =

1361–62 biographies by Giovanni Boccaccio

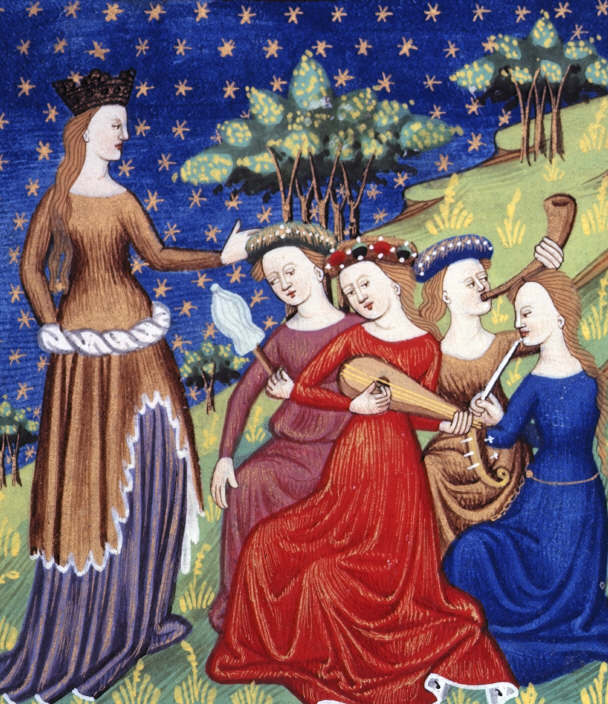
- A miniature depicting a queen with four musicians from a c. 1440 illuminated version of the De Claris Mulieribus held by the British Museum
- Author: Giovanni Boccaccio
- Original title: De Mulieribus Claris
- Language: Latin
- Genre: biography
- Publication date: 1361–62
- Publication place: Florence
- Media type: Manuscript
- Dewey Decimal: 920.72
- LC Class: PQ4274.D5 E5

De Mulieribus Claris or De Claris Mulieribus (Latin for "Concerning Famous Women") is a collection of biographies of historical and mythological women by the Florentine author Giovanni Boccaccio, composed in Latin prose in 1361–1362. It is the first collection devoted exclusively to biographies of women in post-ancient Western literature. At the same time as he was writing On Famous Women, Boccaccio also compiled a collection of biographies of famous men, De Casibus Virorum Illustrium (On the Fates of Famous Men).

== The famous women ==
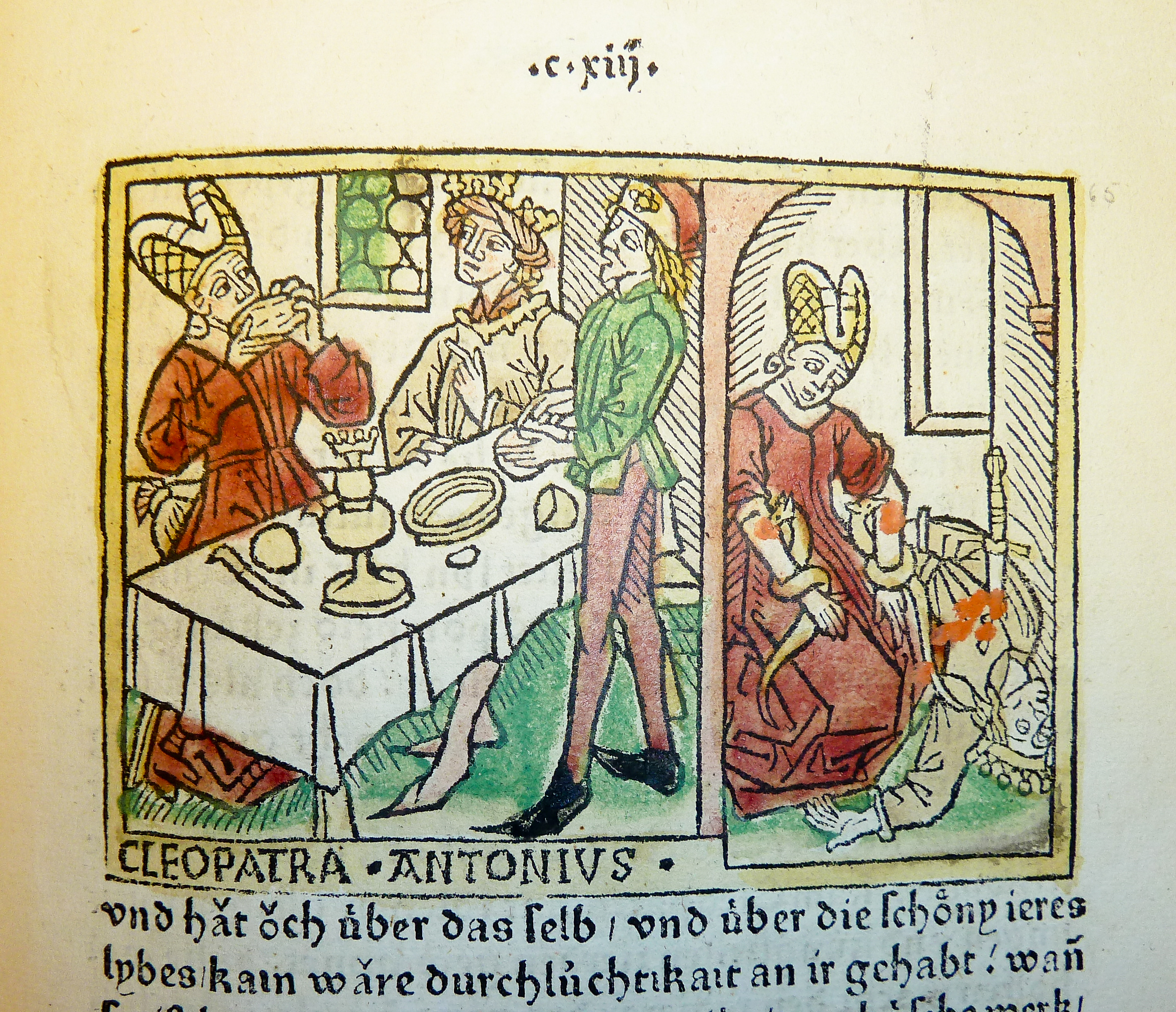
The Banquet of Cleopatra and Antony, a woodcut from a 1479 version of Giovanni Boccaccio's De Mulieribus Claris published in Ulm, Germany, which also depicts the suicides of Cleopatra and Antony

- 1. Eve, the first woman in the Bible
- 2. Semiramis, queen of the Assyrians
- 3. Opis, fertility and earth goddess, wife of Saturn
- 4. Juno, goddess of the Kingdoms
- 5. Ceres, goddess of the harvest and queen of Sicily
- 6. Minerva, Roman goddess of wisdom, justice, law, victory, and the sponsor of arts, trade, and strategy
- 7. Venus, queen of Cyprus
- 8. Isis, queen and goddess of Egypt
- 9. Europa, queen of Crete
- 10. Libya, queen of Libya
- 11 and 12. Marpesia and Lampedo, queens of the Amazons
- 13. Thisbe, a Babylonian maiden
- 14. Hypermnestra, queen of the Argives and priestess of Juno
- 15. Niobe, queen of Thebes
- 16. Hypsipyle, queen of Lemnos
- 17. Medea, queen of Colchis and lover of Jason in the "Argonautica"
- 18. Arachne of Colophon
- 19 and 20. Orithyia and Antiope, queens of the Amazons
- 21. Erythraea or Heriphile, a Sibyl
- 22. Medusa, daughter of Phorcus
- 23. Iole, daughter of the king of the Aetolians
- 24. Deianira, wife of Hercules
- 25. Jocasta, queen of Thebes
- 26. Amaltheia or Deiphebe, a Sibyl
- 27. Nicostrata, or Carmenta, daughter of King Ionius
- 28. Procris, wife of Cephalus
- 29. Argia, wife of Polynices and daughter of King Adrastus
- 30. Manto, daughter of Tiresias
- 31. The wives of the Minyans
- 32. Penthesilea, queen of the Amazons
- 33. Polyxena, daughter of King Priam
- 34. Hecuba, queen of the Trojans
- 35. Cassandra, daughter of King Priam of Troy
- 36. Clytemnestra, queen of Mycenae
- 37. Helen of Troy, whose abduction by Paris began the Trojan War
- 38. Circe, daughter of the Sun
- 39. Camilla, queen of the Volscians
- 40. Penelope, wife of Ulysses
- 41. Lavinia, queen of Laurentum
- 42. Dido, or Elissa, queen of Carthage
- 43. Nicaula, queen of Ethiopia
- 44. Pamphile, daughter of Platea
- 45. Rhea Ilia, a Vestal Virgin
- 46. Gaia Cyrilla (Tanaquil), wife of King Tarquinius Priscus
- 47. Sappho, poet from the island of Lesbos
- 48. Lucretia, wife of Collatinus
- 49. Tamyris, queen of Scythia
- 50. Leaena, a courtesan who was tortured to death by the dictator Hippias
- 51. Athaliah, queen of Jerusalem
- 52. Cloelia, a Roman maiden
- 53. Hippo, a Greek woman
- 54. Megullia Dotata
- 55. Veturia, a Roman matron
- 56. Thamyris, daughter of Micon
- 57. A conflation of Artemisia II and Artemisia I, queens of Caria
- 58. Verginia, virgin and daughter of Virginius
- 59. Eirene, daughter of Cratinus
- 60. Leontium
- 61. Olympias, queen of Macedonia
- 62. Claudia, a Vestal Virgin
- 63. Virginia, wife of Lucius Volumnius
- 64. Flora, goddess of flowers and wife of Zephyrus
- 65. A young Roman woman
- 66. Marcia, daughter of Varro
- 67. Sulpicia, wife of Quintus Fulvius Flaccus
- 68. Harmonia, daughter of Gelon, son of Hiero II of Syracuse
- 69. Busa of Canosa di Puglia
- 70. Sophonisba, queen of Numidia
- 71. Theoxena, daughter of Prince Herodicus
- 72. Berenice, queen of Cappadocia
- 73. The Wife of Orgiagon the Galatian
- 74. Tertia Aemilia, wife of the elder Africanus
- 75. Dripetrua, queen of Laodice
- 76. Sempronia, daughter of Gracchus
- 77. Claudia Quinta, a Roman woman
- 78. Hypsicratea, Queen of Pontus
- 79. Sempronia, a Roman Woman
- 80. The Wives of the Cimbrian
- 81. Julia, daughter of the dictator Julius Caesar
- 82. Portia, daughter of Cato Uticensis
- 83. Curia, wife of Quintus Lucretius
- 84. Hortensia, daughter of Quintus Hortensius
- 85. Sulpicia, wife of Cruscellio
- 86. Cornificia, a poet
- 87. Mariamne I, queen of Judaea
- 88. Cleopatra VII, queen of Egypt
- 89. Antonia, daughter of Antony
- 90. Agrippina the Elder, wife of Germanicus
- 91. Paulina, a Roman woman seduced by Decius Mundus pretending to be Anubis
- 92. Agrippina the Younger, wife of the Emperor Claudius, and mother of the Emperor Nero
- 93. Epicharis, a freedwoman
- 94. Pompeia Paulina, wife of Seneca
- 95. Poppaea Sabina, wife of Nero
- 96. Triaria, wife of Lucius Vitellius
- 97. Proba, wife of Adelphus
- 98. Faustina Augusta, wife of Marcus Aurelius
- 99. Symiamira, woman of Emesa
- 100. Zenobia, queen of Palmyra
- 101. Joan, an Englishwoman and Pope
- 102. Irene, Empress of the Byzantine Empire
- 103. Gualdrada, a Florentine maiden
- 104. Constance, Empress of Rome and queen of Sicily
- 105. Camiola, a Sienese widow
- 106. Joanna, queen of Jerusalem and Sicily
