= Decimus Junius Brutus Albinus =

Roman general, politician, and assassin of Julius Caesar (81–43 BC)

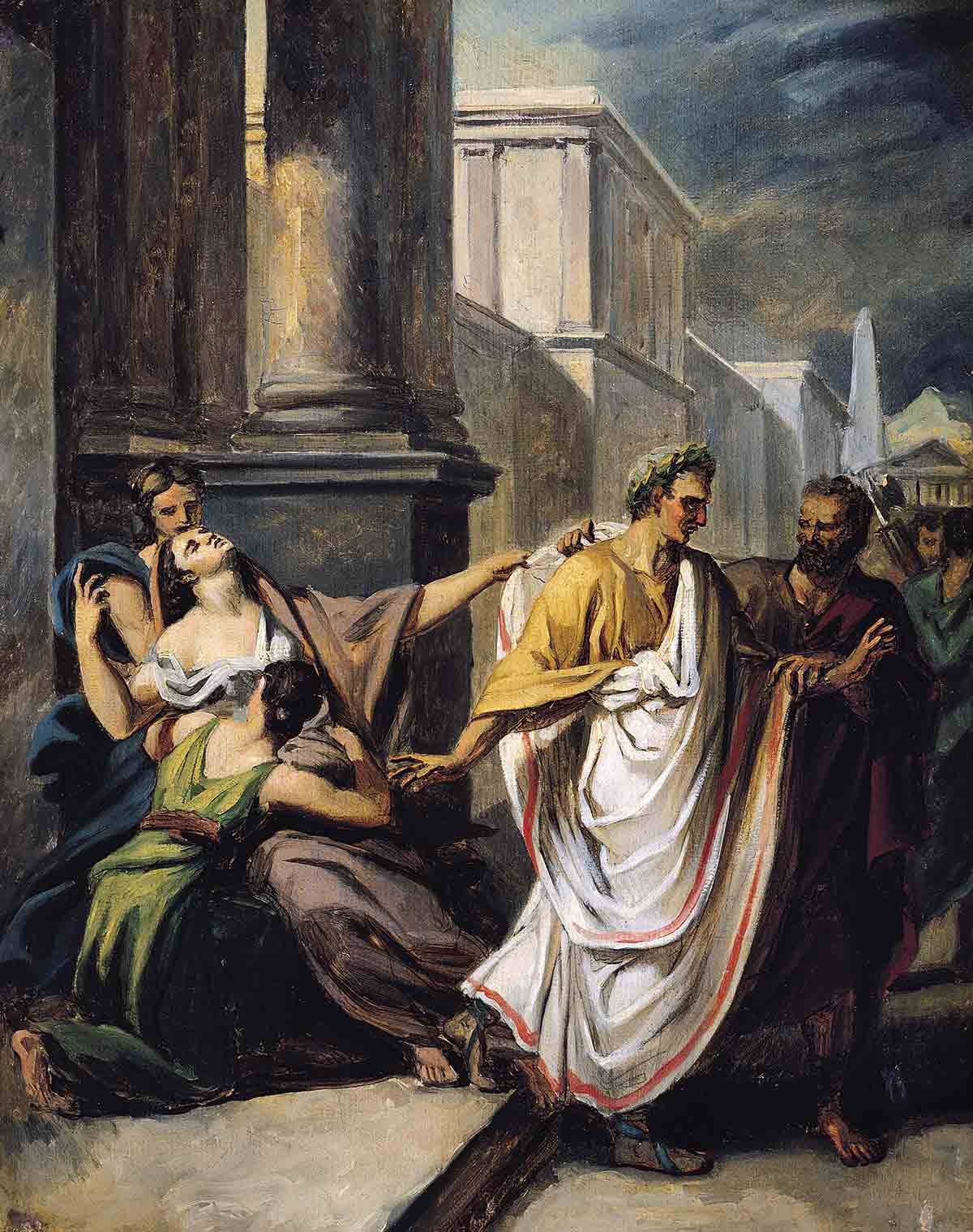
- Decimus Junius Brutus Albinus on the far right leading Julius Caesar to Pompey's Theater. Painting by Abel de Pujol.
- Born: 27 April 81 BC
- Died: September 43 BC (aged 38)
- Cause of death: Executed by a Gallic chief loyal to Mark Antony
- Occupations: General and politician
- Known for: Assassination of Julius Caesar
- Office: Quaestor (50 BC); Legate (Transalpine Gaul) (47–46 BC); Praetor (45 BC); Proconsul (Cisalpine Gaul) (44–43 BC); Consul designate (42 BC)
- Spouse: Valeria Polla
- Relatives: Decimus Junius Brutus (father); Sempronia (mother); Aulus Postumius Albinus (adoptive father)
- Military career
- Allegiance: Julius Caesar (until 44 BC); Liberatores (44–43 BC)
- Years: 56–43 BC
- Conflicts: Gallic Wars; Caesar's Civil War; Battle of Mutina

Decimus Junius Brutus Albinus (27 April 81 BC – September 43 BC) was a Roman general and politician of the late republican period and one of the leading instigators of Julius Caesar's assassination. He had previously been an important supporter of Caesar in the Gallic Wars and in the civil war against Pompey. Decimus Brutus is often confused with his distant cousin and fellow conspirator, Marcus Junius Brutus.

== Biography ==
=== Early life ===
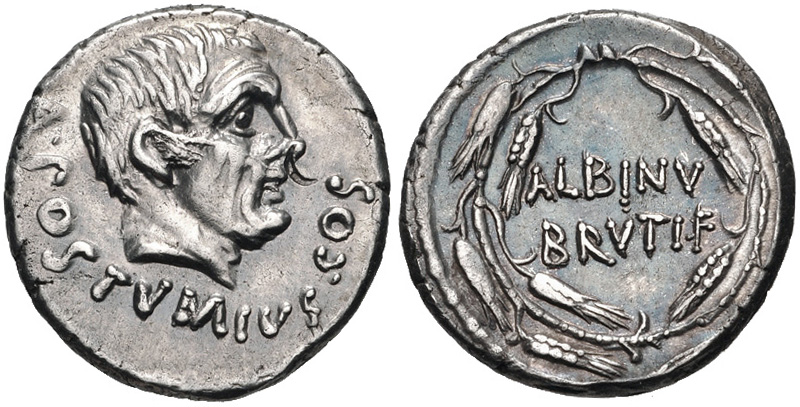
Denarius of Decimus Brutus minted in 48 BC. The obverse legend reads "Aulus Postumius consul", but it is unknown which one is depicted here (there were six consuls of that name). The reverse with the wreath of wheat-ears might refer to a supply of wheat ordered by this man.

Decimus was probably son of the Roman senator Decimus Junius Brutus and his notorious wife Sempronia, one of the participants in the conspiracy of Catilina in 63 BC. (Note: Ronald Syme suggested Postumia instead of Sempronia as the identity of Decimus's mother, since Decimus was related to the family of the Postumii Albini by adoption, and therefore probably by blood as well. This hypothesis has found little favor in scholarship.) His birthday seems to have been 27 April, and he was probably born in the year 81 BC, perhaps slightly earlier. Decimus was of distinguished ancestry: his father, grandfather and great-grandfather had all been consuls, and his mother was likely descended from Gaius Gracchus, the ill-fated popular reformer. He was also adopted by a patrician named Postumius Albinus, one of the last members of the ancient noble house which bore that name. Although some ancient sources accordingly refer to Decimus as 'Albinus', and the name also appears on some coins he himself minted, Decimus does not seem to have changed his name to reflect the adoption, as was customary, and his contemporaries continued referring to him by his birth name, even in official contexts. (Note: The adoptive father is generally identified as Aulus Postumius Albinus, a moneyer who minted coins for the dictator Sulla in 81 BC. Cadoux suggests his name after adoption would have been Aulus Postumius Albinus Brutus.)

On several occasions Julius Caesar expressed how he loved Decimus Brutus like a son. Syme argued that if a Brutus was the natural son of Caesar, Decimus was more likely than Marcus Brutus. Decimus was named an heir in the second degree in Caesar's will and was designated to become guardian of any child Caesar would have. Roman historian Appian interpreted this as being an adoption of Decimus by Caesar.

Although the first secure references to Decimus Brutus are to his military service in Gaul, there is some evidence that his associates at Rome in youth included Publius Clodius Pulcher, Gaius Scribonius Curio, and Marcus Antonius.

=== During the Wars ===
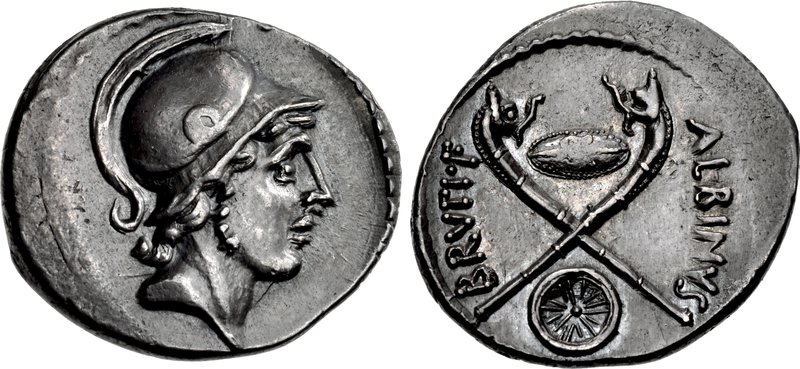
This denarius minted by Decimus Brutus in 48 BC, recalls his military service in Gaul, as the obverse features the head of Mars (the Roman god of War), and the reverse shows Gallic carnyces and shields.

He served in Caesar's army during the Gallic Wars and was given the command of the fleet in the war against the Veneti in 56 BC. In the decisive Battle of Morbihan, Decimus Brutus succeeded in destroying the Veneti's fleet. Using sickle-like hooks fitted on long poles, Decimus Brutus attacked the enemy's sails, leaving them immobilized and easy prey to Roman boarding parties. He also served against Vercingetorix in 52 BC.

When the Republican Civil War broke out, Decimus Brutus sided with his commander, Caesar, and was entrusted once again with fleet operations. Richard Billows argued that Caesar loved Decimus Brutus almost as a son. In 50 BC he married Paula Valeria, the sister of Gaius Valerius Triarius, a friend of Cicero who later fought alongside Pompey at Pharsalus.

The Greek city of Massilia (present-day Marseille) sided with Pompey the Great, and Caesar, hastening to reach Hispania and cut Pompey off from his legions, left Decimus Brutus in charge of the naval blockade of Massilia. Within thirty days, Decimus Brutus built a fleet from scratch, defeated the Massilian fleet twice, and together with Gaius Trebonius (who commanded the siege) secured the capitulation of Massilia.

=== Ides of March and its aftermath ===
When Caesar returned to Rome as dictator after the final defeat of the Conservative faction in the Battle of Munda (45 BC), Marcus Brutus joined the conspiracy against Caesar, after being convinced by Cassius and Decimus. In 44 BC, Decimus was made Praetor Peregrinus by personal appointment of Caesar and was designated to be the governor of Cisalpine Gaul in the following year.

On the Ides of March (March 15), Caesar initially decided not to attend the Senate meeting in the curia at the theatre of Pompey due to the concerns of his wife. He was persuaded to attend by Decimus Brutus, who escorted him to the senate house, and neatly evaded Mark Antony, who may have told Caesar of the assassination plot. After Caesar was attacked by the first assassin, Servilius Casca, Decimus and the rest of the conspirators attacked and killed him. In all, Caesar suffered approximately 23 stab wounds. According to Nicolaus of Damascus, Decimus struck him through the thigh.

The assassins received an amnesty the next day, issued by the senate at the instigation of Mark Antony, Caesar's fellow consul. But the situation was not peaceful; Rome's population and Caesar's legionaries wanted to see the conspirators punished. The group decided to lie low, and Decimus used his office of Praetor Peregrinus to stay away from Rome. Decimus was named an heir in the second degree in Caesar's will.

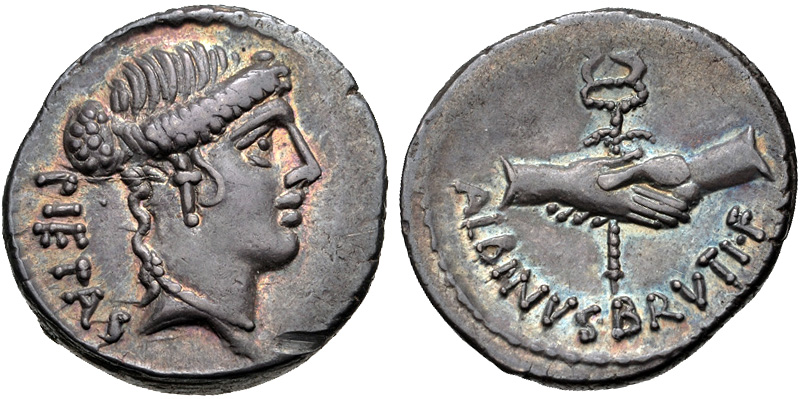
Denarius of Decimus Brutus, minted in 48 BC. The obverse depicts Pietas, while the reverse shows clasped hands around a caduceus, alluding to Julius Caesar's policy of reconciliation during the Civil War (Decimus still supported Caesar at this time).

=== Activity in Gallia Cisalpina ===
The climate of reconciliation soon passed, and slowly the conspirators were starting to feel the strain of the assassination. Already in March 44 BC, Decimus Brutus found his (earlier) allocation of the province of Cisalpine Gaul opposed by Antony. Nevertheless, by the autumn, Decimus Brutus was campaigning against local tribes in the province assigned to him by Caesar as propraetor, with his own troops. He was ordered by the Senate to surrender his province to Antony but refused, an act of provocation to which Antony was only too happy to respond. Defeating Decimus Brutus was a way for Antony to regain his ascendancy and get control of the strategically important Italian Gaul; while conversely Cicero encouraged the former to destroy Antony and thereby restore the commonwealth.

In 43 BC Decimus Brutus occupied Mutina, laying in provisions for a protracted siege. Antony obliged him, and blockaded Decimus Brutus' forces, intent on starving them out.

Nevertheless, the consuls of the year, Aulus Hirtius and Gaius Pansa, marched northward to raise the siege. Guided by Cicero (whose Philippics date from this time), the Senate was inclined to view Mark Antony as an enemy. Caesar Octavian, the nineteen-year-old heir of Caesar, and already raised to the rank of propraetor, accompanied Gaius Pansa north. The first confrontation occurred on April 14 at the battle of Forum Gallorum, where Antony hoped to deal with his opponents piecemeal. Antony defeated the forces of Gaius Pansa and Octavian, which resulted in Pansa suffering mortal wounds; however, Antony was then defeated by a surprise attack from Hirtius. A second battle on 21 April at Mutina resulted in a further defeat for Antony and Hirtius' death. Antony withdrew, unwilling to become the subject of a double circumvallation as Caesar had done to Vercingetorix at Alesia.

With the siege raised, Decimus Brutus cautiously thanked Octavian, now commander of the legions that had rescued him, from the other side of the river. Octavian coldly indicated he had come to oppose Antony, not aid Caesar's murderers. Decimus Brutus was given the command to wage war against Antony, but many of his soldiers deserted to Octavian.

=== Flight and death ===
With Cicero's support, however, Decimus Brutus crossed the Alps to join Plancus in the war against Antony; but when Plancus switched sides his position became untenable and he was forced to flee. He attempted to reach Macedonia, where Marcus Junius Brutus and Cassius had stationed themselves, but was executed en route in mid-September by Camelus, a Gallic chief loyal to Mark Antony.

Several letters written by Decimus Brutus during the last two years of his life are preserved among Cicero's collected correspondence.

== Cultural depictions ==
Decimus' legacy is not as notable as that of the other Brutus who was among the conspirators, Marcus Brutus, whom he is often confused for, or merged with, in depictions.

In Shakespeare's Julius Caesar, Decimus Brutus is mistakenly Decius, substituting for his praenomen the unrelated nomen of a different gens. He also appears in the play Cato, a Tragedy by Joseph Addison also here under the name "Decius". He appears under his actual name in the play The Tragedy of Cicero.

In Allan Massie's 1993 book entitled Caesar, Decimus Junius Brutus Albinus narrates his story and reason for joining in Caesar's assassination while being held captive by the Gallic chief.

In Colleen McCullough's novels Caesar and The October Horse (of her Masters of Rome series) Decimus Brutus is an important character. In these novels, he and Gaius Trebonius are portrayed as the real leaders of the assassination conspiracy.

In Conn Iggulden's Emperor series of books the historical figures of Decimus Brutus and Marcus Brutus are blended together into the one character named Marcus Brutus.

In Ben Kane's books The Forgotten Legion, The Silver Eagle, and Road To Rome, Decimus Brutus is shown as a fairly major character to the plot and the rest of the book as Fabiola's lover.

In Robert Harris' novel, Dictator, it is Decimus, not Marcus, who is the Brutus targeted during Caesar's assassination by Caesar's alleged accusatory words, "Even you?". The phrase, more often rendered as "Et tu", is immortalized in Shakespeare's Julius Caesar.

In S.J.A Turney's series of novels titled Marius Mules, Decimus Brutus is heavily featured as a brilliant naval commander and one of Caesar's most loyal officers.
