= Calypso (painter) =

Ancient Greek painter

- Born: 3rd century BC; Ancient Greece
- Died: Unknown
- Known for: Mention in Pliny's Natural History

Calypso, also known as Kalypso, was a supposed Ancient Greek painter who lived in the 3rd century BC. She is known from a mention in Pliny the Elder's Natural History along with several other prominent female painters.

She is one of the six female artists of antiquity mentioned in Pliny the Elder's Natural History (XL.147–148) in A.D. 77: Timarete, Irene, Calypso, Aristarete, Iaia, Olympias. During the Renaissance, the 14th-century humanist Boccaccio included Calypso in De mulieribus claris (Latin for On Famous Women).

== Account by Pliny ==
The standard Teubner edition of Pliny the Elder's Natural History mentions the painter Calypso in the following passage from the 147th chapter of its 35th book:

Pinxere et mulieres: Timarete, Miconis filia, Dianam, quae in tabula Ephesi est antiquissimae picturae; Irene, Cratini pictoris filia et discipula, puellam, quae est Eleusine, Calypso, senem et praestigiatorem Theodorum, Alcisthenen saltatorem; Aristarete, Nearchi filia et discipula, Aesculapium.[Women also paint: Timarete, daughter of Mykonos, Diana, whose painting is the oldest on the Ephesus panel; Irene, the daughter and pupil of the painter Cratinus, who did the Eleusine girl; Calypso, who did old age, the juggler Theodore and the dancer Alcisthenes; Aristarete, daughter and pupil of Nearchus, who did an Aesculapius.]

== Scholarly debate ==
The exact reading and grammar of Pliny's mention of the painter Calypso is subject to debate. In his account, a listing of several female names is given including Timarete, Irene, Aristarete, and Calypso. However, there is disagreement in the scholarly world about whether all four of these mentions are individual people. Calypso in particular could be interpreted to be either a painter in her own right, or simply a painting by Irene of the nymph Calypso of the Odyssey. The primary point of discussion is a possible corruption of the word Calypsonem (an accusatory case of the name) into the two separate words Calypso senem. The former reading would imply that Calypso was the name of a painting, while the latter would imply mention of the painter Calypso and a separate painting of Old Age personified.

Another piece of evidence which would suggest that Calypso is in fact not an actual person is the fact that every other female artist mentioned in this section also has their father or another prominent male figure related to them mentioned, while Calypso does not. Additionally, Calypso does not have a place of origin mentioned, nor does Pliny state that he is ignorant of where she is from.
