= Iaia =

Greek painter

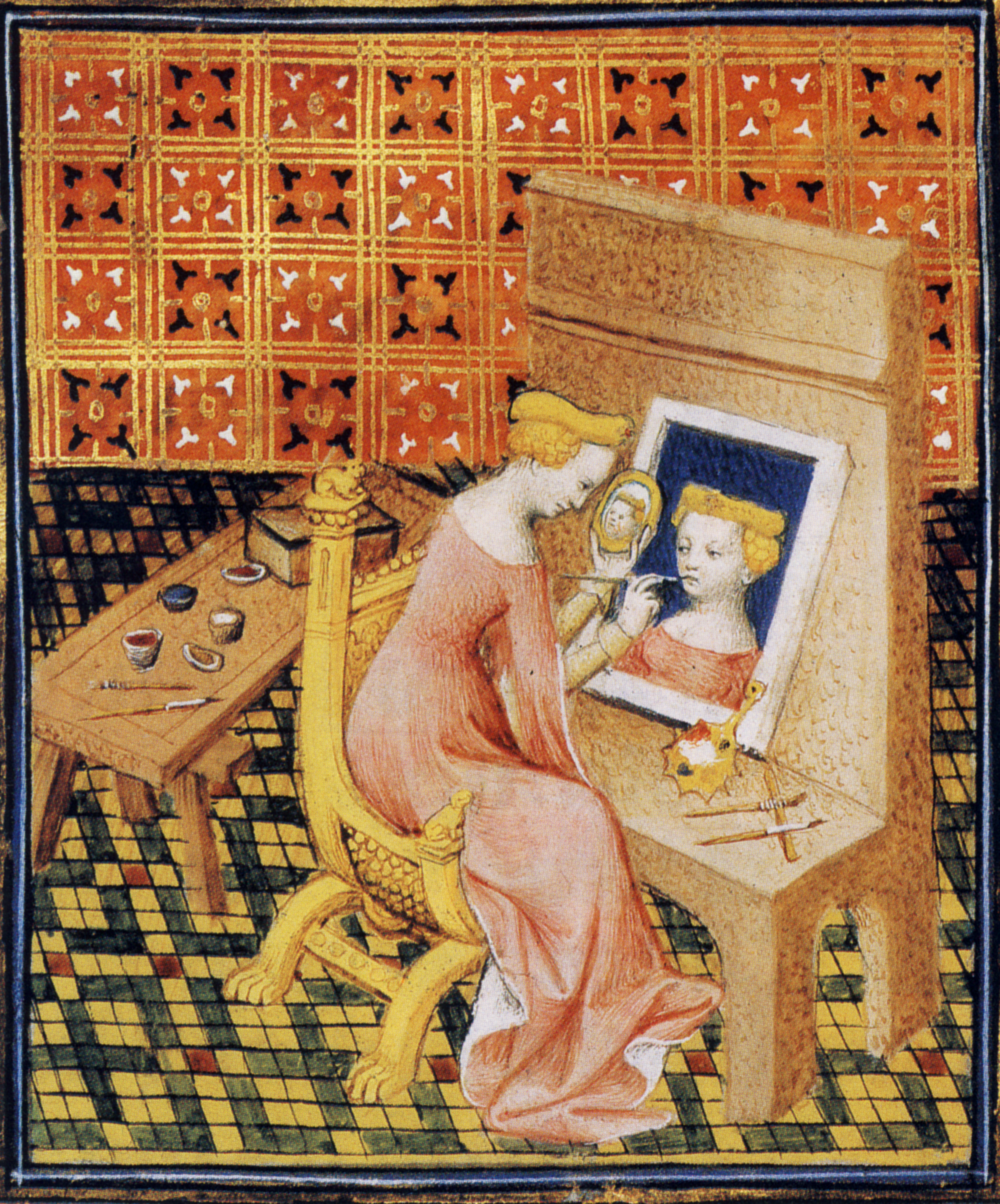
15th-century portrayal of Iaia from a French translation of De mulieribus claris.

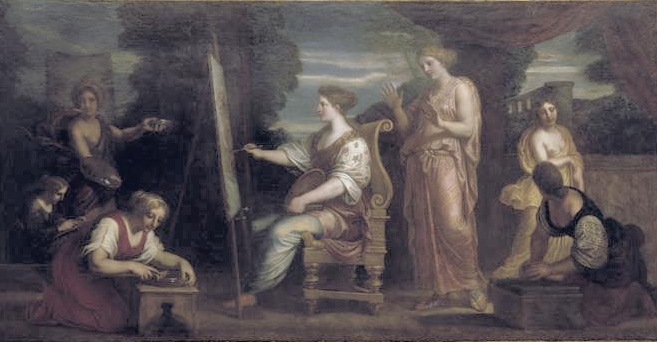
Michel Corneille the Younger, Lala of Cyzicus Painting, Palace of Versailles, 1672

Iaia of Cyzicus (Greek: Ιαία της Κυζίκου), sometimes (incorrectly) called Lala or Lalla, or rendered as Laia or Maia, was a Greek painter born in Cyzicus, Roman Empire, and relatively exceptional for being a woman artist and painting women's portraits. She was alive during the time of Marcus Terentius Varro (116–27 BC). In De Mulieribus Claris, his book of women's biographies, Boccaccio refers to her as "Marcia," possibly confusing her with the Vestal Virgin of that name. According to Pliny the Elder: "No one had a quicker hand than she in painting."

Most of her paintings are said to have been of women. Pliny attributes to Iaia a large panel painting of an old woman and a self-portrait. She was said to have worked faster and painted better than her male competitors, Sopolis and Dionysius, which enabled her to earn more than them.

== Life ==
Born in Cyzicus, Iaia was a famous painter and ivory carver. She probably came to Rome to meet the demand for art there in the late Roman Republic. Iaia remained unmarried all her life.

== Influence on culture ==
Iaia is one of several female artists of antiquity mentioned in Pliny the Elder's Natural History (XL.147–148), the others being Timarete, Irene, Aristarete, and Olympias. Pliny also possibly lists a sixth, Calypso, though this interpretation is disputed; most scholars accept an alternative reading in which Calypso is the subject of a painting by Irene. Iaia (as "Marcia") is one of three women artists mentioned in Boccaccio's De mulieribus claris.

Iaia is a character in Steven Saylor's novel Arms of Nemesis (1992), where she is depicted practicing her craft on the Bay of Naples in 72 B.C.E

The character of Julie Lambert, the protagonist of the novel Shining Harmony (2017) and the poetic anthology Living and Not Living (2018), both by Italian writer Sabrina Gatti, was inspired by Iaia. In the novel, Julie, a talented painter, sees in Iaia the artist to emulate and dedicates to her a painting where she portrays the Roman painter, intent on painting in her atelier; while in "Living and not living," the young woman is completely identified with Iaia.

Iaia (as Lalla) is one of the names featured on Judy Chicago's Heritage Floor.
