= Quintus Fulvius Flaccus =

Quintus Fulvius Flaccus was an ancient Roman name shared by various members of the Fulvii Flacci.

It may refer to:

- Quintus Fulvius Flaccus (consul 237 BC)
- Quintus Fulvius Flaccus (consul 180 BC)
- Quintus Fulvius Flaccus (consul 179 BC)
- Quintus Fulvius Flaccus, husband of Suplicia
