= Gaius Valerius Triarius =

1st-century BC Roman politician and general

Gaius Valerius Triarius (died c. 45 BC) was a First Century BC Roman politician and general, a member of the gens Valeria. During the Third Mithridatic War he served as a legate to Lucius Licinius Lucullus, the Roman commander in charge of the war effort against king Mithridates VI of Pontus. He played a pivotal role in the capture of Heraclea Pontica, but was later defeated by Mithridates at the Battle of Zela in 67 BC.

== Family background ==
Triarius belonged to the famous gens Valeria, but unlike the more famous members of the gens, the Triarii were plebeian. The cognomen Triarius may be an allusion to their military service, since the third, the most veteran, line of the Republican legions were named the Triarii. Triarius's father was likewise named Gaius. He also had a brother, Lucius Valerius Triarius, who was quaestor in 81 and praetor in 78. Triarius married Flaminia, a friend of Servilia (Cato's half-sister and mother of Brutus).

== Military career ==
In 72 BC, after defeating the Mithridatic fleet at Lemnos, Lucullus put Triarius in charge of his fleet and ordered him to patrol the northern coastline of Asia Minor. Eventually, Triarius took the fleet to Heraclea Pontica and supported Lucullus's proconsular colleague Marcus Aurelius Cotta who was besieging the city. Heraclea held out against its besiegers until Machares, one of the sons of Mithridates and his governor of the Bosporian Kingdom, betrayed his father and stopped supplying the defenders from his dominions north of the Black Sea. Machares halted his supply shipments in exchange for the status of 'Friend and Ally'. Connacorex, the commander of the Mithridatic garrison, decided to abandon Mithridates's cause, but since he did not trust Cotta he started negotiations with Triarius whom he considered more trustworthy. Connacorex and his men escaped by sea, Triarius letting him through his naval blockade. After the garrison had left Triarius sailed into the harbour and took the city. Triarius's troops started to loot, those Heracleans who escaped the atrocities made their way to Cotta's camp and apprised him of the situation. There was nearly a civil war as Cotta's men felt cheated out of their shared of the glory and plunder.

In the spring of 67 BC, Mithridates, who had been driven out of his kingdom by Lucullus, suddenly returned and he caught the Romans off guard. The Romans had not expected Mithridates to strike at them in Pontus, Lucullus and the bulk of his army had left for Northern Mesopotamia where they were laying siege to Nisibis. Marcus Fabius Hadrianus, whom Lucullus had left in command of Pontus, tried to defeat Mithridates in battle, but was routed. Hadrianus sent out desperate messengers to his commander, Lucullus, and to Gaius Valerius Triarius, his fellow legate, who was nearby bringing reinforcements to Lucullus. Triarius arrived first reinforcing Hadrianus and assuming command of the combined army. Mithridates pulled his forces back towards Comana and awaited the Romans. Plutarch and Appian claim Triarius wanted to defeat Mithridates before Lucullus could arrive and take the glory for himself, but this is in dispute. Triarius marched his army to Comana, he camped his army near Zela, within striking distance of Mithridates's camp. During the night there was a tornado, which both sides interpreted the omen, as a call to a final, decisive battle. The next day the Romans marched on Mithridates's camp, he met them on the plain. Mithridates first threw his entire force against one section of the advancing enemy and defeated them while holding off the rest. He then rode his cavalry round the rear of the remaining force, attacked them from the front and the rear and broke them too. The fight was long and brutal, but eventually the Mithridatic troops drove the Romans back into a trench Mithridates had constructed in preparation of the battle and had then flooded to conceal it from sight. Many Romans became trapped against this unexpected obstacle and were cut down in great numbers. Eventually, Triarius and some of his troops managed to flee, leaving 7,000 dead, including 24 tribunes and 150 centurions. Lucullus had to hide Triarius to keep him from being lynched by his soldiers.

== Children ==
From Flaminia, Triarius had two sons, Gaius and Publius. During the Civil War Gaius joined the faction opposing Caesar. In 48 BC, Gaius with D. Lealius commanded the flotilla gathered from the Roman Asia province and patrolled the Adriatic to keep grain from reaching Italy and to blockade any Caesarian forces. Gaius was also one of Pompey's advisors at the Battle of Pharsalus, he was the one who advised Pompey not to let his infantry line charge at the outset of battle, but to stand firm and allow the Caesarians to break their own ranks and exhaust themselves by charging twice the distance they would expect. His second son Publius is known for having sued Marcus Aemilius Scaurus for corruption in 54.

The elder Triarius may also be the father of Paula Valeria, whose marital intrigues are mentioned in the letters of Cicero. She divorced her first husband, of unknown name, to marry Decimus Junius Brutus Albinus, one of the leading men in the conspiracy that led to the assassination of Julius Caesar.

== Bibliography ==
=== Ancient Sources ===
- Appian, Mithridatic Wars.
- Cicero, Epistulae ad Familiares.
- Cicero, De finibus bonorum et malorum.

=== Modern sources ===
- Marie-Nicolas Bouillet & Alexis Chassang (red.), Dictionnaire universel d’histoire et de géographie, 1878.
- T. Robert S. Broughton, The Magistrates of the Roman Republic, American Philological Association, 1951–1952.
- Arthur Keaveney, Lucullus, A Life, 1992.
- Lee Fratantuono, Lucullus: The Life and Campaigns of a Roman Conqueror, 2008.
- Philip Matyszak, Mithridates the Great: Rome's Indomitable Enemy, 2017.
- August Pauly, Georg Wissowa, Friedrich Münzer, et alii, Realencyclopädie der Classischen Altertumswissenschaft (abbreviated RE), J. B. Metzler, Stuttgart, 1894–1980.
