= Lampedo =

Amazon queen

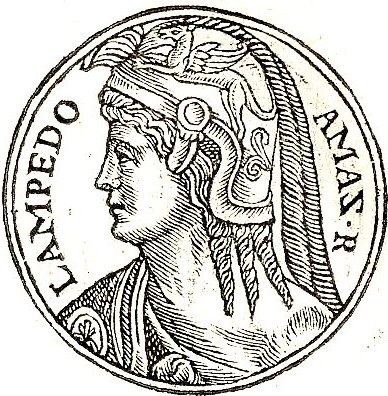
Lampedo from Promptuarii Iconum Insigniorum by Guillaume Rouillé

Lampedo (Greek for "burning torch"; also Lampeto) is an Amazon queen mentioned in Roman historiography. She ruled with her sister Marpesia. The sisters called themselves daughters of Mars to put terror in the heart of their enemies to show they were incredible warriors to be feared. Her name was speculated to refer to traditional New Moon torchlit processions in honor of Artemis, goddess of the hunt.

The story of the development of the Amazon nation follows the history recorded by Ephorus, a writer of the 4th century BC. An aristocratic faction sent Sylisios and Scolopicus, men of royal blood from Scythia, into exile. With the faction they all ultimately came to the Thermodon River in Cappadocia and took over the lands of the Cyrian people. They pillaged and robbed the people of the area. Most of the males were killed by the men of Scythia and their faction. The widows that were left found their situation deplorable. They then banded together in a tribe with the remaining few young males and took out their enemy and continued to wage war then against their neighboring countries. The warring women then banded together and killed the remaining husbands of the Scythians' massacre to remove the appearance that destiny had somehow treated these other married women differently and that they were special.

Afterwards they then sued for peace with their enemies. To assure royal succession they then had intimate relations with the men of the adjacent areas and returned home after they knew they were pregnant. The babies that were males were killed immediately and the females were raised carefully to become outstanding warriors. The right breast of the young girls was bound or removed so that it did not hinder them from being excellent archers. The left breast was left intact for their future babies. By folk etymology, this practice is where the name "Amazon" (Greek, a- meaning "without" and mazos meaning "breast") comes from.

Describing the records of the Scythians Diodorus of Sicily has a similar history of the founding of the Amazon nation. The same story was told by Xenophon, who wrote nearly four centuries earlier and is repeated by Paulus Orosius and the Latin historian Justin. Even the famous modern writer of children encyclopedias Donald J. Sobol tells a very similar version.

In Giovanni Boccaccio's Famous women, a chapter is dedicated to Lampedo and Marpesia.

For more, including Bellerophon slaying Marpesia, see Lampetho.

== See also ==
- Lampetho
