= Theoxena of Thessaly =

Legendary woman of the Classical era

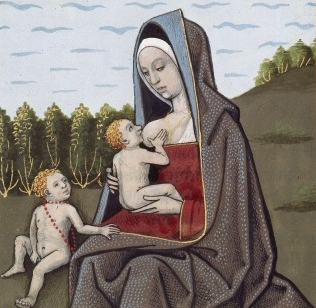
Theoxena, daughter of Herodicus.

Theoxena of Thessaly (Greek: Θεοξένα, fl. 3rd/2nd century BC) is a legendary woman of the Classical era. According to Boccaccio's De Mulieribus Claris, she was a daughter of Herodicus of Thessaly.
