= Decimus Junius Brutus (consul 77 BC) =

Roman consul 77 BC

Decimus Junius Brutus (fl. 1st century BC) was a Roman politician who was elected consul in 77 BC.

== Career ==
A member of the plebeian gens Junia, his father was Decimus Junius Brutus Callaicus and his mother was a Clodia, either from the Pulchri or Marcelli. He was one of the young nobles who fought against Lucius Appuleius Saturninus and killed him and his followers in the Curia Hostilia. A supporter of the Dictator, Lucius Cornelius Sulla, he was elected Praetor, probably in 80 BC. He was criticised for his support of Sulla after Sulla's death by Marcus Aemilius Lepidus.

In 77 BC, he was elected consul alongside Mamercus Aemilius Lepidus Livianus. Neither Junius Brutus nor his consular colleague accepted a proconsular command in Hispania to help Quintus Caecilius Metellus Pius in the Sertorian War.

In 74 BC, Junius Brutus put up his lands for security on behalf of a relative who was brought up on charges before Verres, the praetor urbanus. Brutus was still alive in 63 BC, when his wife Sempronia was caught up in the conspiracy of Catiline. It was during one of his absences from Rome that the conspirators met at his house.

Junius Brutus’ short political career is accounted for by the fact that he was more involved in the civil and legal spheres of public life rather than the political, and he was noted as a man well versed in Greek and Latin learning.

== Personal life ==
Brutus was married to a woman named Sempronia. His son was Decimus Junius Brutus Albinus, one of the assassins of Julius Caesar (not to be confused with his distant cousin and fellow assassin Marcus Junius Brutus). Historian Ronald Syme proposed that Brutus may have been married to another woman before Sempronia, a Postumia who could have been a sister of the wife of Servius Sulpicius Rufus, he states that it is possible that this Postumia could have been Decimus Junius Brutus Albinus mother instead of Sempronia.

== Sources ==
- Brennan, T. Corey, The Praetorship in the Roman Republic, Volume 2 (2000)
- Gruen, Erich S., The Last Generation of the Roman Republic (1995)
- Broughton, T. Robert S., The Magistrates of the Roman Republic, Vol. II (1951)
- Smith, William, Dictionary of Greek and Roman Biography and Mythology, Vol III (1867).

Political offices
Preceded by Marcus Aemilius Lepidus; Quintus Lutatius Catulus	Roman consul 77 BC with Mamercus Aemilius Lepidus Livianus	Succeeded by Gnaeus Octavius; Gaius Scribonius Curio
