= Orlando d'Aragona =

Sicilian nobleman (1296–1361)

Orlando/Roland
- strategos of Messina
- Coat of arms of Aragonese Sicily

Governor of Palermo
- Reign: 1343–1345
- Born: 1296
- Died: 1361 (aged 64–65); Caltanissetta, Sicily
- Noble family: of Barcelona
- Issue: Alfonso; Federigo; Juan; Sybilla
- Father: Frederick II of Sicily
- Mother: Sibilla Sormella

Orlando (or Roland; 1296–1361) was the second-eldest illegitimate son of Frederick II of Sicily by his concubine Sibilla di Sormella. During his father's reign, he lived in the shadows, but he rose to influence in the courts of his half-brother Peter II and his nephews, Louis and Frederick IV, especially as the leader of the Catalan party after the death of his brother Giovanni of Randazzo.

In 1339, he was present fighting the Angevins then trying to conquer Lipari. Taken captive, he was freed in November 1340 through the intervention of a Sienese widow, Camiola Turinga, a woman he promised to marry. He never did and was considered highly ungrateful by contemporaries, including Boccaccio.

From 1343 to 1345, he was the governor of Palermo and in 1345, strategos of Messina. He supported the duke of Randazzo as regent during the reign of Louis and then supported his sister-in-law Elisabeth of Carinthia after the duke's death. He was sent as an ambassador to Sardinia on behalf of Peter IV of Aragon in 1353. He continued to help Elisabeth into the reign of his other nephew Frederick the Simple.

He was a soldier and a general during the last wars between the houses of Barcelona and Anjou for possession of Trinacria. He distinguished himself in the Battle of Aci and in defending Messina from the Angevins. In 1358, he reconquered the area from Vizzini to Avola. He died in a spring skirmish at Caltanissetta, during the war between Federico Chiaramonte and Francesco Ventimiglia. Orlando had four children: Alfonso, Federigo, Juan, and Sybilla.

All boys were Barons of Avola, Sicily only Juan had issue and their descendants, while Sybilla married into Maltese nobility Michele de Bava, Baron de Djar-il-Bniet in Dingli, Rabat, on the island of Malta and had issue.

== Sources ==
- Giunta, Francesco. "Aragona, Orlando d'." In Alberto M. Ghisalberti, ed. Dizionario Biografico degli Italiani. Rome, 1961.
