= Eirene (artist) =

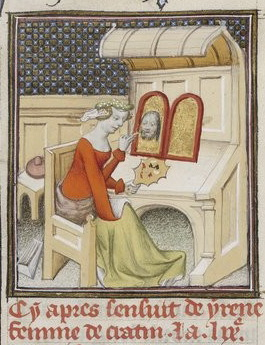
Illustration of Eirene from a 1403 copy of On Famous Women

Eirene or Irene (Greek: Ειρήνη) was an ancient Greek artist described by Pliny the Elder in the 1st century. She was the daughter of a painter, and created an image of a girl that was housed at Eleusis.

One of the five or six female artists of antiquity mentioned in Pliny the Elder's Natural History (XXXV.147-148) in A.D. 77: Timarete, Irene, Aristarete, Iaia, Olympias, and possibly Calypso.

During the Renaissance, Giovanni Boccaccio, a 14th-century humanist, included Eirene in De mulieribus claris (Latin for On Famous Women). Some of the paintings he credits to Eirene are an older Calypso, the gladiator Theodorus, and Alcisthenes, a famous dancer.

== See also ==
- Women artists
