= Megullia Dotata =

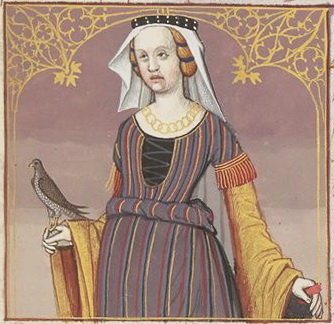
Image from De mulieribus claris

Megullia, surnamed Dotata ('richly dowered'), was an ancient Roman noblewoman.

== Life ==
Megullia is one of the one hundred and six subjects of Giovanni Boccaccio’s On Famous Women (De mulieribus claris, 1362). She is famous (as Boccaccio says) "more through the lavishness of her ancestors than through the worthiness of any of her own deeds. For at that time it seemed such a marvellous thing to give 50,000 bronze coins as dowry to one's husband..." Boccaccio used manuscripts of Valerius Maximus as his source, but they "disagree widely about the amount of money in Megullia's dowry".

== Dotata ==
At the beginning of the Roman republic dowries were small.

== See also ==
- Paraphernalia
