= Camiola =

Wife of Roland of Sicily (14th century)

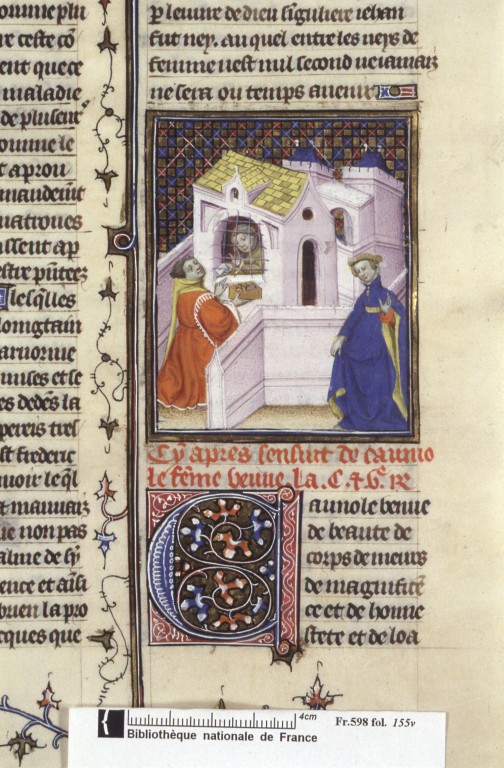
Miniature from De mulieribus claris, representing Camiola

Camiola Turinga was a Sicilian woman who was the wife of Roland of Sicily.

== Life ==
Camiola was born 1310 as the daughter Lorenzo of Thuringia and his wife a noblewoman of Messina. Having become a widow in 1339 she somehow came to be known the nobleman Orlando of Aragon. Orlando (or Roland) was an illegitimate son of Frederick II of Sicily and his mistress Sibilla di Sormella.

Orlando was fighting the Angevins then trying to conquer Lipari. Orlando was taken captive and was only he freed in November 1340 through the assistance of Camiola, who is said to have used up half of her fortune to free him. Wary of the implications of her actions damaging her reputation, Camiola was promised that Orlando would marry her after he was free again.

But Orlando broke his word to Camiola, and she decided to take her case to court. Camiola showed the court a written document of the promised marriage and therefore the court decreed that Orlando was the legal husband of Camiola. They also stated that everything that had been bought with the gold Camiola had given Orlando was her property.

Having no other choice but to abide by the courts decision, Orlando appeared at the wedding ceremony, where he was met by Camiola who reproached him in front of the guests and refused to marry him despite the entreaties of the others.

Camiola instead became a nun at the convent Santa Maria di Basicò where she died on 21 May 1345. Orlando eventually married Maria de Stromoncourt.

== Other uses ==
The English playwright Philip Massinger based one of his best characters of The Maid of Honour on Boccaccio's heroine Camiola.
