= Pamphile =

Was the daughter of Platea, or of Apollo (Latous), a woman of the Greek island of Kos

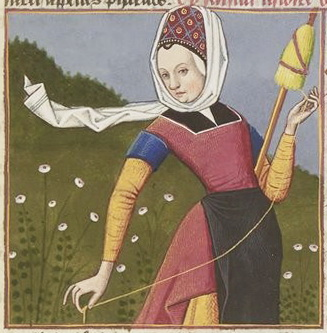
Panphyle in Boccaccio's De mulieribus claris

Pamphile (Greek: Παμφίλη), Panphyle, Plateae filia or Latoi filia, was the daughter of Plateas, or of Apollo (Latous), a woman of the Greek island of Kos. Pliny the Elder says that she was the first person to weave silk.
