= Hippo (Greek woman) =

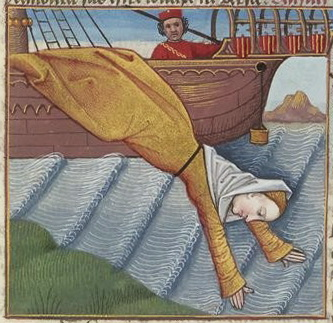
- Known for: Mentioned by the 1st century AD Latin author Valerius Maximus as an example of chastity

Hippo was a Greek woman mentioned by the 1st century AD Latin author Valerius Maximus as an example of chastity. She was also included among the Famous Women written about by Giovanni Boccaccio in the 14th century.

== In Valerius Maximus ==
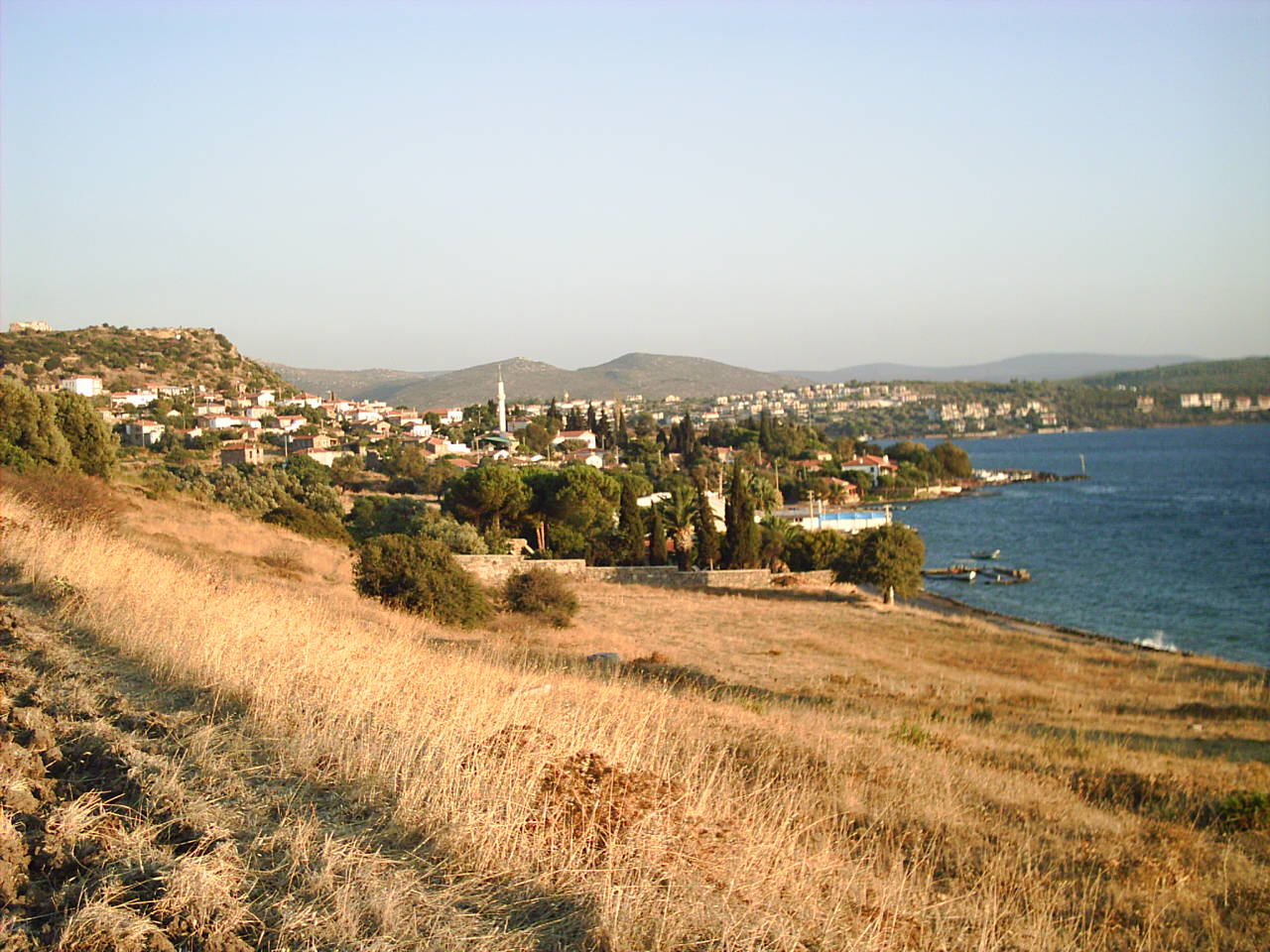
Bay of Erythrae

Valerius Maximus included the story of Hippo in his Facta et dicta memorabilia as a foreign example of chastity to complement the Roman stories he has previously related. He stated that when Hippo was abducted by an enemy fleet, she decided to save her chastity at the cost of her life, and threw herself into the sea to her death. Her body was washed up on the shore of Erythrae. According to Valerius Maximus, a tomb was built for her which survived in his own day, and her glorious reputation had endured among the Greeks.

== In Boccaccio ==
Valerius Maximus served as the source for Boccaccio's more elaborate account of Hippo.

Boccaccio observed that no history of her ancestry or her place of birth survived, other than from "books of the ancients" which stated that she was Greek and that she was known for a single virtuous act. He gave a more detailed explanation than Valerius Maximus of Hippo's decision to kill herself, stating that she was beautiful and was aware that her captors planned to rape her. He says that after being tossed by the waves, Hippo's body was cast onto the Erythraean shore, where the inhabitants buried her like one who had been shipwrecked, but that her name and the cause of her death were later disclosed by her enemies, when the Erythraeans built her a great, long-lasting tomb as a memorial.

Boccaccio himself praised Hippo's conduct, remarking that she saved her chastity at the cost of perhaps a few more years of life and gained with her premature death eternal honour for herself.

== Primary sources ==
- Livy, Ab urbe condita
- Plutarch, De Mulierum Virtutibus
- Valerius Maximus, Factorum ac dictorum memorabilium

== Secondary sources ==
- Brown, Virginia, translation of Giovanni Boccaccio’s On Famous Women by Cambridge and London (2001), Harvard University Press; ISBN 0-674-01130-9
- Guarino, G. A., Boccaccio, Concerning Famous Women (New Brunswick, N.J., 1963)
- Walker, Henry John, translation of Valerius Maximus' Memorable Deeds and Sayings: One Thousand Tales from Ancient Rome, Hackett Publishing (2004), ISBN 0-87220-674-2
