= Busa (Apulian noblewoman) =

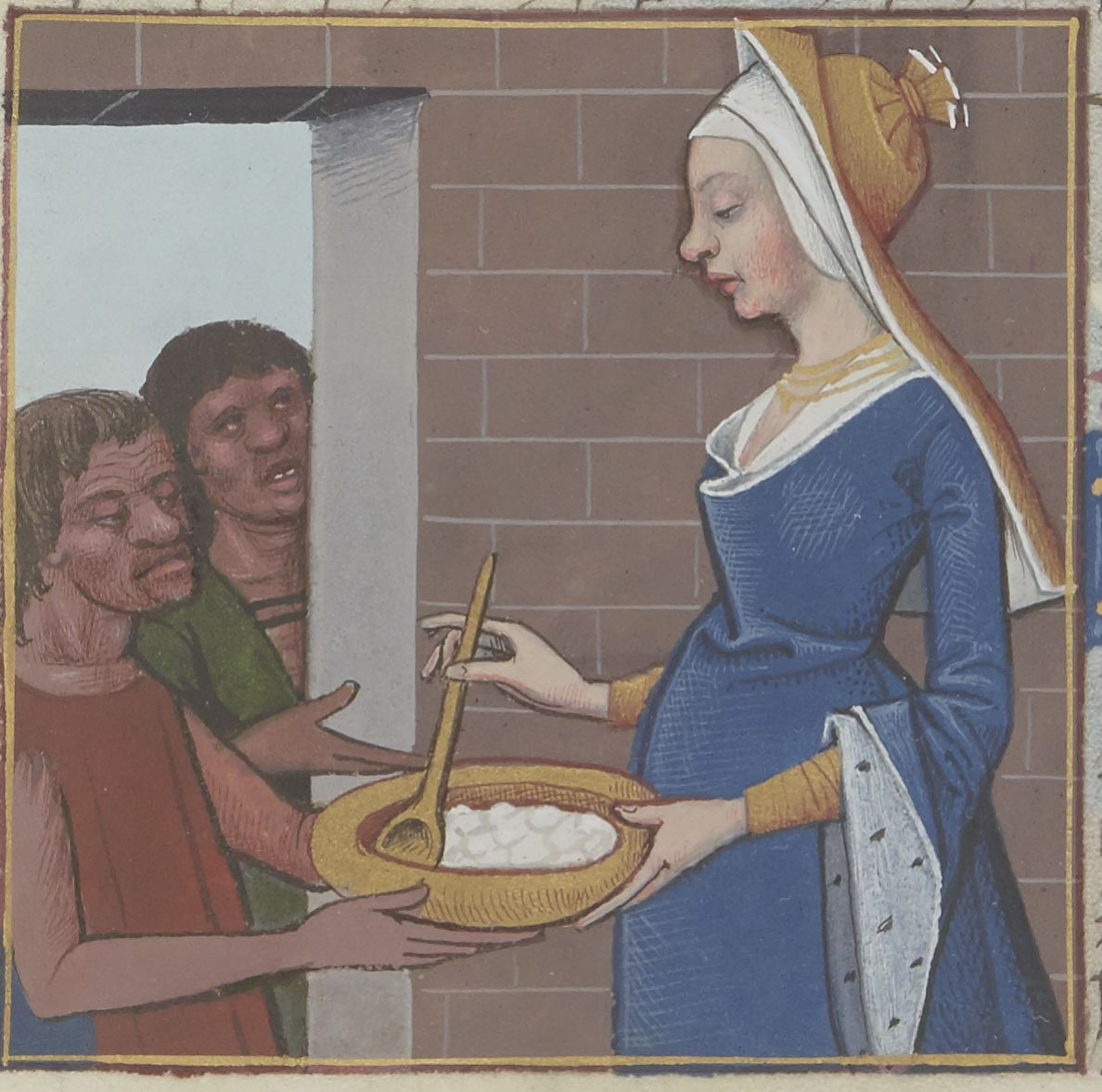
- Miniature from De mulieribus claris

Busa was a noble Apulian woman from Canusium who lived during the third century BC. Paulina is sometimes believed to have been her given name and Busa is recorded as her principal family name.

== Life ==
For the greatness of her acts, she received public honors from the Roman senate at the end of the war. The possibility of receiving public honors could have also been the motivation for Busa to lend aid to the soldiers.

Valerius Maximus sees her deeds as somewhat less heroic. Although he mentions her in Book VIII of his Memorable Deeds and Sayings (On Liberality), concerning people who show true judgment and honorable benevolence, because she did not impoverish herself by helping the Roman troops she cannot be compared with the likes of (for example) Fabius Maximus, who recovered prisoners from Hannibal but by doing so impoverished himself.
