= Aulus Postumius =

Aulus Postumius may refer to a number of different people from Roman history:

- Aulus Postumius (military tribune 180 BC), one of the military tribunes in 180 BC
- Aulus Postumius Albinus (disambiguation), Romans
- Aulus Postumius Albus Regillensis, consul in 496 BC
- Aulus Postumius Albus Regillensis (consul 464 BC)
- Aulus Postumius Tubertus, master of the horse in 434 BC
