= Nine Worthies =

Medieval personifications of chivalry

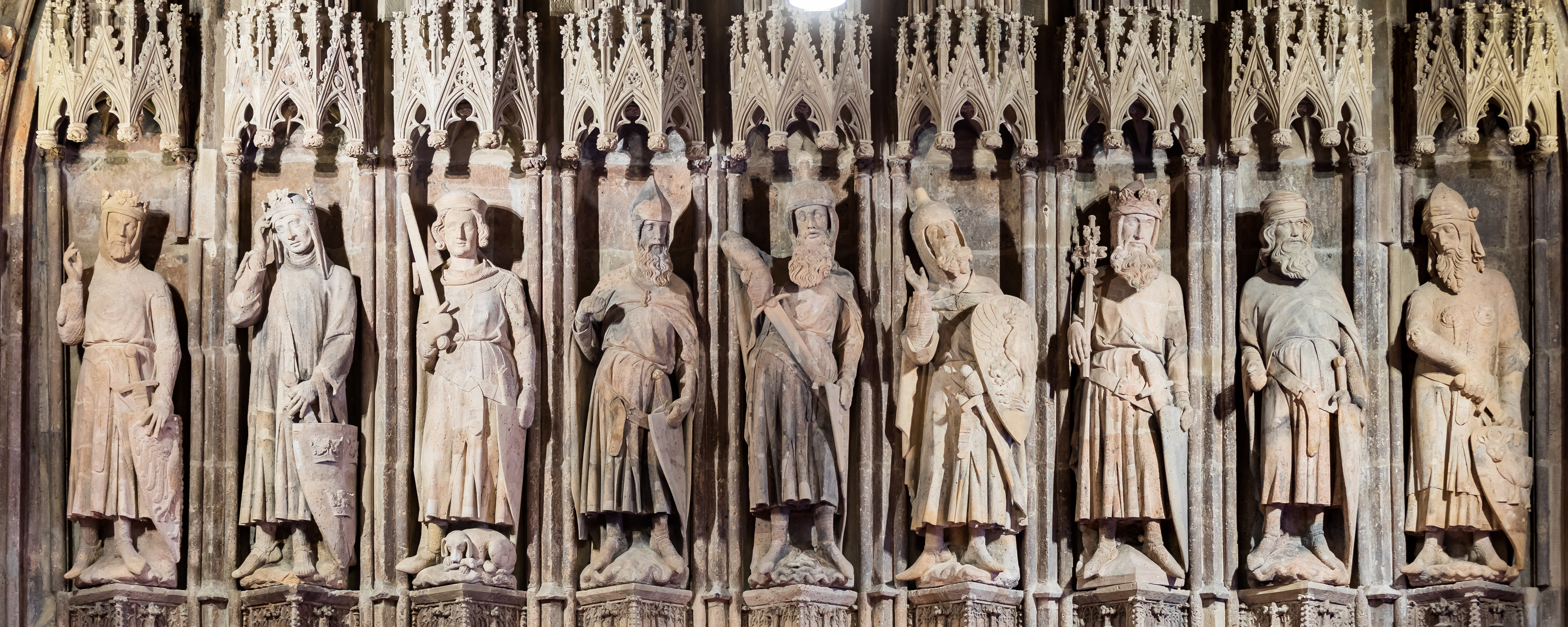
The 14th-century carving "Nine Good Heroes" (known as "Neun Gute Helden" in the original German) at City Hall in Cologne, Germany, is one of the earliest known representations of the Nine Worthies, made after 1349. From left to right are the three Christians: Charlemagne bearing an eagle upon his shield, King Arthur displaying three crowns, and Godfrey of Bouillon with a dog lying before him; then the three pagans: Julius Caesar, Hector, and Alexander the Great bearing a griffon upon his shield; and finally the three Jews: David holding a sceptre, Joshua, and Judah Maccabee.

The Nine Worthies are nine historical, scriptural, and legendary men of distinction who personify the ideals of chivalry established in the Middle Ages, whose lives were deemed a valuable study for aspirants to chivalric status. All were commonly referred to as 'Princes', regardless of their historical titles. In French they are called Les Neuf Preux or "Nine Valiants", giving a more specific idea of the moral virtues they exemplified: those of soldierly courage and generalship. In Italy they are known as i Nove Prodi.

The Nine Worthies include three pagans (Hector, Alexander the Great, and Julius Caesar), three Jews (Joshua, David, and Judas Maccabeus), and three Christians (King Arthur, Charlemagne, and Godfrey of Bouillon).

== Origin ==
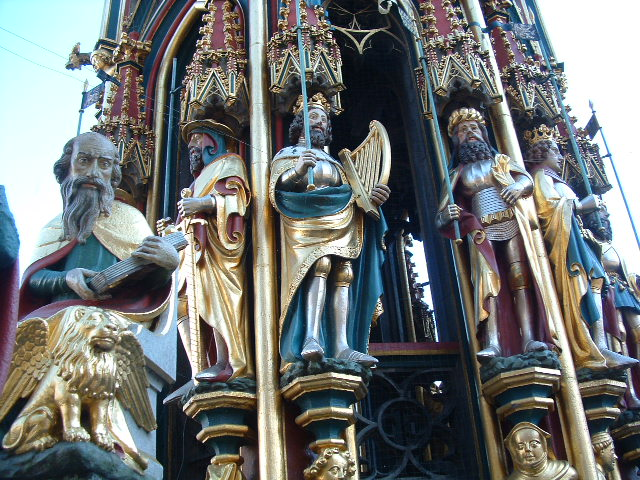
Statues of the Nine Worthies on the Schöne Brunnen (beautiful fountain) in Nuremberg (1385–1396). Visible on the fountain, from left to right are: Judah Maccabee, David (with harp), Julius Caesar, Alexander. The figure in the left foreground, St Mark, with his lion, is part of another group

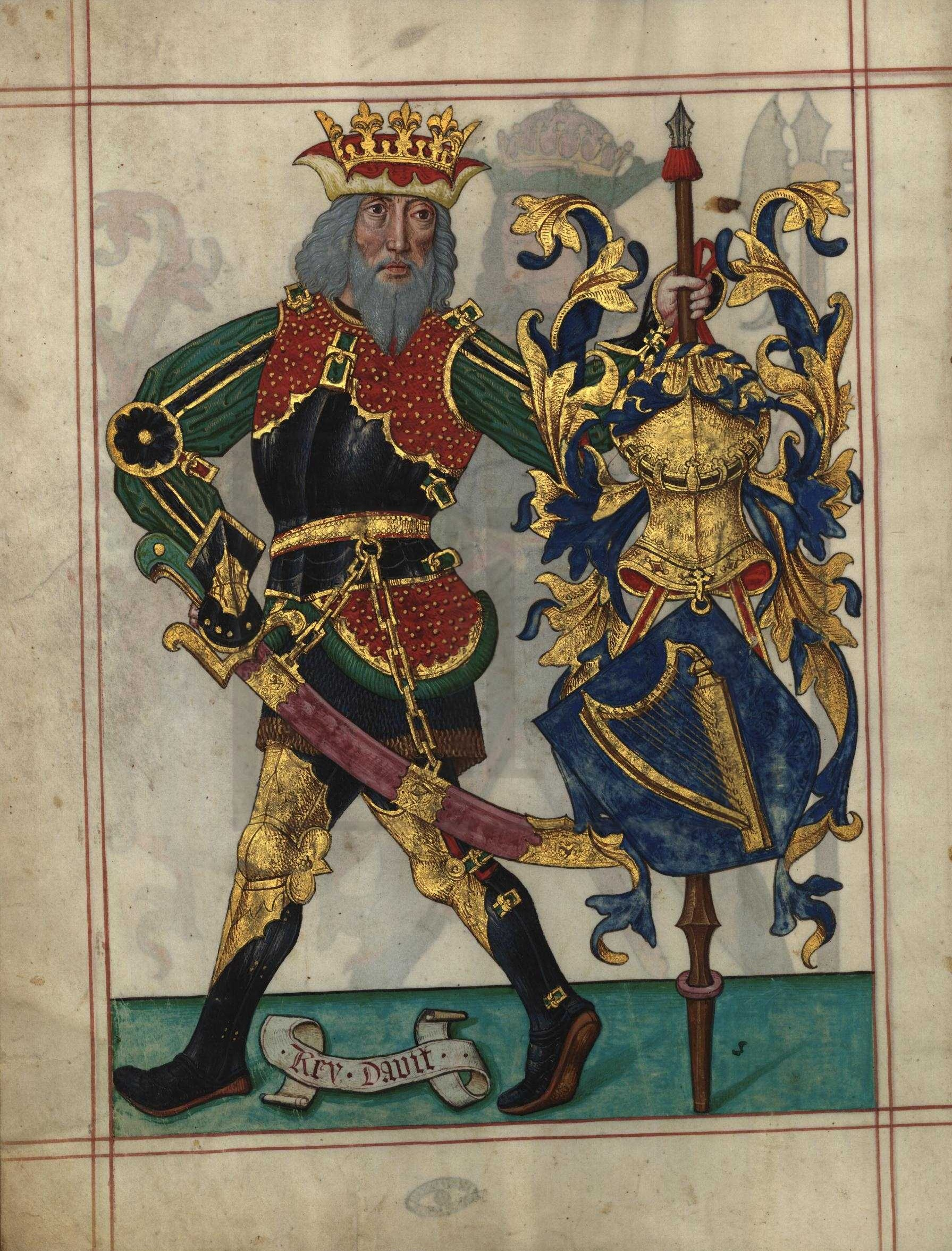
David, in Livro do Armeiro-Mor (fl 1^{v}), a Portuguese armorial from 1509. The book opens with ten full-page illustrations of the Nine Worthies and Bertrand du Guesclin.

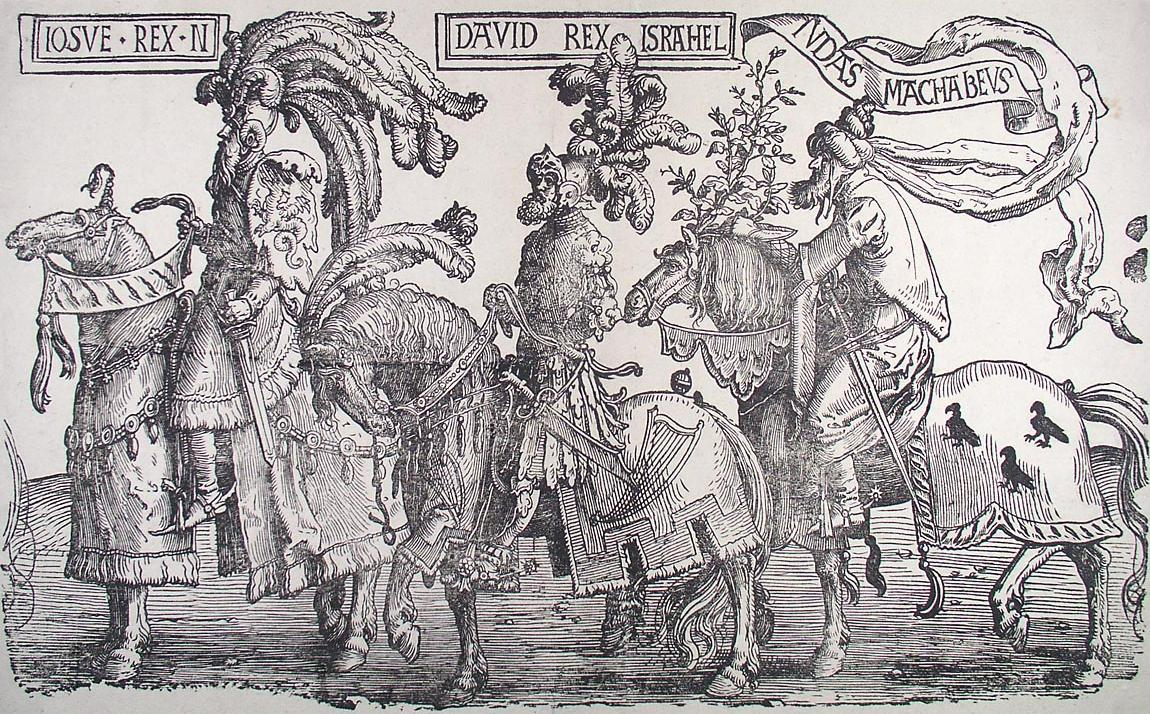
Lucas van Leyden's depiction of the three Old Testament kings as exotic contemporaries, in an engraving of c. 1520 depicting the Worthies in three sections

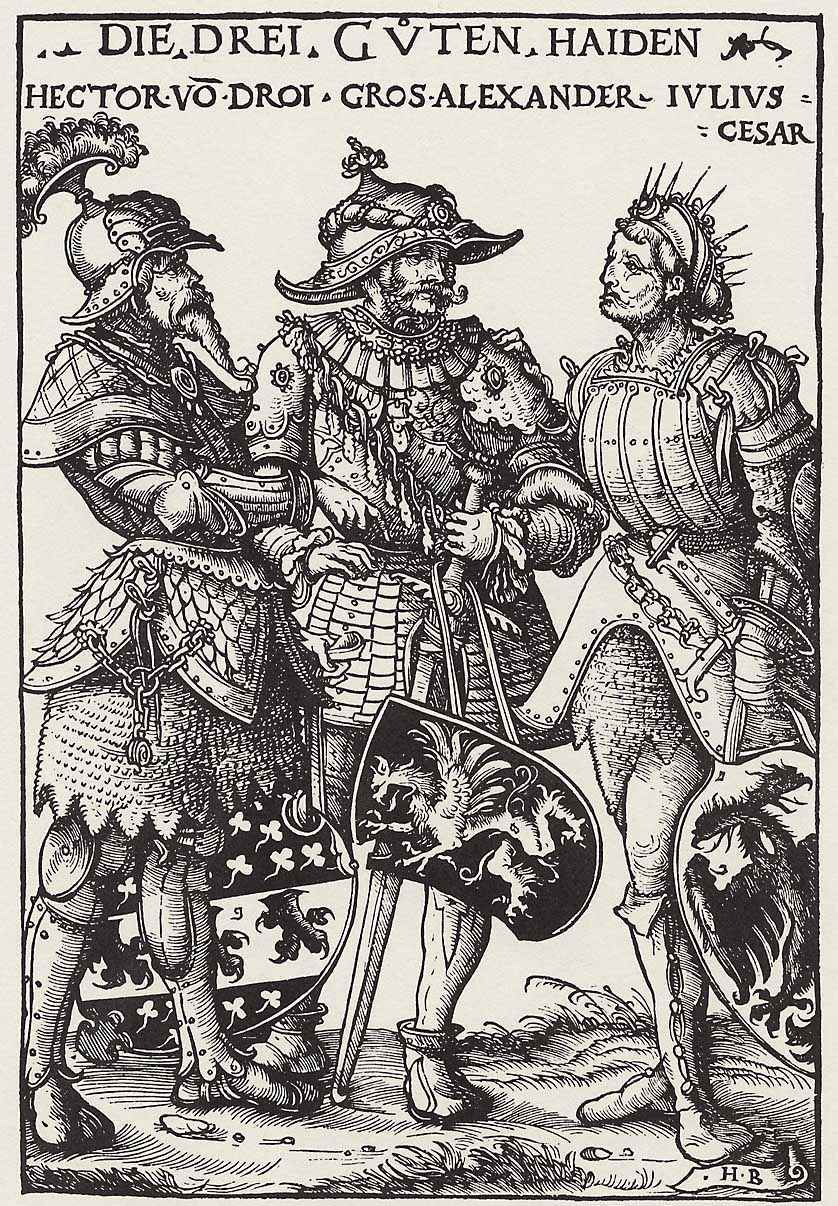
The Three Good Pagans: Hector, Alexander the Great, Julius Caesar, from the woodcut series by Hans Burgkmair, 1519

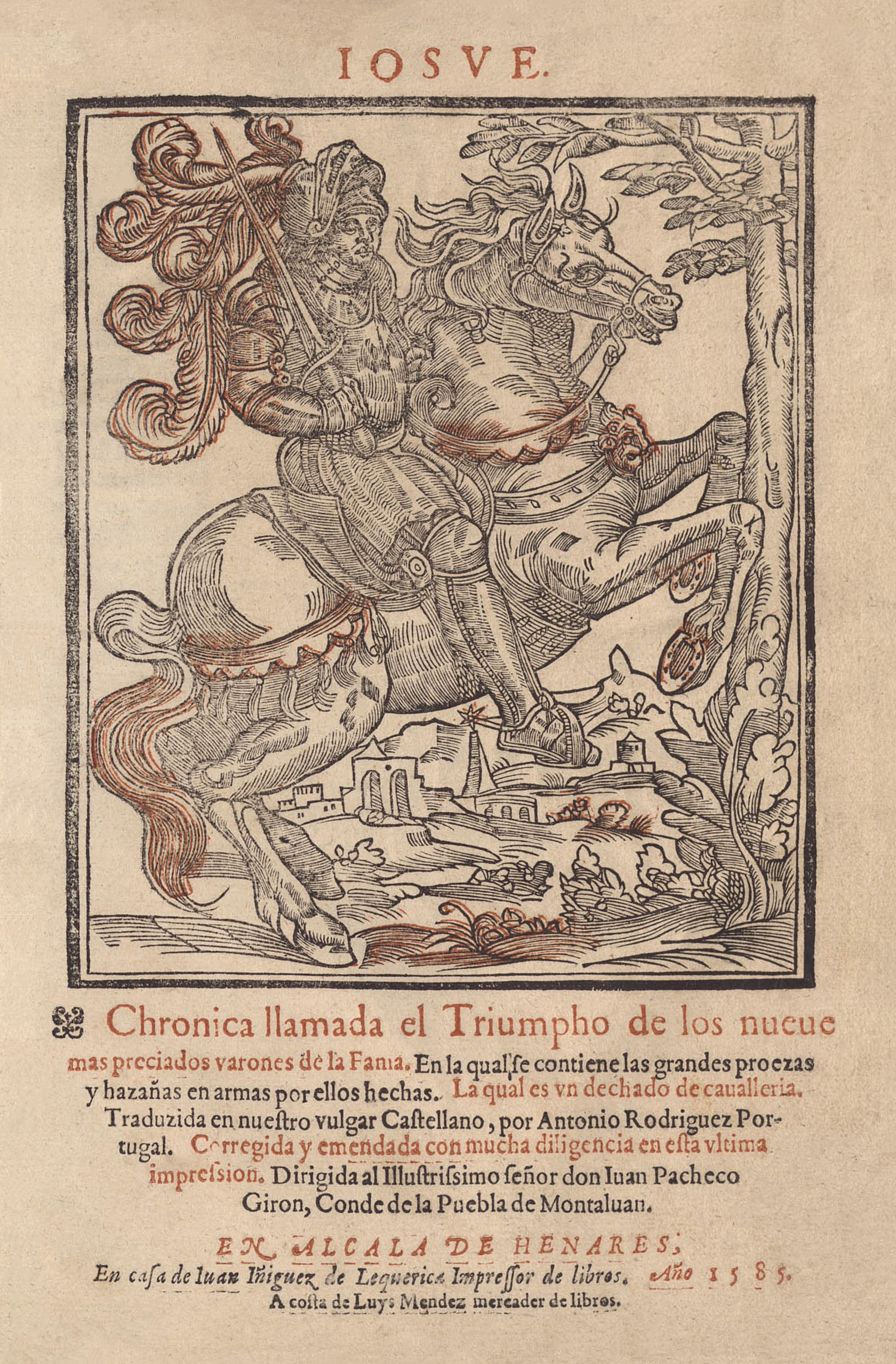
Nine Worthies (Alcalá de Henares, 1585)

They were first described in the early fourteenth century, by Jacques de Longuyon in his Voeux du Paon (1312). Their selection, as Johan Huizinga pointed out, betrays a close connection with the romance genre of chivalry. Neatly divided into a triad of triads, these men were considered to be paragons of chivalry within their particular traditions, whether Pagan, Jewish, or Christian. Longuyon's choices soon became a common theme in the literature and art of the Middle Ages and earned a permanent place in the popular consciousness. The medieval "craving for symmetry" engendered female equivalents, the neuf preuses, who were sometimes added, though the women chosen varied. Eustache Deschamps selected "a group of rather bizarre heroines" selected from fiction and history, among them Penthesilea, Tomyris, Semiramis. Literature and suites of tapestry featured the full complement of eighteen, whose allegorical figures preceded King Henry VI of England in his triumphal royal entry to Paris, 1431. A "tenth worthy" was added by Deschamps, in the figure of Bertrand du Guesclin, the Breton knight to whom France owed recovery from the battles of Crécy (1346) and Poitiers (1356). Francis I of France still occasionally paraded himself at court dressed in the "antique mode" to identify himself also as one of the Neuf Preux.

The 1459 Ingeram Codex presents the coat of arms of the Nine Worthies among a larger list of attributed arms of exemplary individuals, as the three "better Jews", "best pagans" and "best Christians" alongside the arms attributed to three heroes of King David (glossed as "the first coats of arms"), the Three Magi, the "three mildest princes", the "three worst tyrants" (Nebuchadnezzar, Antiochos Epiphanes and Nero), "three patient ones" (Alphonse the Wise, Job and Saint Eustachius), "three anointed kings" (France, Denmark and Hungary) and "three noble dynasties" (Louis XI of France, called "Louis the Prudent" as Dauphin, Ladislaus I of Hungary, and Otto III, Duke of Brunswick-Lüneburg of the House of Welf).

== Classification ==
The Nine Worthies comprise a triad of triads as follows:

=== Pagans ===
- Hector
- Alexander the Great
- Julius Caesar

=== Jews ===
- Joshua
- David
- Judah Maccabee

=== Christians ===
- King Arthur
- Charlemagne
- Godfrey of Bouillon

== Cultural references ==
=== Literature ===
The Nine Worthies were also a popular subject for masques in Renaissance Europe. In William Shakespeare's play Love's Labour's Lost the comic characters attempt to stage such a masque, but it descends into chaos. The list of Worthies actually named in the play include two not on the original list, Hercules and Pompey the Great. Alexander, Judah Maccabee, and Hector also appear on stage before the show collapses into complete disorder. The worthies are also mentioned in Henry IV, Part 2 in which Doll Tearsheet is so impressed by Falstaff's bravery in fighting Ancient Pistol that she says he is "as valorous as Hector of Troy, worth five of Agamemnon, and ten times better than the Nine Worthies".

Don Quixote evokes the Nine Worthies in Volume I, Chapter 5, telling a peasant (who is trying to get him to admit who he is) "I know that I may be not only those I have named, but all the Twelve Peers of France and even all the Nine Worthies, since my achievements surpass all that they have done all together and each of them on his own account".

=== Art ===
The Nine Worthies had not devolved to folk culture even in the seventeenth century, for a frieze of the Nine Worthies, contemporary with Shakespeare's comedy, was painted at the outset of the seventeenth century at North Mymms Place, Hertfordshire, an up-to-date house built by the Coningsby family, 1599.

The Cloisters, in New York City, has important portions of an early 15th-century tapestry series illustrating the surviving five of the Nine Worthies: King Arthur, Joshua, David, Hector, and Julius Caesar.

I Nove Prodi, a fresco by the Maestro del Castello della Manta, an anonymous master, painted c. 1420 in the sala baronale of the Castello della Manta, Saluzzo, Italy. The series also includes depictions of their female counterparts.

Montacute House has sculptures of the Nine Worthies spaced along the upper eastern façade on the exterior of the long gallery piers. These figures are dressed in Roman armour.

== Nine Worthy Women ==
In the late fourteenth century, Lady Worthies began to accompany the Nine Worthies, though usually not individualized and shown as anonymous Amazon-styled warriors. In later years, nine of the "Most Illustrious Ladies of All Ages and Nations" were chosen from scripture, history and legend to be placed alongside their male counterparts, though the choices for the Lady Worthies were not usually standardized and often varied by region, author and artist.

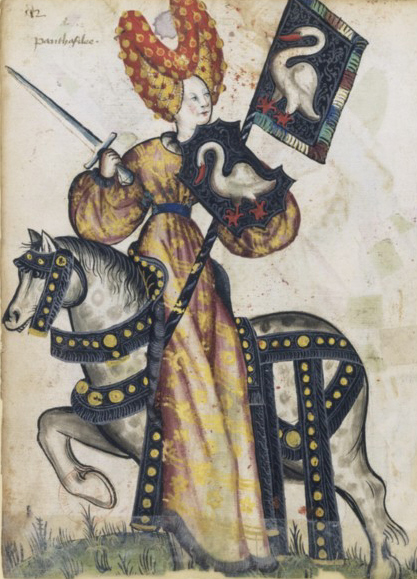
Penthesilea as one of the Lady Worthies

Eustache Deschamps added neuf preuses (women) to the list of neuf preux, including Penthesilea, Tomyris, and Semiramis. Together with their male counterparts, they precede Henry VI as he enters Paris in 1431, and figure in Le Jouvencel (1466). The list of preuses was however less fixed, and not always structured in pagan, Jewish and Christian triads. Thomas III of Saluzzo has: Deiphille, Synoppe, Hippolyte, Menalyppe, Semiramis, Lampetho, Thamarys, Teuta, Penthésilée. By conrast, the anonymous 15th Century work Triomphe des Neuf Preux lists Deborah, Judith, Esther, Susanna, Lucretia, Boudica, Mariamne, Clotilde, and "Andegona" (possibly Antigone).

A very fine set of Siennese fifteenth century panel paintings, attributed to the Master of the Griselda Legend and others, now incomplete and widely dispersed, showed male and female worthies - the remaining paintings were reunited in a 2007 exhibition at the National Gallery, London.

In the German Renaissance, Hans Burgkmair made a set of six woodcuts, each showing three of the "Eighteen Worthies". In addition to the usual males, his prints showed the Pagan Lucretia, Veturia and Virginia, the Jewish Esther, Judith and Jael, and the Christian Saints Helena, Bridget of Sweden and Elizabeth of Hungary. Burgkmair was in touch with Augsburg Renaissance Humanist circles, who may have helped choose the group. Apart from Veturia, mother of Coriolanus, who tried to save Rome from defeat by her son, the other pagan two were examples of chastity, responsible for no heroic acts except their defence of their own virtue. In contrast, two of the Jewish women, Judith and Jael, are known for their personal assassination of leaders opposed to Israel. Judith carries a sword in one hand and Holofernes's severed head in the other, and Jael carries the mallet with which she hammered a peg in the head of Sisera. The "Power of Women" and female violence was an interest of German artists at the time, and Lucas van Leyden, Albrecht Altdorfer and others made prints of Jael in the act.

The Christian trio of saints, all very popular in Germany at the time, are all women who had been married - Bridget became an abbess as a widow. In addition, like three of the male worthies, Elizabeth of Hungary was an ancestor of Burgkmair's patron Maximilian I, Holy Roman Emperor, and Helena was a Roman Empress. Unlike the other two groups, who all face each other, apparently in conversation, these three all look down, and may illustrate the female virtue of silence. Burgkmair's conception was not widely followed. For example, in Elizabethan and Jacobean England, the lists took on a significantly more Anglocentric slant. In his 1586 book The Blazon of Gentrie, John Feare names Minerva, Semiramis, and Tomyris for the Pagans, Jael, Deborah, and Judith for the Jews, and Maud, Elizabeth of Aragon, and Joanna of Naples (probably Joanna II) for the Christians. By contrast, Thomas Heywood's The Exemplary Lives and memorable Acts of Nine of the Most Worthy Women of the World: Three Jews. Three Gentiles. Three Christians (1640) introduced Boudica, Penthesilea, and Artemisia for the Pagans, and Elphleda, Margaret, and Elizabeth for the Christians. With the Jewish heroines, Fearne and Heywood are almost identical, with the only difference being that Heywood chose Esther over Jael.

== Nine Worthies of London ==
Nine Worthies of London is a book by Richard Johnson, written in 1592, which borrows the theme from the Nine Worthies. The book is subtitled Explaining the Honourable Excise of Armes, the Vertues of the Valiant, and the Memorable Attempts of Magnanimous Minds; Pleasaunt for Gentlemen, not unseemly for Magistrates, and most profitable for Prentises, celebrated the rise of nine famous Londoners through society from the ranks of apprentices or commoners.

The nine were Sir William Walworth, Sir Henry Pritchard, Sir Thomas White, Sir William Sevenoke, Sir John Hawkwood, Sir John Bonham, Christopher Croker, Sir Henry Maleverer of Cornhill, and Sir Hugh Calverley.

The term "Nine Worthies" was later used to refer to nine of the privy councillors of William III: Devonshire, Dorset, Monmouth, Edward Russell, Carmarthen, Pembroke, Nottingham, Marlborough, and Lowther.

== See also ==
- Iconography of Charlemagne
- Seven Champions of Christendom
- Virtuous pagan
