= Battle of Zela (67 BC) =

Battle of the Third Mithridatic War

Coordinates: 40°18′N 35°53′E

- Part of Third Mithridatic War
Date	67 BC
Location	near Zela, modern day Zile, Tokat, Turkey
Result	Armenian–Pontic victory

Belligerents
Kingdom of Pontus; Kingdom of Armenia	Roman Republic

Commanders and leaders
Mithridates VI of Pontus (WIA)	Gaius Valerius Triarius (WIA)

Strength
Unknown, but a considerable force of cavalry	2 legions and an unknown number of auxiliaries and allied troops

Casualties and losses
Unknown	7,000 men 24 tribunes 150 centurions

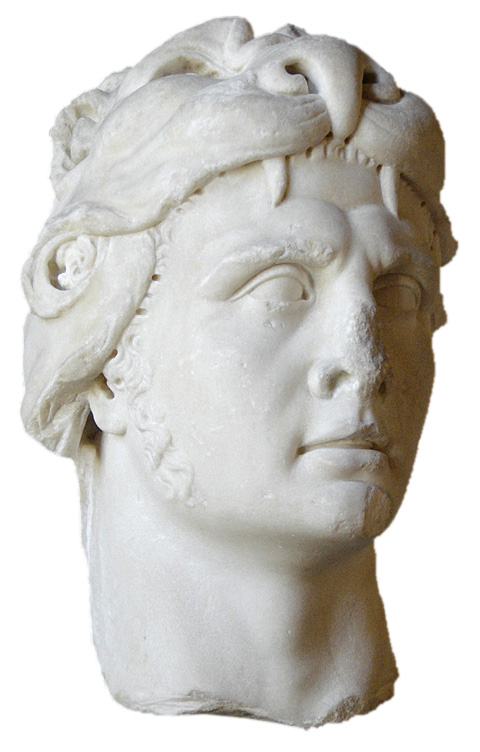
Portrait of the king of Pontus Mithridates VI as Heracles. Marble, Roman imperial period (1st century).

The Battle of Zela, not to be confused with the more famous battle in 47 BC, was fought in 67 BC near Zela in the Kingdom of Pontus. The battle resulted in a stunning Pontic victory and King Mithridates' successful reclamation of his kingdom. Mithridates' victory was short-lived however, as within a few years he would be completely defeated by Pompey the Great.

== Background ==
Between 88 BC and 63 BC the Roman Republic fought three wars with Mithridates VI of Pontus. For the third of these Mithridatic Wars, the Romans sent Lucius Licinius Lucullus and Marcus Aurelius Cotta, the consuls of 74 BC, to fight the king of Pontus. At the start of the war Cotta was defeated and became trapped in the city of Chalcedon. His colleague Lucullus came to his rescue and defeated Mithridates during the siege of Cyzicus. Lucullus then took the war into Pontus and eventually all the way up into Armenia where he defeated Mithridates' son-in-law and ally King Tigranes II of Armenia (see: Battle of Tigranocerta and Battle of Artaxata). Unfortunately for Lucullus his army forced him to turn back and they marched into Pontus again. Lucullus then convinced the bulk of his army to join him in a campaign in northern Mesopotamia which was far more hospitable. The Romans thought they had finally defeated Mithridates and never expected him to launch an invasion into Pontus.

== Prelude ==
In the spring of 67 BC most Roman troops had left Pontus for northern Mesopotamia, where Lucullus was laying siege to Nisibis, a treasure city of Tigranes. The two long-serving Valerian legions, tired of campaigning, had refused to leave and fell easy prey to a vengeful Mithridates who suddenly returned from exile in Armenia. The Romans had not expected Mithridates to strike at them in Pontus and he caught several small Roman detachments unaware. Marcus Fabius Hadrianus, whom Lucullus had left in command of Pontus, resorted to arming slaves to fight alongside his legionnaires and auxiliaries to scrape together a sizeable defence force. Hadrianus tried to defeat Mithridates in battle, but the Pontic forces routed his forces. The Romans lost 500 men and Hadrianus had no choice but to retreat. Mithridates tried to take Hadrianus' camp but was wounded twice, once in the face with an arrow or dart and then hit on the knee by a stone, probably fired by a sling. He recovered in a few days. Hadrianus sent out desperate messengers to his commander, Lucullus, in Mesopotamia, and to his fellow legate, Gaius Valerius Triarius, who was nearby bringing two legions to reinforce Lucullus. Triarius arrived first, reinforcing Hadrianus and assuming command of the combined army. Mithridates pulled his forces back towards Comana and awaited the Romans.

== Battle ==
Plutarch and Appian claim Triarius wanted to defeat Mithridates before Lucullus could arrive and take the glory for himself, but this is in dispute. The battle took place on a plain near Zela, and was a Roman attempt to regain control of the situation in Pontus. It was preceded by a freak tornado, which both sides interpreted the omen as a call to a final, decisive battle. The Romans under Triarius marched on Mithridates's camp, but since he had prepared the battlefield, he marched out and met them on the plain. Mithridates first threw his entire force against one section of the advancing enemy and defeated them while holding off the rest. He then rode his cavalry round the rear of the remaining force and broke them too. The fight was long and brutal but eventually the Mithridatic troops drove the Romans back into a trench Mithridates had constructed in preparation for the battle and had then flooded to conceal it from sight. Many Romans became trapped against this unexpected obstacle and were cut down in great numbers. The trench was soon "clogged with dead Romans". Mithridates was critically wounded again, and once again a shaman by the name of Agari healed the king with snake venom. Only hours after the near-fatal wound, Mithridates was back in his saddle. By this time, the Romans had already fled, leaving 7,000 dead, including 24 tribunes and 150 centurions.

During the chaos of battle a Roman centurion found himself close to Mithridates, who evidently took him for one of the Romans in his entourage. The man ran up to the king as though delivering a message and stabbed him in the thigh, probably the only accessible point where Mithridates could be wounded, since he was armoured Armenian-style (see: Cataphract). The would-be killer was promptly cut down by Mithridates' bodyguards but the damage was done. The entire Mithridatic army came to a disconcerted halt. Fortunately, the king's physician (a Greek called Timotheus) was near and after a quick examination ordered him lifted above the throng of worried followers, so that they could see that their leader still lived. Not only was he alive but he was furious that the pursuit of the Romans had been halted. Triarius and what was left of his men had not even attempted to defend their camp and had kept on running.

== Aftermath ==
The remaining Roman forces fled to Lucullus, who had marched up from Mesopotamia. Lucullus wanted to march on Mithridates to finally finish him off but his troops refused to advance a further step. They were tired of constant campaigning with little profit. They threw their purses at Lucullus's feet as he was the only one making a personal profit of this war and told him to continue on his own. Since his army refused to march on Mithridates, Lucullus withdrew to Galatia leaving Mithridates to reclaim Pontus. In 66 BC Pompey arrived in Galatia, having been given the command against Mithridates and would finish what Lucullus had started.

== Modern sources ==
- Philip Matyszak, Mithridates the Great, Rome's Indomitable Enemy.
- Lee Fratantuono, Lucullus, the life and campaigns of a Roman Conqueror.

== Ancient sources ==
- Plutarch, Life of Lucullus, 35.
- Appian, Mithridatica, 89.
- Cassius Dio, Roman History, 36.12.
