= Sulpicia (wife of Quintus Fulvius Flaccus) =

Roman matron outstanding for sexual integrity

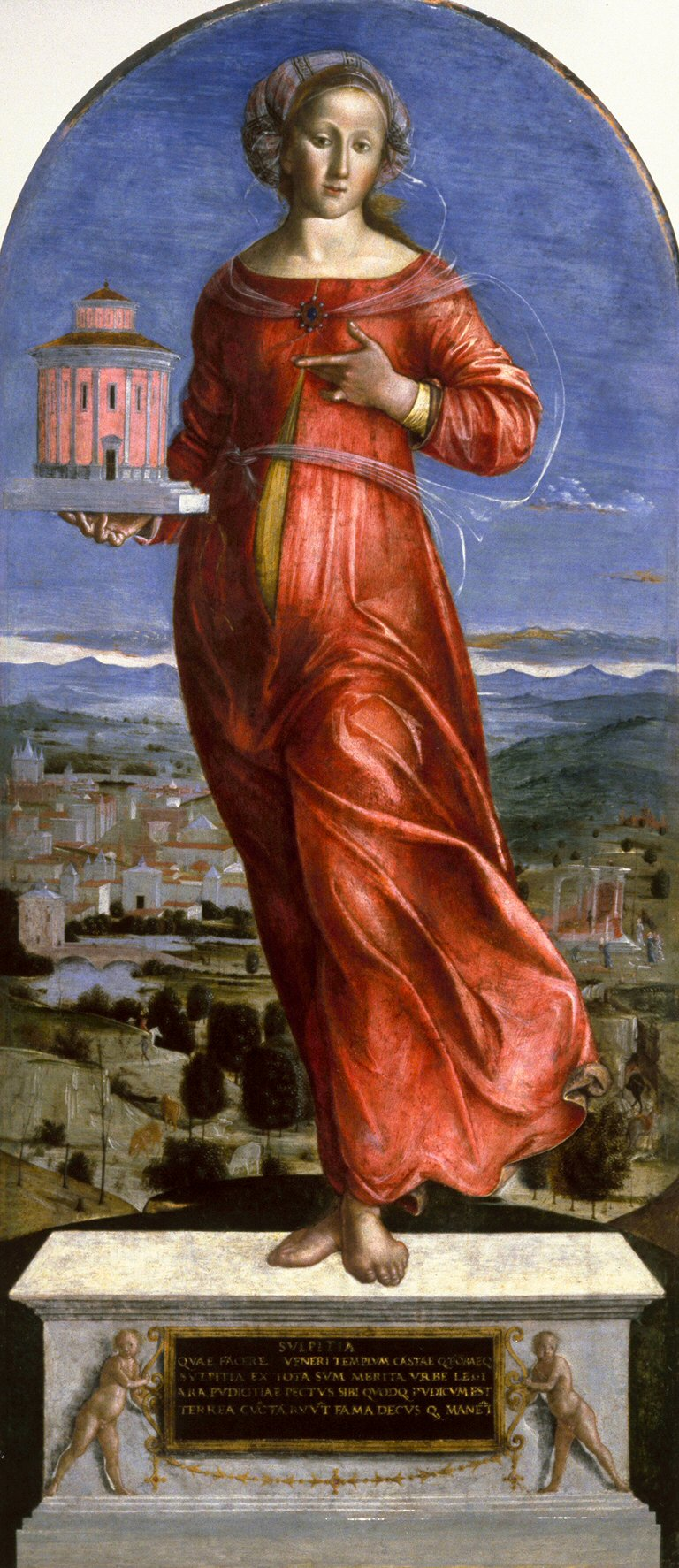
Sulpitia by Pietro Orioli (Walters Art Museum)

Sulpicia (fl. late 3rd century BC) was an ancient Roman woman whose outstanding sexual integrity (pudicitia) earned her the honor of instituting the cult of Venus Verticordia.

== Historicity ==
The historicity of Sulpicia is generally accepted, though doubted by T. P. Wiseman, who regarded her as legendary. She was the daughter of a Paterculus, possibly Servius Sulpicius Paterculus or his brother, the Gaius Sulpicius Paterculus who was consul in 258 BC. Her husband is identified as the four-time consul Quintus Fulvius Flaccus.

Historical or not, she served as an exemplar of Roman female morality that could be invoked in particular to the credit of women from the gens Sulpicia. During the investigation that led to the scandal and suppression of the Bacchanals in 186 BC, a Sulpicia touted as a gravis femina (a "serious woman" or moral "heavyweight") played a role in investigating the legitimacy of the claims and the character of the participants. If the statue of Venus Verticordia was dedicated during Flaccus's last consulship (209 BC), it's possible that the same Sulpicia was playing the role of elder stateswoman as a widow.

== Statue dedication ==
The cult of Venus Verticordia has two founding narratives, first the installation of a statue in the last 3rd century BC, during the time of the Second Punic War, and then the building of a temple in 114 BC. Sulpicia became an emblem of excellence as the woman who earned the honor of dedicating the statue. She is one of the few women Valerius Maximus features in his catalog of worthies.

The Punic Wars (264–146 BC) were a time of social upheaval for the Romans, and as women of the propertied classes stepped in to manage domestic matters in the absence of men deployed continually at war, their position in society was renegotiated through both legislation and religious cultivation. The form of marriage cum manu, which placed a wife under the paternal power or in the control (manus, literally "hand") of her husband, declined. Anxieties about women with more agency and at greater liberty were often mediated through the articulation of standards of conduct, particularly the virtue of pudicitia, and new or theologically reinterpreted religious practices. Violations of the sexual and religious purity (castitas) of the Vestals were detected, and married women of the respectable classes (matronae) were investigated and sometimes prosecuted for criminal debauchery. Prodigies were identified, and expiations prescribed by the state priests, sometimes in consultation with the Sibylline books. These expiations often called for the establishment of women-centered cults, but the circumstances that led to the need for a new image of Venus (simulacrum) in the form of Verticordia are not recorded.

Pliny the Elder implies that it was the first time a woman who was not a priestess was charged with carrying out an official religious task on behalf of the state, and sees Sulpicia as a precedent for Claudia Quinta, who was granted a similar responsibility when the cult of Magna Mater was imported to Rome.

Since the statue predates the temple by over a hundred years, it must originally have been dedicated at a site such as the Temple of Venus Erycina on the Capitoline or at the Temple of Venus Obsequens.

== The Sulpicia of the Italian Renaissance ==
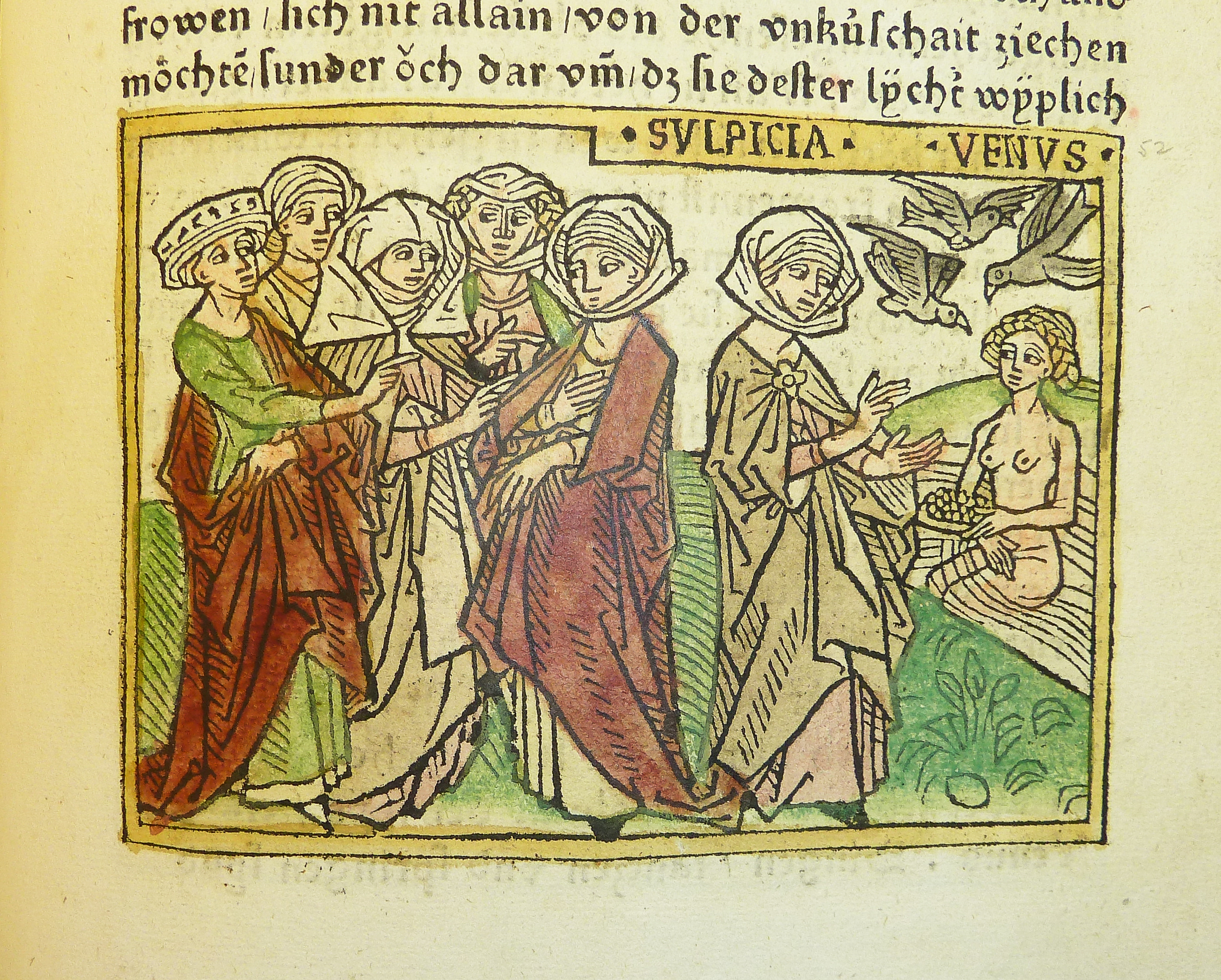
Sulpicia honoring Venus, rising from inland water rather than the sea, in a woodcut illustration from a 1474 German translation of De mulieribus claris

In the Italian Renaissance, the story appears in Boccaccio's book De mulieribus claris ("On Illustrious Women") (1361–1362). The Sulpicia of Boccaccio is, paradoxically, outstanding primarily for being unobtrusive. Her virtues are described in terms of "denial and restraint". She is the model wife who confines her interests to the household and avoids gossip, dinner parties, dancing, cosmetics, and perfume. She speaks only when spoken to, and in Christian manner submits to sex with her husband only blushingly and for the sake of procreation. Even her gaze is constrained, allowed to wander no further than the edges of her own dress. Hers is one of only seventeen biographies of "good" wives among the total of 106 famous women Boccaccio sketches.

The painting Sulpitia by Orioli (1458–1496) is one of eight surviving panels thought to have been made to celebrate a wedding in 1493, (Note: Thought to have been that of Silvio di Bartolomeo Piccolomini, a relative of Pope Pius II; or the double wedding of the brothers Antonio and Giulio Spannocchi, the Spannocchi being a branch of the House of Piccolomini.) each depicting an ancient Roman who could serve as a moral example. Sulpicia holds a symbolic model of the goddess's temple, which was not built until at least century after her death, and stands before a view of the ancient city as imagined by Orioli. It is the only known work by Orioli that is not on a Christian theme. The Latin inscription on the pedestal (Note: Sulpitia quae facere Veneri templum castaeq[ue] probaeq[ue] Sulpitia ex tota sum merita urbe legi ara pudicitiae pectus sibi quodq[ue] pudicum est terrea cuncta ruut fama decusq[ue] manet (in all caps in the original)) erroneously identifies Sulpicia as the temple founder, with the moral "An altar of chastity (pudicitia) is that breast which is chaste unto itself. All earthly things fall into ruin; reputation and illustriousness remain."

== See also ==
- Gens Sulpicia

== Primary texts ==
- Valerius Maximus, Factorum ac Dictorum Memorabilium libri IX (Nine Books of Memorable Deeds and Sayings), Henry J. Walker, trans., Hackett Publishing Company, Indianapolis (2004), ISBN 0-87220-674-2.
- Gaius Plinius Secundus (Pliny the Elder), Naturalis Historia.
- Gaius Julius Solinus, De Mirabilis Mundi (The Wonders of the World).
- Giovanni Boccaccio, De mulieribus claris (On Famous Women), Virginia Brown, trans., Harvard University Press (2001), ISBN 0-674-01130-9.

== Sources ==
- Briscoe, John (2008). A Commentary on Livy Books 38–40. Oxford University Press.
- Edwards, Nancy (2008). "Penelope". In Bayer, Andrea (ed.). Art and Love in Renaissance Italy. Metropolitan Museum of Art. pp. 311–312.
- Fantham, Elaine (2011). Roman Readings: Roman Response to Greek Literature from Plautus to Statius and Quintilian. De Gruyter.
- Kanter, Laurence B. (1988). "Pietro Orioli". In Christiansen, Keith (ed.). Painting in Renaissance Siena 1420–1500. Metropolitan Museum of Art. pp. 334–339.
- Kraemer, Rose Shepard (1992). Her Share of the Blessings: Women's Religions among Pagans, Jews, and Christians in the Greco-Roman World. Oxford University Press.
- Langlands, Rebecca (2006). Sexual Morality in Ancient Rome. Cambridge University Press.
- McLeod, Glenda (1991). Virtue and Venum: Catalogs of Women from Antiquity to the Renaissance. University of Michigan Press.
- Mignone, Lisa Marie (2016). The Republican Aventine and Rome's Social Order. University of Michigan Press.
- Richardson Jr., Lawrence (1992). A New Topographical Dictionary of Ancient Rome. Johns Hopkins University Press. ISBN 9780801843006.
- Schultz, Celia E. (2006). Women's Religious Activity in the Roman Republic. University of North Carolina Press.
- Walters Art Museum. "Sulpicia". Online Collection accession number 37.616.
