= W. S. Watt =

William Smith Watt, FBA (20 June 1913 Harthill – 23 December 2002) was a British Latin scholar.

He was fellow and tutor in classics at Balliol College from 1938 to 1952. He was Regius Professor of Humanity at the University of Aberdeen from 1952 to 1979.
