= Sempronia (wife of Decimus Brutus) =

Roman aristocratic woman, wife of Decimus Brutus

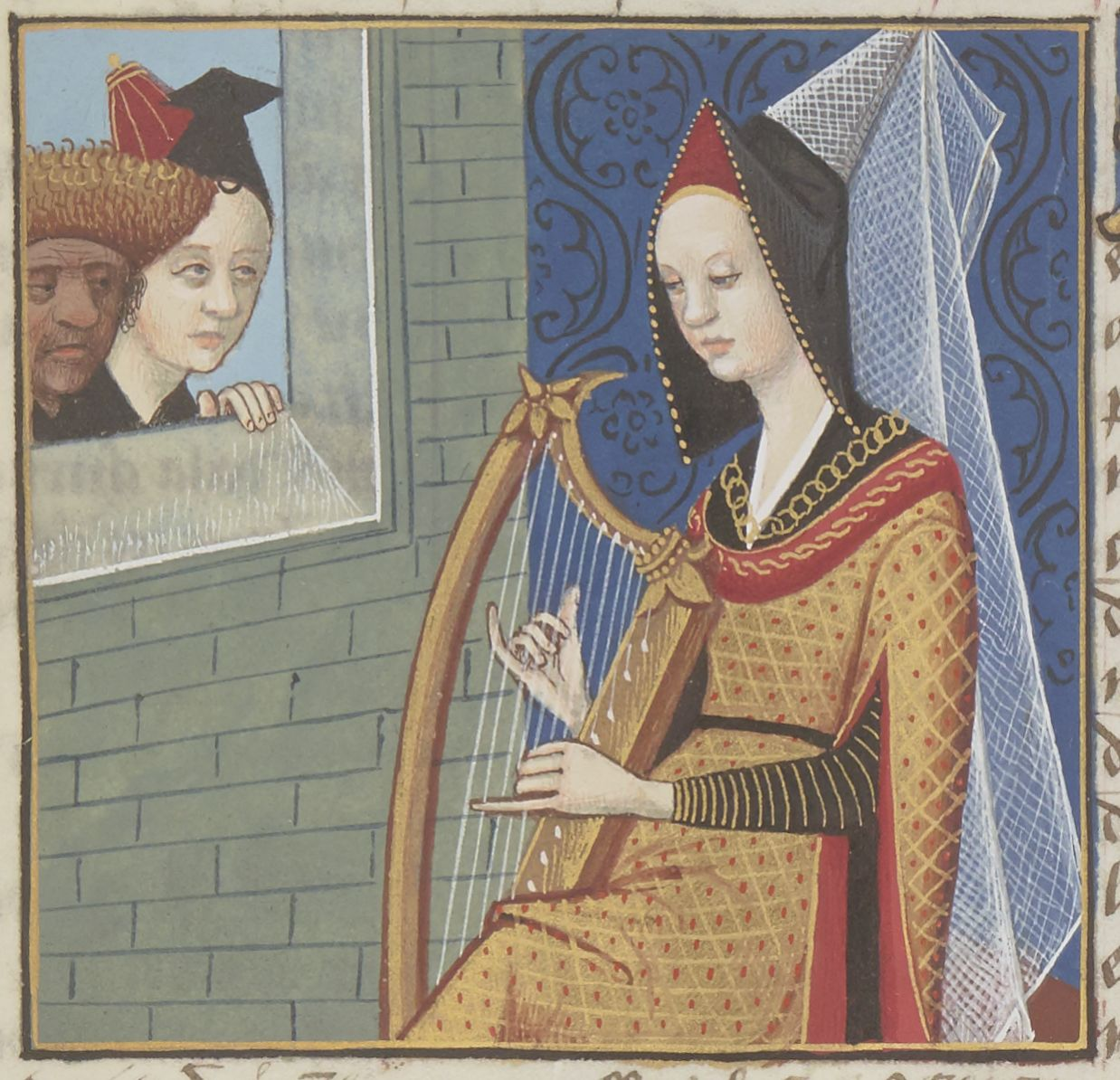
- Born: Rome
- Died: Rome
- Spouse: Decimus Junius Brutus
- Children: Decimus Junius Brutus Albinus (possibly)

Sempronia was an Ancient Roman woman of the late Republic who was the wife of Decimus Junius Brutus, the consul of 77 BC, and step-mother of his son Decimus Junius Brutus Albinus who became one of Julius Caesar's assassins.

== Biography ==
=== Early life ===
It has been speculated that she may have been the daughter of Gaius Gracchus, although historian Erich Gruen considers this unlikely. Others instead believes that she was the sister of Fulvia's mother Sempronia, but this is unsure as well. A third option put forward is that she could have been the daughter of Gaius Sempronius Tuditanus, the consul of 129 BC.

=== Adult life ===
Sempronia was described as a distinguished, witty, beautiful, accomplished, and passionate woman, who spoke Greek and Latin. She could sing, play the lyre and dance very well. The historian Sallust states she was extremely fortunate in life, marriage, and children, yet had a profligate character. According to him she had "masculine daring" and involved herself in politics. Without the knowledge or consent of her husband, she participated in the conspiracy of Catiline and allowed the conspirators to meet in her home to plan. Sempronia and women like her represented a "new woman" in Rome, with abilities and interests that would become common for women of Rome in later years, a contrast to classical Roman women like Cornelia who stood for values from the earlier Republican period. She was said to have had many male lovers and Sallust stated that she "sought out men more than she was sought out by them".

Sempronia knew Julius Caesar and was likely one of his mistresses. Her step-son Decimus Albinus has been considered as one of Caesar's potential illegitimate children and it is likely Caesar knew them well.

== Research ==
In the past she has sometimes been conflated with another woman by the same name who was the sister of the Gracchi brothers.

Johann Caspar von Orelli supposed that this Sempronia may be the same Sempronia who, according to Asconius, gave testimony at the trial of Titus Annius Milo in 52 BC. This Sempronia was the daughter of a Sempronius Tuditanus, and supposedly the mother of Publius Clodius Pulcher. However, as Clodius' wife was Fulvia, the daughter of a Sempronia and granddaughter of Sempronius Tuditanus, it seems that she was not the same Sempronia who married Brutus, and that the woman witnessing was actually Clodius' mother-in-law, not mother.

== Cultural depictions ==
Sempronia is a focal character in a 1600s play by Ben Jonson, Catiline His Conspiracy.

She is the title character of the short story "The Consul's Wife" by Steven Saylor where she and her lover are plotting to have her husband murdered. She also appears in Saylor's novel Catilina's Riddle. In Saylor's works she is indeed depicted as the daughter of Gaius Gracchus, Saylor notes that he is aware that this is considered debatable among historians, but that he enjoys to speculate on the possibility due to it being interesting and fitting for her character, as the Gracchi were known for their rebellious nature.

Sempronia is mentioned, but does not appear, in the novel The October Horse and appears in Caesar's Women, by Colleen McCullough. In the novel Respublica: A Novel of Cicero's Roman Republic Sempronia is portrayed as a vile woman who murders her husband and mentally and sexually abuses her son Decimus. She is the point of view character in the novel Catilinas sammansvärjning by Göran Hägg. She plays a major part in the novel A Slave of Catiline by Paul Anderson. She is also a character in the novel The Roman Traitor by Henry William Herbert.

== See also ==
- Sempronia gens
- Women in ancient Rome
