= Aulus Postumius Albinus =

Aulus Postumius Albinus may refer to:

- Aulus Postumius Albinus (consul 242 BC), Roman senator
- Aulus Postumius Albinus (consul 151 BC), Roman senator
- Aulus Postumius Albinus (consul 99 BC), Roman senator
- Aulus Postumius Albinus Luscus, Roman senator
- Aulus Postumius Albinus Regillensis, Roman senator
