= Timarete =

Ancient Greek painter

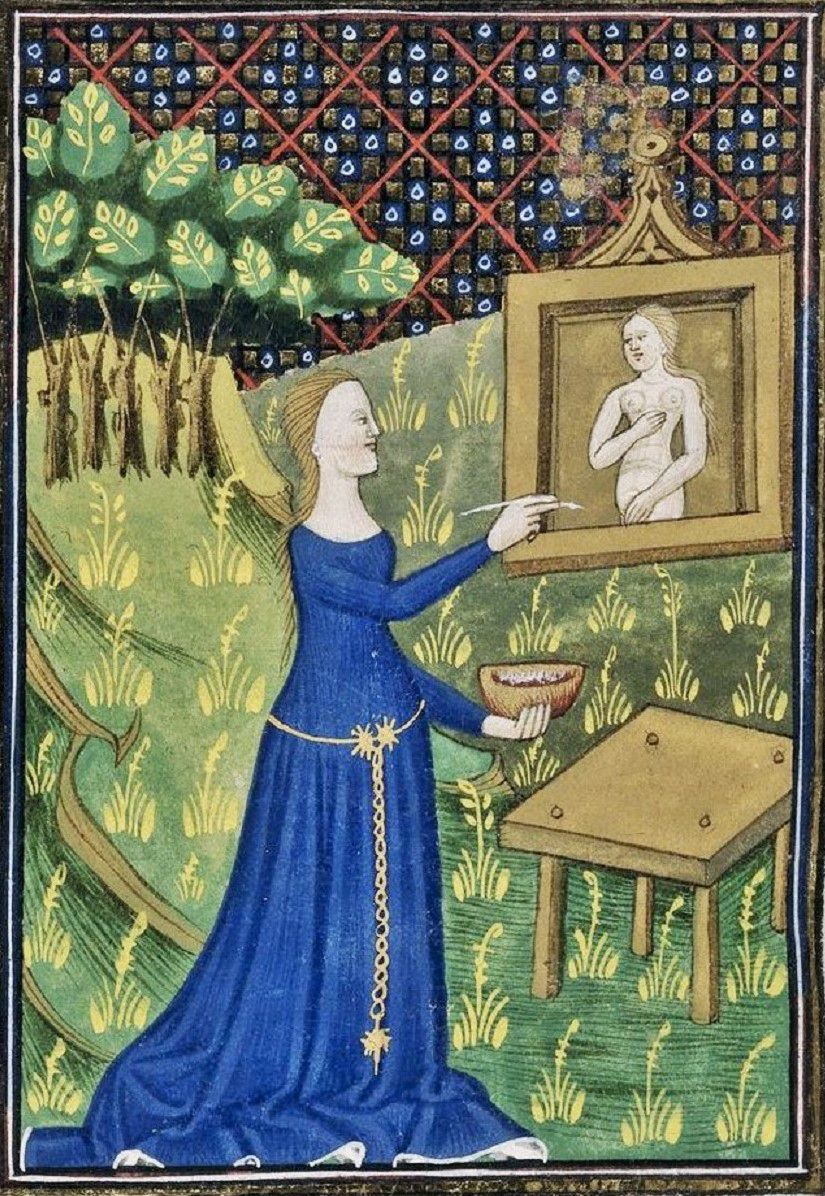
Detail of a miniature of Thamyris (Timarete) painting her picture of the goddess Diana, N. France,(Rouen) 15th century .

Timarete (Greek: Τιμαρέτη) (or Thamyris, Tamaris, Thamar; 5th century BC), was an ancient Greek painter.

She was the daughter of the painter Micon the Younger of Athens. According to Pliny the Elder, she "scorned the duties of women and practised her father's art." At the time of Archelaus I of Macedon, she was best known for a panel painting of the goddess Diana that was kept at Ephesus, a city that was associated with the goddess. While it is no longer extant, it was kept at Ephesus for many years.

She is one of the six female artists of antiquity mentioned in Pliny the Elder's Natural History (XL.147–148) in A.D. 77: Timarete, Irene, Calypso, Aristarete, Iaia, Olympias.

== Primary sources ==
- Pliny the Elder, Naturalis historia xxxv.35.59, 40.147.

== Secondary sources ==
- Chadwick, Whitney. Women, Art, and Society. Thames and Hudson, London, 1990.
- Harris, Anne Sutherland and Linda Nochlin. Women Artists: 1550–1950. Los Angeles County Museum of Art, Knopf, New York, 1976.
