= Marpesia =

Legendary Queen of the Amazons

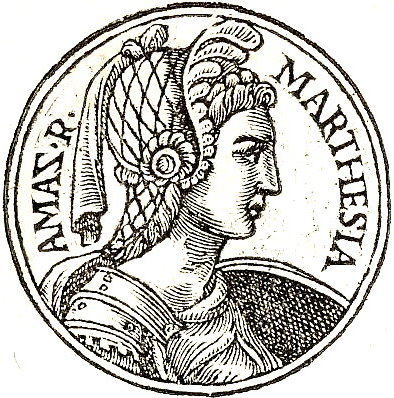
Marpesia from Promptuarium Iconum Insigniorum

In ancient Greek and Roman legendary history, Marpesia (Greek: Μαρπησία "Snatcher"; sometimes wrongly spelled Marthesia) was Queen of the Amazons with Lampedo ("burning torch"), her sister, as a co-ruler. They ruled with Hippo ("horse") after the death of Lysippe.

Marpesia was one of the rulers who helped establish the Greek city of Ephesus.

In Giovanni Boccaccio’s Famous Women, a chapter is dedicated to Lampedo and Marpesia.

== Bibliography ==
- Justinus Epitoma Historiarum philippicarum Pompei Trogi II.4.1-16
- Orosius Historiae adversus paganos I.15.1-6
- Giovanni Boccaccio’s Famous Women translated by Virginia Brown 2001, p. 25-27; Cambridge and London, Harvard University Press; ISBN 0-674-01130-9
