= De finibus bonorum et malorum =

Philosophical work on ethics by Cicero

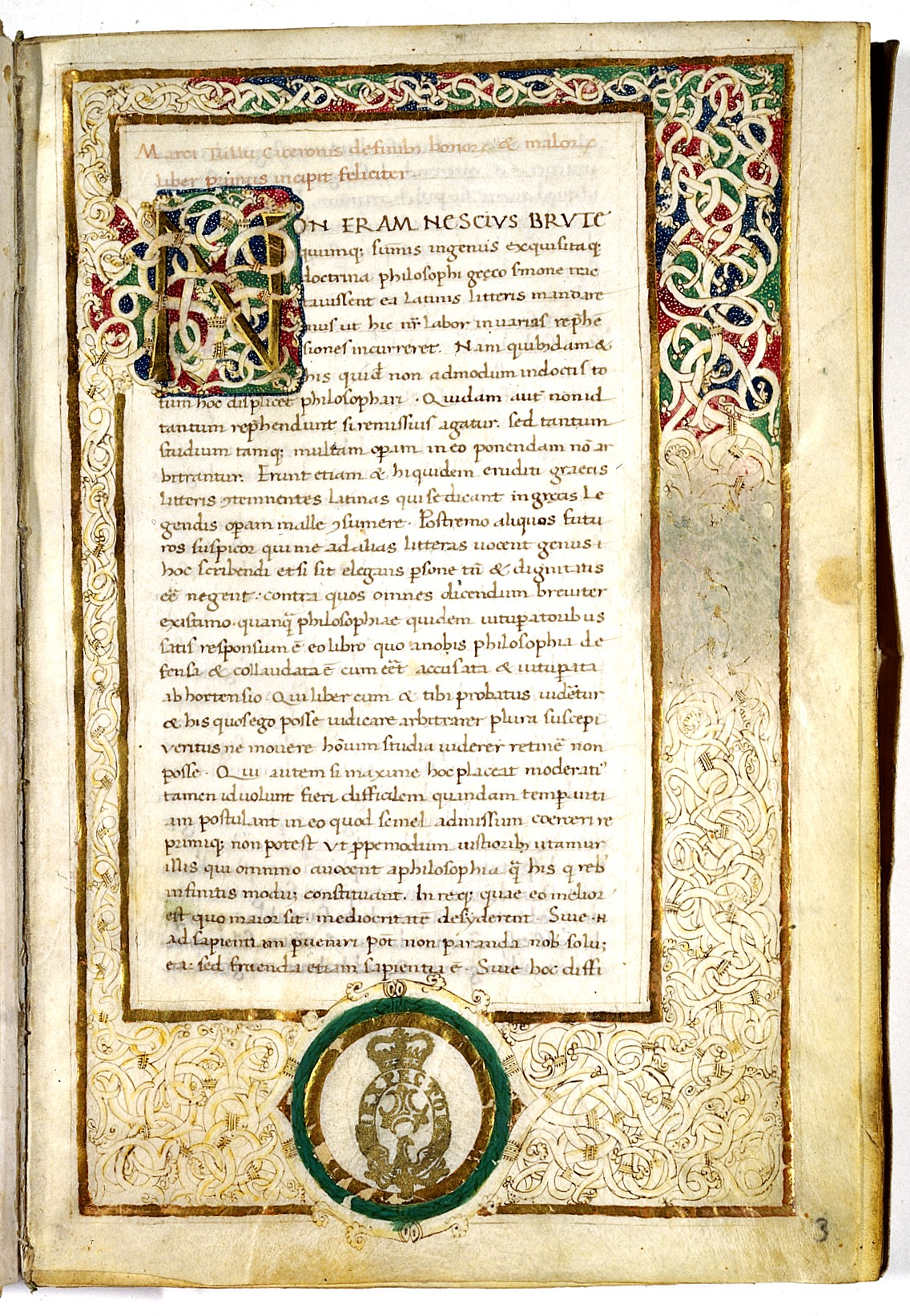
- De finibus bonorum et malorum
- Author: Cicero
- Language: Classical Latin
- Subject: Ethics
- Genre: Philosophy, dialogue
- Publication date: 45 BCE
- Publication place: Roman Republic
- Preceded by: Academica

De finibus bonorum et malorum ("On the ends of good and evil") is a Socratic dialogue by the Roman orator, politician, and Academic Skeptic philosopher Marcus Tullius Cicero. It consists of three dialogues, over five books, in which Cicero discusses the philosophical views of Epicureanism, Stoicism, and the Platonism of Antiochus of Ascalon (whose hybrid system mingled Stoicism with an "Old Academy" tradition of Platonism and Aristotelianism). The treatise is structured so that each philosophical system is described in its own book and then disputed in the following book (with exception of Antiochus' view which is both explained and disputed in book five). The book was developed in the summer of the year 45 BC, and was written over the course of about one and a half months. Together with the Tusculanae Quaestiones written shortly afterwards and the Academica, De finibus bonorum et malorum is one of the most extensive philosophical works of Cicero.

Cicero dedicated the book to Marcus Junius Brutus.

== Contents ==
=== First and second books (Liber Primus and Liber Secundus) ===
The first two books are a dialogue set at Cicero's home city of Cumae between himself and Lucius Manlius Torquatus, a young Epicurean, while another young Roman, Gaius Valerius Triarius, listens on. In the first book, the interlocutors present the Epicurean theory of hedonism, which holds that pleasure in the form of aponia (absence of pain) is regarded as the highest good. In the second book, Cicero criticizes this view, attacking the Epicurean definition of pleasure and arguing that it is inconsistent to hold pleasure as the absence of pain as the final good, since these are not one single good, but rather two distinct goods.

=== Third and fourth books (Liber Tertius and Liber Quartus) ===
In the next two books, Stoic ethics are discussed. In the third book, Cicero's interlocutor, Marcus Porcius Cato, presents Stoic doctrine. Here, Cicero introduces the technical terms used by the Stoics into Latin. The highest and only good of the Stoics is virtue (moral good). In the fourth book, Cicero casts doubt on this dogma, arguing a supposed natural state (the "cradle argument"), as well as issues regarding the exclusion of other goods entailed by Stoic doctrine.

=== Fifth book (Liber Quintus) ===
In the last book, Cicero presents in the form of a dialogue between himself and several friends the theory of eudaimonia taught by Antiochus of Ascalon, which treats Aristotelianism as a subgroup of Platonism. This theory includes both virtue and external goods as the highest good. At the end of the book, Cicero criticized logical inconsistencies of this teaching, but more briefly and only addressing details, not broader principles. Cicero then declares that he follows this school of thought, albeit not without reservations, while respecting the valuable aspects of the teachings presented in the previous books.

== Legacy ==
In graphic design, Lorem ipsum, a commonly used placeholder text, is based on De finibus. The placeholder text is taken from parts of the first book's discourse on Epicureanism. Words of the original text have been altered, added, and removed in Lorem ipsum, rendering it nonsensical as Latin.

== See also ==
- Summum bonum
