= Aristarete =

Ancient Greek painter

Aristarete or Aristareta (Ancient Greek: Ἀρισταρέτη) was an ancient Greek painter. Little is known about her, including where and when she lived.

Although none of her works are known to be extant, Pliny the Elder's Natural History mentions her work depicting Asclepius, the Greek god of medicine. Pliny includes Aristarete in a list of six ancient Greek female artists, among which Timarete, Irene, and Calypso.

Pliny also writes that Aristarete was trained by her father, Nearchos.

== Account by Pliny ==
The standard Teubner edition of Pliny the Elder's Natural History mentions the painter Aristarete in the following passage from the 147th chapter of its 35th book:

Pinxere et mulieres: Timarete, Miconis filia, Dianam, quae in tabula Ephesi est antiquissimae picturae; Irene, Cratini pictoris filia et discipula, puellam, quae est Eleusine, Calypso, senem et praestigiatorem Theodorum, Alcisthenen saltatorem; Aristarete, Nearchi filia et discipula, Aesculapium.
