= First French War of Religion (1562–1563) =

French religious civil war

- Part of the French Wars of Religion
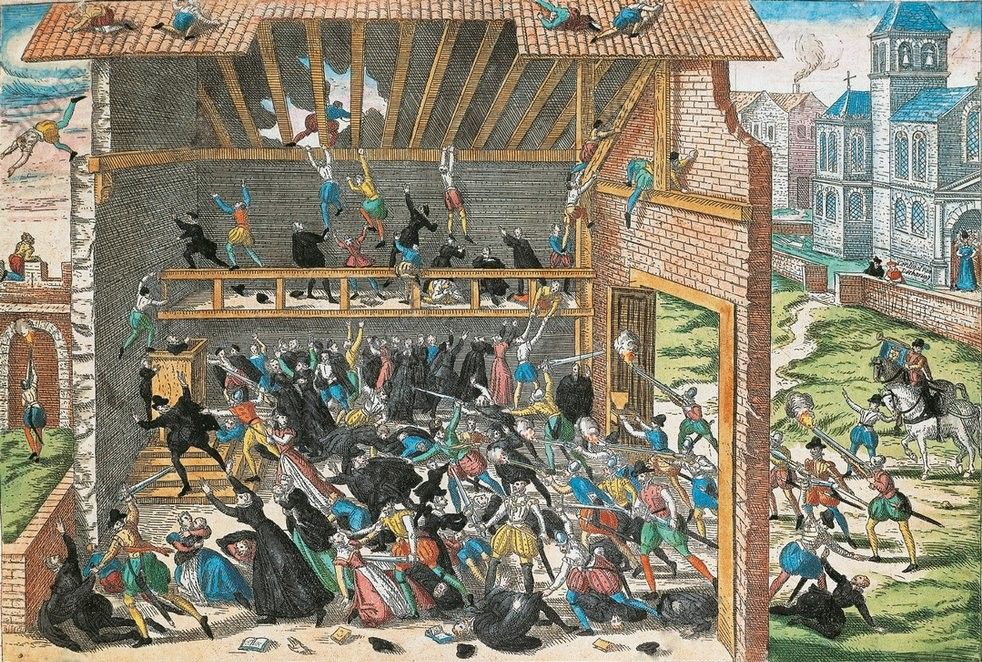
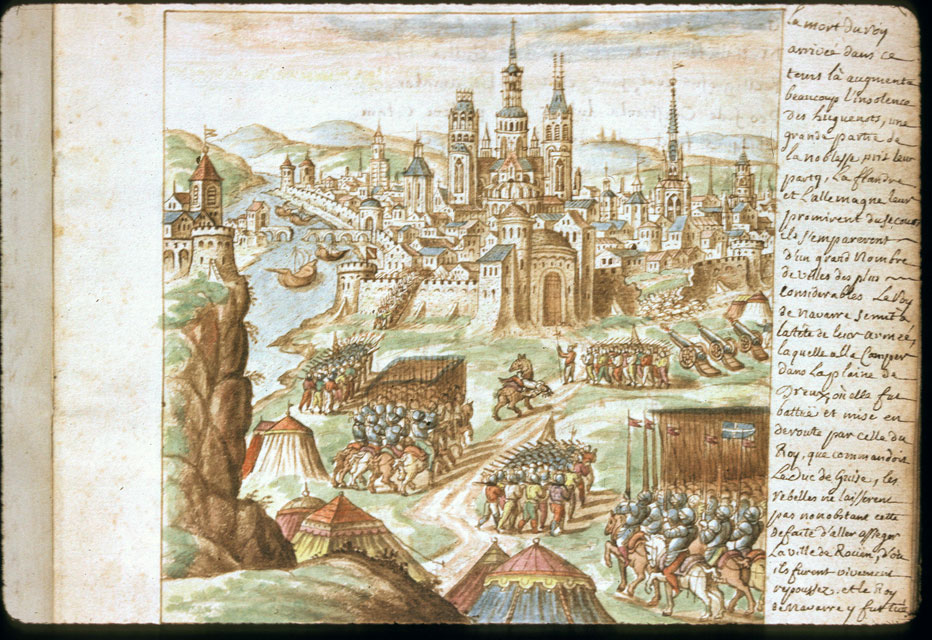
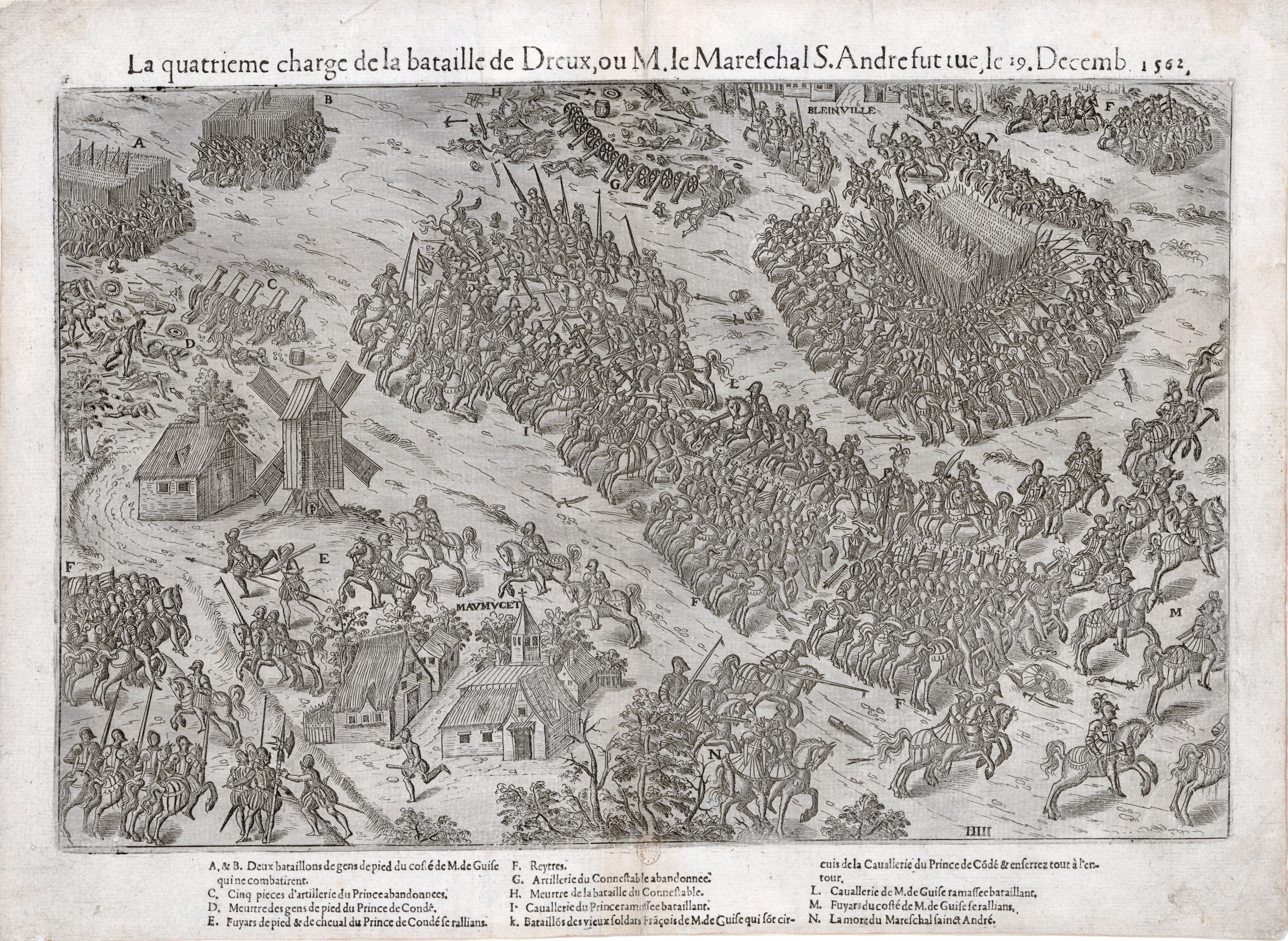
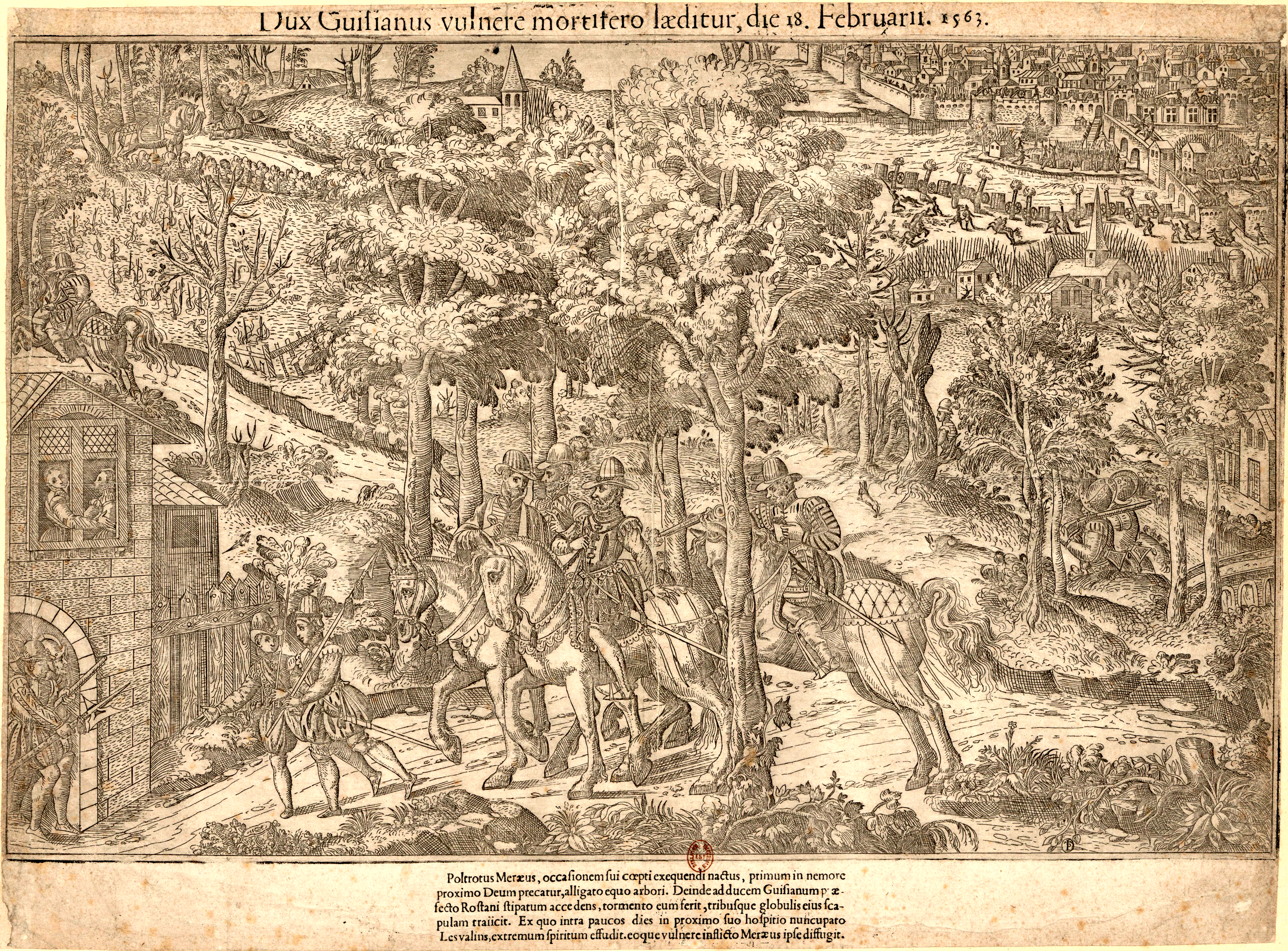
- Left to right: Massacre of Wassy by the Duc de Guise which shortly proceeded the outbreak of hostilities; The Siege of Rouen, one of the war's most bitterly fought confrontations; Fourth charge of the Battle of Dreux, the only major set piece battle; Assassination of the duc de Guise during the siege of Orléans, his death signalled the beginning of peace negotiations
Date	2 April 1562 – 19 March 1563
Location	Kingdom of France
Result	Negotiated settlements: Peace of Amboise, Treaty of Troyes

Belligerents
Protestants: French Protestants; England	Royalists: France Spain Papal States Savoy	Unaligned Protestants	Unaligned Catholics

Commanders and leaders
Prince de Condé (POW); Admiral de Coligny; Seigneur d'Andelot; Comte de La Rochefoucauld; Comte de Montgommery; Prince de Porcien; Baron des Adrets (POW); Seigneur de Mauvans; Seigneur de Duras †; Comte de Crussol; Sieur de Beaudiné; Seigneur de Montbrun; Sieur de Soubise; Comte de Gramont	King of Navarre (DOW); Constable de Montmorency; Duc de Guise †; Seigneur de Saint-André †; Duc de Montpensier; Duc de Nemours; Duc d'Aumale; Duc de Nevers (DOW); Seigneur de Monluc; Seigneur de Tavannes; Vicomte de Joyeuse; Comte de Tende; Comte de Cipiérre; Marquis de Villars; Baron de Terride; Baron de Biron	Duc de Bouillon; Mayor of La Rochelle	Comte de Carcès; Seigneur de Sommerive

Strength
Main Protestant army at peak strength: 16,000; Supplementary forces: England: 6,000; Imperial mercenaries: 7,300 (4,000 Landsknechts, 3,300 Reiters); Old Swiss Confederacy mercenaries: 6,000+	Main royal army at peak strength: 30,000; Supplementary forces: Spain: 3,000+ Savoy: 3,400 (3,000 infantry, 400 cavalry); Imperial mercenaries: 10,500; Old Swiss Confederacy mercenaries: 2,600; Italian mercenaries: 2,000	Unknown	Unknown

The First French War of Religion (2 April 1562 – 19 March 1563) was the opening civil war of the French Wars of Religion. The war began when, in response to the massacre of Wassy by the duc de Guise (duke of Guise), the prince de Condé seized Orléans on 2 April. Over the next several months negotiations would take place between the Protestant rebels (led by Condé and admiral Coligny) and the royal (largely Catholic) party led by queen Catherine, the king of Navarre, duc de Guise, marshal Saint-André and Constable Montmorency. While the main royal and rebel armies were in discussions, open fighting erupted across the kingdom, with rebel Protestants seizing many of the kingdom's principal cities, and restless Catholics massacring Protestants. Negotiations finally ended at the start of July, with the Protestant army attempting a surprise attack on the royal army.

The royal army planned a campaign to clear the Protestant held cities on the Loire before besieging Orléans, the rebel capital. To this end Navarre led the royal army in the capture of Blois, Tours and Bourges during July and August. With momentum slipping away, Condé distributed the rebel army back into the provinces, leaving only a small force in Orléans. Meanwhile, negotiations were undertaken between the Protestant rebels and the English crown, with Elizabeth I providing support in return for the surrender of Calais. Conscious of these negotiations, the royal army pivoted northwards, hoping to stem any English incursions into the kingdom. Therefore, instead of sieging Orléans, it would be Rouen that was besieged next. After almost a month of effort, the city was captured and put to the sack. During the siege, the king of Navarre was fatally wounded.

While initially planning to follow up the capture of Rouen with a march on English held Le Havre, Guise was suddenly forced to reckon with the Protestant army once more, which emerged from its stay in Orléans and made a dash for the capital. However, the Protestant army became bogged down besieging the towns and suburbs of the capital, allowing Guise to secure the city. Forced to break off from Paris, Condé and Coligny turned north and made for Normandy, hoping to secure pay from the English for their army and unify with English reinforcements. The royal army followed them and brought the rebels to battle at Dreux. The battle was a victory for the royalists, though a strongly pyrrhic one, with Constable Montmorency captured, Saint-André murdered and much of the royal gendarmerie destroyed. For the rebels, Condé was captured. Coligny withdrew from the field to Orléans with the remainder of the Protestant army. Guise now enjoyed complete ascendancy over the royal administration and determined to achieve a final victory with the capture of Orléans. Coligny slipped out of the city with the Protestant cavalry into Normandy, where he began to recapture much of the province. Guise meanwhile worked to reduce Orléans. Shortly before his siege could be finished, he was assassinated and Catherine seized the opportunity to bring the war to a negotiated settlement, achieved in the Edict of Amboise on 19 March 1563.

== Prelude ==
=== Background ===
With the death of Henri II in 1559, France was thrown into crisis. His young son François II ascended to the throne, though control of the government was put in the hands of his wife's uncles the duc de Guise and cardinal de Lorraine. The Lorraine brothers monopolised royal favour at the expense of the late king's other chief favourites, Constable de Montmorency, governor of Languedoc and commander of the French army, and Marshal Saint-André. With the young age of the new king, some felt that a regency should be in effect, and to this end looked to the princes du sang (princes of the blood – king's nearest agnatic relatives outside the family) for leadership. The senior princes du sang were the Bourbon-Vendôme, chief among them the king of Navarre and prince de Condé. While Navarre demurred from leading the opposition, Condé took up the cause. The Lorraine government continued and furthered the policy of persecution that had been undertaken under François II and thus political and Protestant opposition amalgamated. This exploded in March 1560 with the failed conspiracy of Amboise which attempted to remove the Lorraine princes from government and take control of the king. Condé's involvement in the conspiracy was suspected by the government. During the summer, he and his brother Navarre schemed, and the reverberations of Amboise continued to shake across France. After being implicated in a further conspiracy in September that attempted to seize Lyon, Navarre and Condé were summoned to court. Once there, Condé was arrested, and possibly sentenced to death. At this time, Constable Montmorency's nephew Admiral de Coligny established himself as a leader of the Protestant cause during an assembly of notables representing their petitions, much to the annoyance of Guise and Lorraine. In December an estates general was to meet. However, before it could begin, François II died. Henri II's widow Catherine de' Medici now stepped into the political centre, and asserted her right to the formal regency for her second son Charles IX. To do this she negotiated with Navarre who agreed to surrender his rights to the position in return for the release from captivity of Condé. As compensation he was established as lieutenant-general of France in early 1561, giving him supremacy over the French military, and superseding Montmorency. Catherine's government undertook conciliatory moves towards Protestantism. Aggrieved at this, and being ejected from their positions of authority, Guise, Saint-André and Montmorency undertook a reconciliation (known to history as the "Triumvirate") in April 1561, agreeing to work together during the current crisis to protect Catholicism. Further edicts were established through 1561 that they felt favoured Protestantism. During 1561, Protestantism experienced a massive growth across France and its spread was accompanied by large scale disorders, particularly in the south of the kingdom. By January 1562, Catherine had resolved that the only way to quiet the disorders was to undertake a limited legalisation of Protestantism on at least a temporary basis. This caused a break between her and the lieutenant-general Navarre, who was being courted by the Catholic "Triumvirate". Navarre rejected the edict and moved into opposition. He summoned Guise (who was at Saverne) to hurry back into the kingdom to join him in opposing toleration of Protestantism.

=== Wassy ===
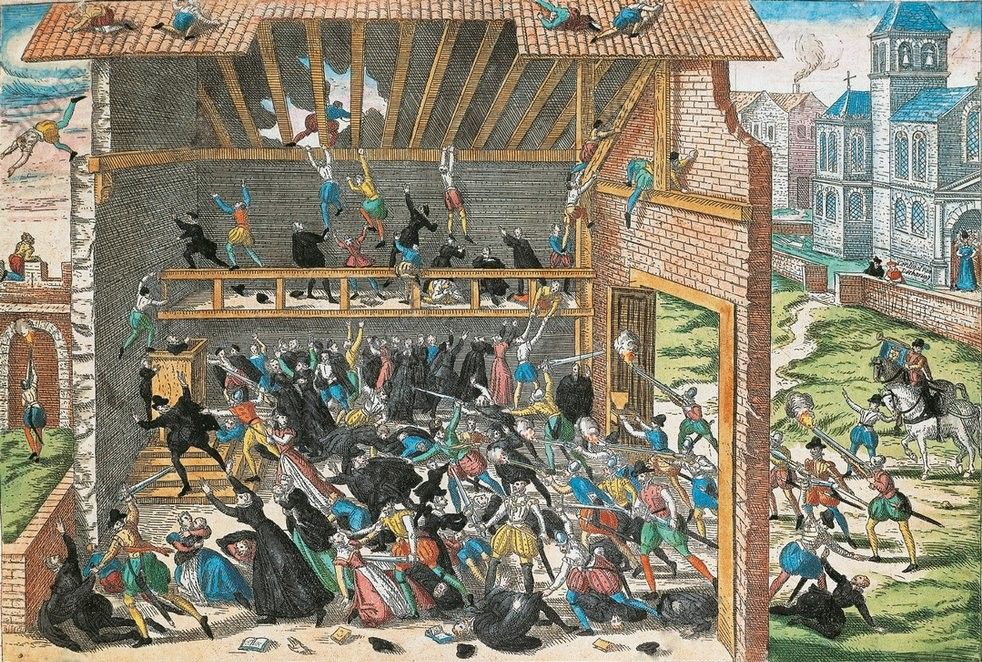
Troops of the duc de Guise slaughter the congregation of the Protestant church of Wassy

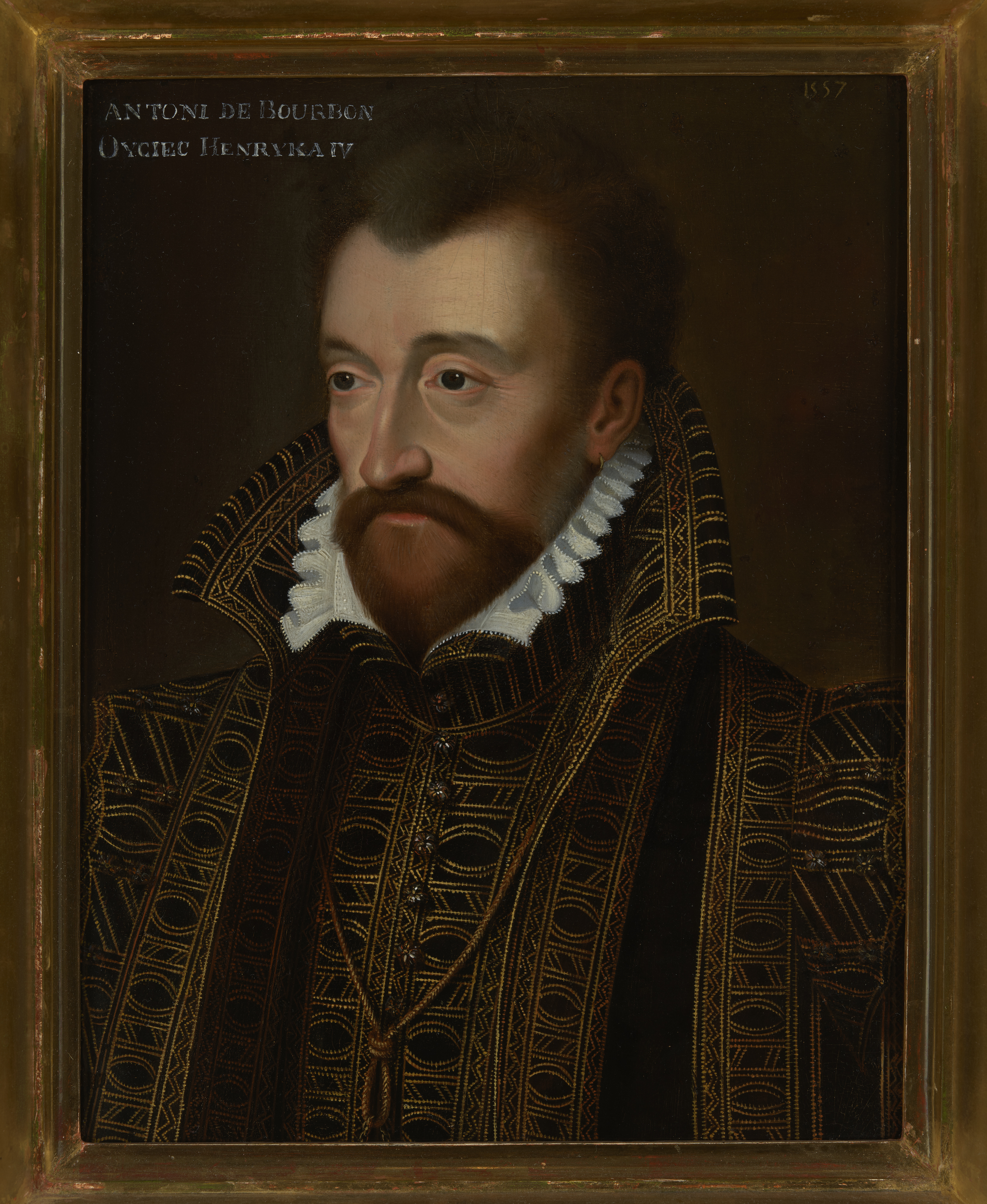
King of Navarre and lieutenant-general of the kingdom, who fought for the royalists during the First French War of Religion

On 1 March, the duc de Guise was in Wassy, on the road back to Paris from Saverne with a force of soldiers. He intended to make his way to Éclaron, before going on to the capital. It is possible he had only come to the town at the recommendation of the bishop Jérôme de Bourges, who had in the previous December confronted the Protestant congregation of the town and received insults. Théodore de Bèze alleges that Bourges complained to Guise, which spurred the duc to investigate the town. Wassy was home to one of the largest Protestant communities in Champagne. While in the town, he discovered a Protestant service being conducted, with around 600 worshippers present in a barn. He dispatched a few of his number to the barn, who attempted to gain entry but were refused. An exchange of insults between the worshippers and his soldiers quickly escalated. Stones were thrown by those inside the barn and pistols were fired by those outside. His soldiers, enraged, massacred between twenty five and fifty Protestant worshippers who tried to flee the barn, with around another 150 left injured by the incident. Houses were sacked, with Guise claiming to have found a cache of weapons in one of them. The Protestant preacher of Wassy was arrested and then deported to Saint-Dizier. Guise had seigneurial prerogatives over the town as it was part of his niece Marie Stuart's dowry, and in his reckoning the presence of Protestantism challenged his authority and the maintenance of order in his government.

In Protestant retellings of the events, Guise was accused of having instigated the massacre intentionally. Guise would maintain until his death that he had not incited the massacre. In Guise's telling, it was the Protestant congregation that had started the violence, wounding him in the cheek. The exact sequence of events is hard to reconstruct given the partisan nature of the accounts. Durot argues Guise's intention was to have the preacher arrested, so that the congregation, freed of the pernicious influence, could be brought back into the Catholic fold. Guise wrote to the duke of Württemberg, apologising for the killings and telling him he did not want this incident to sour relations between his family and the Lutherans. He also wrote to his lieutenant-general in Dauphiné, urging him to see to the arrest of Protestant pastors, but to make sure he arrested them when they were separated from their congregations, so as to avoid bloodbaths. Nevertheless, the fault for the massacre, in Guise's mind, lay not with himself but rather with the Protestants whose "law breaking bravado" and "religious error" caused the deaths. By the former Guise meant that the service was in contravention of the edict of January. He also felt there was an element of "divine justice" in the affair. While there had been more severe massacres in the past, such as that at Cahors in 1561, the involvement of Guise in this massacre, pre-meditated or otherwise, elevated its importance significantly. For contemporary Protestants, it was the first act of the war.

Once united with the royal party, the establishment of Guise's innocence and the fault of the Protestants for the massacre became a political priority. On 22 April it was declared by letters patent that Guise had been attacked by the Protestants. The constable de Montmorency supported Guise before the parlement (sovereign French court) in their hearing, which concluded in May that Guise had acted justly and in accordance with his rights. Three weeks after the massacre, Guise held an interview with the English ambassador in which he explained the massacre entirely without reference to religion, describing the incident as a case of impudent vassals who had challenged his seigneurial authority. According to Guise, the seditious rabble's behaviour contrasted with his aristocratic stoicism.

The massacre of Wassy was the final rupture of any possibility of coexistence between the Catholics and Protestants. In the cities of Sens, Cahors, Tours, Auxerre, Carcassonne and Avignon Catholics responded to news of the massacre by emulating it against their own Protestant communities. Guise was praised as a new "Jehu" whose actions had avenged the lord. In most cases, the massacres were instigated by men in authority, be they preachers, the town governor or a captain. In Angers, the Bourbon duc de Montpensier presided over executions of Protestants. Protestants, for their part, killed priests and monks, but generally focused their violence against the physical manifestations of Catholicism: relics, statues, churches, art. Wood argues that long before March many local conflicts in the kingdom had already developed the character of armed confrontations. Nicoll states that historians now look to provincial tensions as opposed to courtly aristocratic strife as the origin point of the wars.

At this time the prince de Condé was back in Paris, experiencing an illness. He had travelled to court in February but was met with some hostility; he therefore returned to Paris in March to oversee the publishing of the Edict of Saint-Germain. He gathered with Protestant nobles in the capital to debate how to proceed. Some favoured a military confrontation with the duc de Guise, but the moderates in the council prevailed and it was agreed to make an appeal to the crown. Nevertheless, a warning was sent out to the Protestant churches of France on 10 March to undertake preparations for their defence. It was stated that they were taking up arms in case the court was unable or unwilling to provide justice for Guise's crime, so that they would not be subject to similar attacks. Admiral de Coligny advised the churches of the kingdom to be ready to raise footmen and cavalry in case open war broke out in the kingdom.

The duc d'Aumale arrived back at court on 6 March. The purpose of his presence is speculated as being "information gathering" by Carroll. Carroll further notes that at this time, Guise was planning either to bring Catherine de' Medici into line with his program or seize power himself.

On 8 March, word of the butchery at Wassy arrived at the French court, which had just arrived at Montceaux. De Bèze and other Protestant nobles protested the massacre to Catherine, demanding of her that Guise be brought to justice. Catherine consented to their requests and summoned Guise to court to explain himself. Navarre then interrupted and chastised the Protestants for going to sermons under arms, the Ippolito II d'Este, cardinal di Ferrara, supporting his tirade by highlighting the "sedition" of Saint-Médard, Paris. De Bèze again entreated the crown to bring Guise to justice, which aroused the king of Navarre's fury, the prince angrily warning against anyone laying a hand on his "brother" the duc de Guise. He made it clear that he would stand side by side with Guise. He added that the Protestants of Wassy only got what they deserved for throwing stones at the duc. De Bèze argued that if Guise was indeed innocent of wrongdoing, he would have no difficulty in justifying himself, and justice would not harm him. Guise himself was uninterested in the summons, and continued on to Paris, joining up with his "Triumvir" allies, Jacques d'Albon and Montmorency en route.

=== On to Paris ===
Having departed Wassy, Guise made first for Éclaron where he spent a few days preparing for a return to court. Continuing onto Paris, news of the massacre travelled out in front of Guise, forcing him to make evasive manoeuvres to avoid being confronted by furious armed Protestants. In particular he had to avoid Vitry, where 500+ Protestants had taken refuge and assumed arms. He also could not enter Châlons, as the minority Protestant population forbade his entry. Guise rendezvoused with his "Triumvirate" colleagues at his estates of Nanteuil near Paris on 12 March. Alongside Jacques d'Albon and Montmorency, he joined with Aumale, the comte de Villars, and 600 other gentlemen. They tarried in Nanteuil for two days, planning how to proceed.

In Paris itself, the situation was tense, when word of Wassy arrived, Marshal de Montmorency spoke with the Protestants of the city, asking them to cease their worship for several days to avoid violence. The Protestants refused to concede to their adversaries. On 15 March, the day before Guise's arrival, Catholics of the city disinterred a Protestant who had been buried with the new rites. Protestants reburied their compatriot, only to have them disinterred a second time. In this series of disputes over burial, several were killed and injured.

=== Condé and Guise in the capital ===
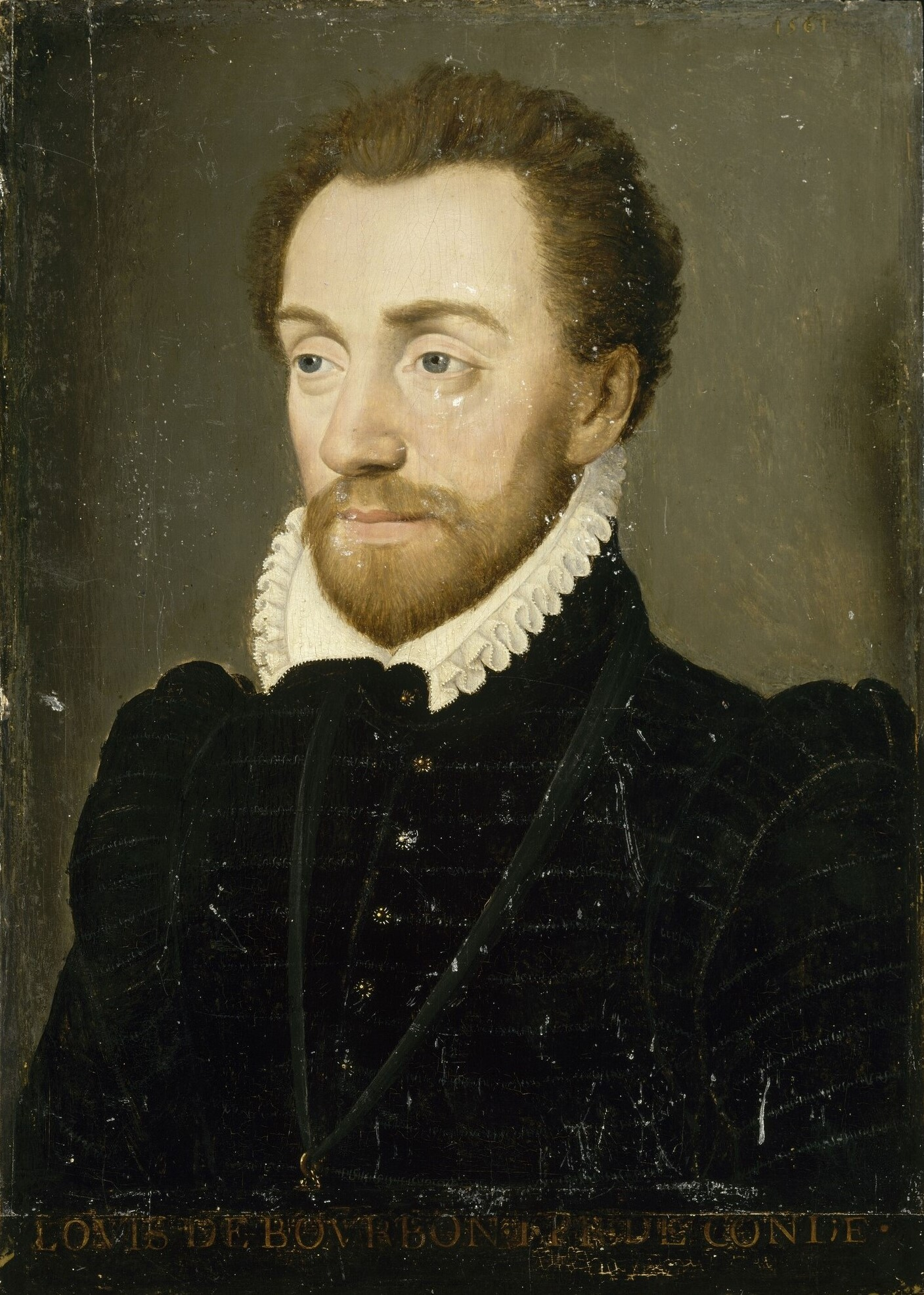
Leader of the Protestant rebellion against the crown the prince de Condé

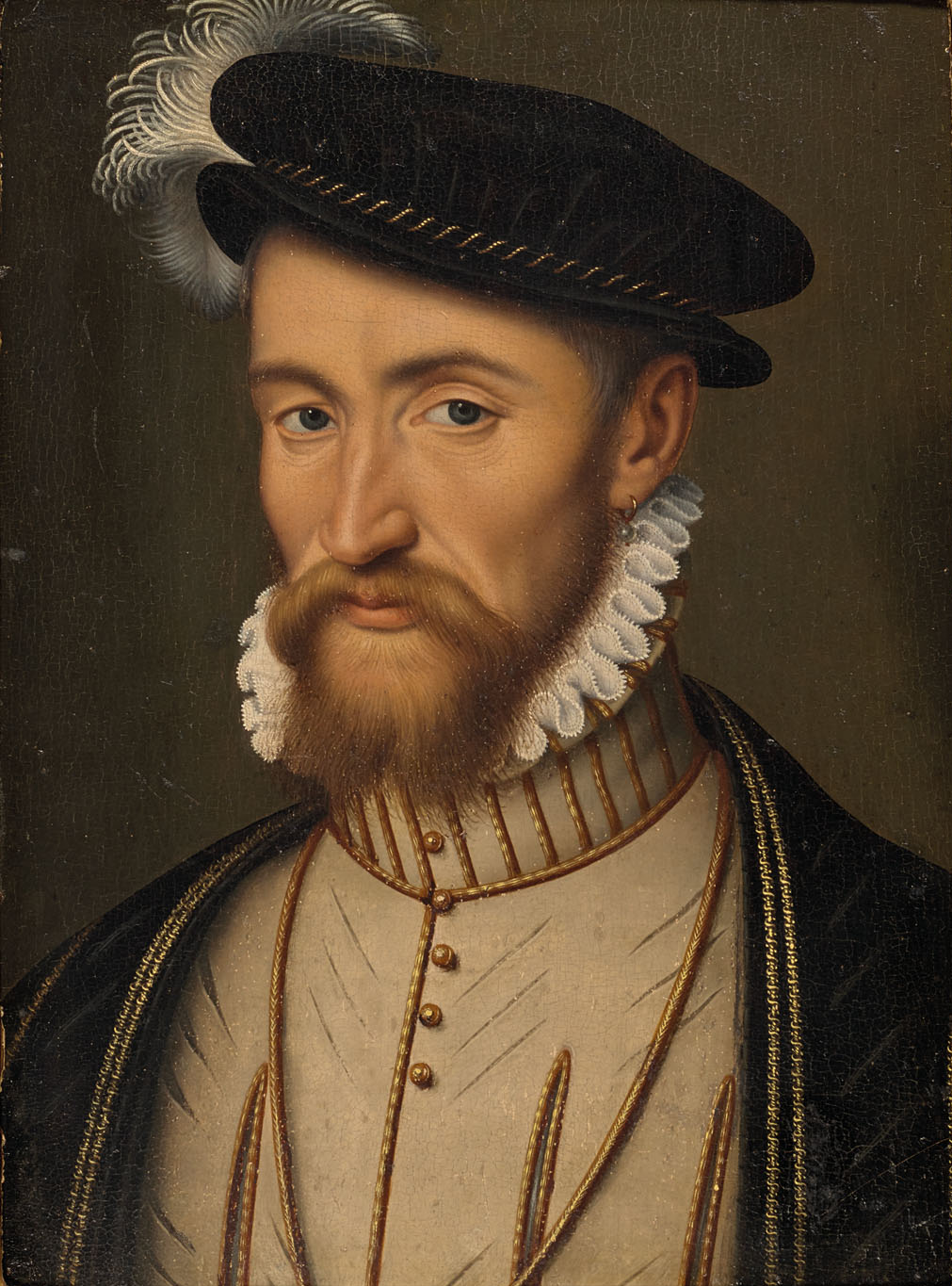
François, Duke of Guise, member of the "Triumvirate" and key military leader of the royalist cause during the civil war

On 16 March Guise and the "Triumvirate" arrived in Paris, the same day Condé entered the city. Guise was greeted in the manner of a triumph for his actions at Wassy, militant Catholics in the capital celebrating the victory of their "David" over "the Philistines". He was accompanied from the porte Saint-Denis to the hôtel de ville (city hall) by three thousand gentleman. This route was traditionally one taken through Paris by kings. The prévôt des marchands (provost of the merchants) of Paris offered to provide him an army of 20,000 men and a 2,000,000 écus (crowns) subsidy to bring about the pacification of the kingdom. Guise declined the offer, informing the prévôt that he was loyal to the regency government of Catherine and Navarre. Guise, Jacques d'Albon and Montmorency wrote to Catherine from the capital that it was necessary for them to remain in the capital to avoid the city descending into street battles.

As Guise's procession entered the capital, it passed by Condé, who was leading a procession of his followers (who numbered around 1,000) to a Protestant service. The leaders of the two processions exchanged salutes with the pommel of their swords as they passed by one another. On 20 March there was another riot in the capital as a Catholic crowd attempted to disinter a corpse that had been buried with Protestant rites. Bloodshed followed. Guise dispatched Marshal de Brissac to the court with instructions to bring Navarre to join with them as he was necessary for the preservation of order; Navarre therefore arrived in the capital on 21 March. After the arrival of Navarre, the lieutenant-general celebrated mass in Notre-Dame with the "Triumvirate". According to Pierre de Bourdeille, seigneur de Brantôme, the seigneur de Saint-André, proposed to Guise that they drown Catherine.

Entreated by De Bèze, Catherine moved to try and contain the potentially explosive situation in Paris. Indeed, some reported that Paris was more like a border town, with the sound of gunfire to be heard in it. By this time there were around 10,000 horsemen in the city. This was particularly true during Easter week, which began on 22 March. Pasquier described the processions as being accompanied by gunfire as if it were the percussion. She appointed the suitably neutral figure of the cardinal de Bourbon as governor of the city of Paris. As brother to both Navarre and Condé, he had the appropriate credentials to enjoy the confidence of both sides. Bourbon promptly ordered both Guise and Condé to vacate the capital. Condé, in part due to his fear of being attacked by a mob, would depart first on 23 March, while Guise, confident of Montmorency's support, tarried longer. During March, Catherine also appointed the seigneur de Méru (Lord of Méru), another of Montmorency's sons, as lieutenant-general of the Île de France.

=== Catherine between two camps ===
At this time, Catherine, who had moved with her son, the king, to Fontainebleau, wavered between the Protestant grandees and the Catholic. For a time (from 16 to 26 March) she considered engaging with Condé through his sister-in-law the queen of Navarre. In letters to Condé she protested that she "saw many things that displeased her and that her anger at the state of things was restrained by her confidence in him and his advice/support". An alliance with Condé would have involved locking herself up with the king and Condé in Orléans. At the same time she wrote letters of protest to Coligny on 25 March objecting to his "raising great companies of troops". Coligny replied from Meaux that his retinue composed his friends and neighbours and was hardly out of keeping with the behaviour of the duc de Guise. To pre-empt any moves in this direction, Guise and Montmorency secured the dismissal of the queen of Navarre from the court on 27 March. Catherine would later protest against Condé publishing her private letters she had sent during this time for "partisan ends". Catherine claimed that Condé misinterpreted the meaning of the letters.

Condé, for his part, ignored the pleas of the queen after his departure from Paris on 23 March. Benedict speculates that this may have derived either from cowardice or a desire for conflict.

=== Control of the monarchy ===
Guise, by contrast, did not miss the opportunity to control the crown, and oversaw the bringing back of the royal family to Paris. Both he and the lieutenant-general Navarre had travelled to Fontainebleau to fetch the royal family on 27 March, accompanied by a thousand horse. Guise informed Catherine that she and her son were not safe from Protestant attack at Fontainebleau, and it was necessary to come to Paris for their security. Catherine initially protested, but Guise informed her of Condé's forces in the area and she yielded to the request. To secure her more genuine support, the "Triumvirate" would establish Catherine in a leadership role.

=== Paris under the Triumvirate ===
On 1 April in Paris, the sailors who disembarked weapons at the porte (gate) Saint-Antoine made an attempt to assassinate the Protestant preacher Jean Malot. They identified the wrong man and killed a merchant and several nearby women. On 4 April, Montmorency helped inflame the sentiment of the Parisian Catholics by demonstrating the approval of grandees for their actions. He oversaw the destruction of two Protestant temples in the city on 5 April. Accompanied by soldiers and gentlemen, he tore down a preaching hall known as "Jerusalem" in the faubourg (suburb) Saint-Jacques, before proceeding to repeat the operation in Popincourt. Arms were seized and distributed to his soldiers. House to house searches were made to look for Protestant preachers. One was arrested while another escaped, a Protestant parlementaire was also arrested. The crowd of Parisians was keen to join in the destruction, and rushed forward to tear down what was left of the temple at Popincourt, dragging it to the place de Grève where they cast it into a large bonfire to cries of "god has not forgotten the people of Paris". Being cast into bonfires would also be the fate of much of the Protestant literature of Paris, with the works of Calvin and de Bèze torched in great pyres in the place Maubert.

In the wake of their participation in the destruction of the Protestant temples, the Catholics of Paris formed a new militia.

The royal family arrived in Paris on 6 April. Their journey to the city was accompanied by a thousand men-at-arms. They were met by the prévôt des marchands and much of the bourgeois of Paris and then proceeded to the Louvre. While the Edict of Saint-Germain was not voided, an exemption would be established for the vicomté (viscounty) of Paris within a week of the royal families arrival in the capital by the parlement. Nevertheless, on 9 April, while looting of houses was ongoing, the court did declare that no one was to attack or harm another on account of their religion. On 12 April, the court took mass at the grand church of Notre-Dame de Paris. Around this time, chancellor L'Hôpital violently quarrelled with the duc de Montmorency and frustrated departed court to his estates.

Condé, having left Paris, went first to his estates at La Ferté-sous-Jourre. There he found his wife and made outreach to the Châtillon brothers to join him at Meaux. Coligny for a while was wracked by indecision, unsure whether to join with Condé despite the urgings of his neighbours the seigneur de Genlis and seigneur de Briquemault. Eventually, however, he resolved on joining with Condé, according to Aubigné, at the urgings of his wife. Condé put himself at the head of a force of around 1,800 men. He travelled to Meaux where he rendezvoused with the queen of Navarre (who was returning south to her domains) admiral Coligny and the colonel-general of the French infantry François de Coligny d'Andelot.

== Condé's rebellion ==
=== Seizure of Orléans ===
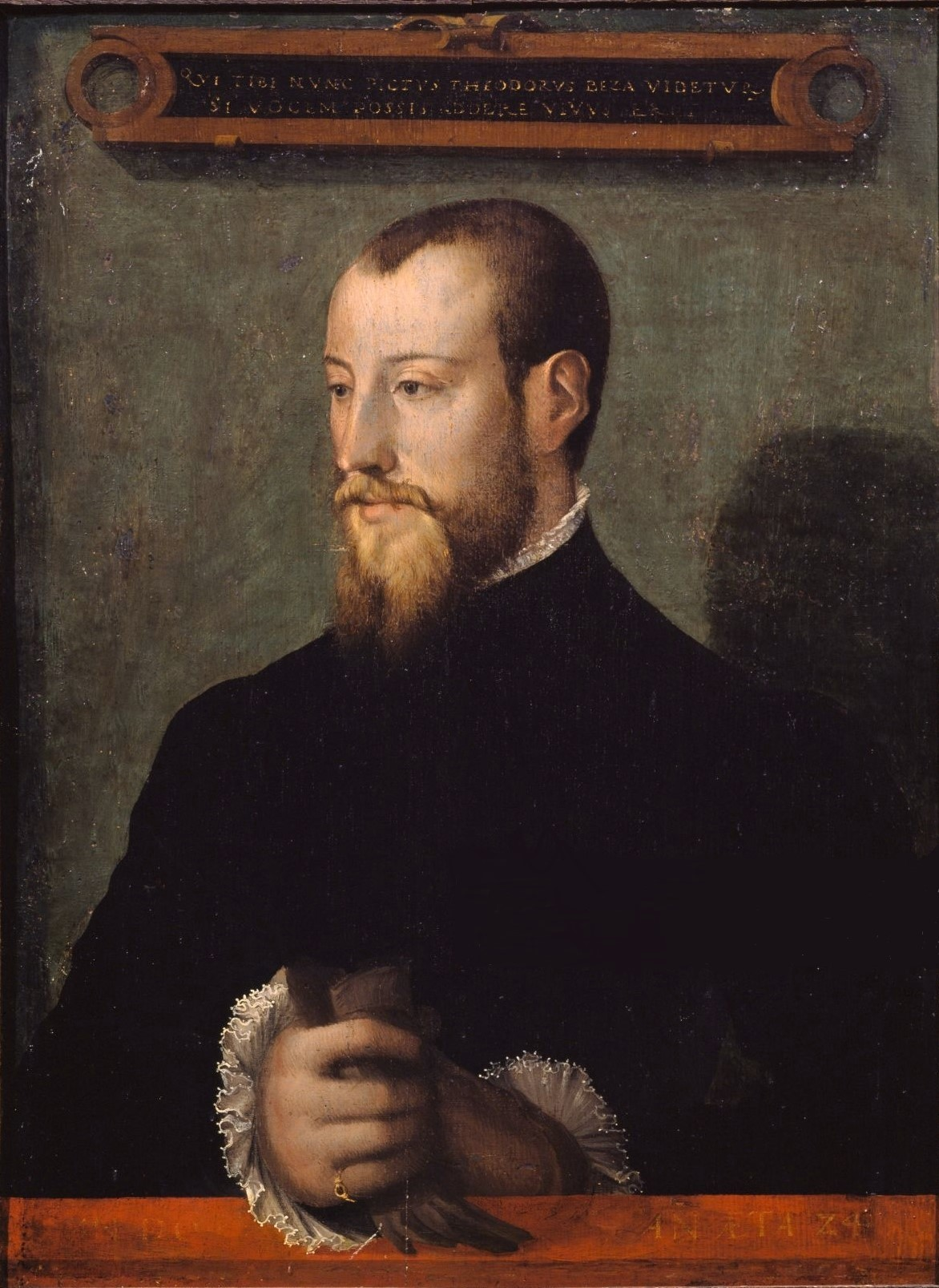
Théodore de Bèze right-hand man to Jean Calvin and leading Protestant pastor of Louis I, Prince of Condé's rebellion

Condé, at the head of his army, first moved towards Paris around 27/28 March. He set himself up at Saint-Cloud with his forces for a while; however, Cardinal de Bourbon had seen to the raising of the bridges. Coligny meanwhile had established himself at Montreuil. There was great alarm in Paris as this force of around 3,000 horsemen approached, with preparations quickly undertaken to put the city on a siege footing. The prince did not immediately resort to combat, and protested that he had as much right to enter the city under arms as did the duc de Guise. Failing to quickly enforce a settlement upon the crown, and with the royal family now securely in the hands of the "Triumvirate", Condé ignored a demand from the crown to disarm and marched towards Orléans. There was some urgency in this as the grand maître de l'artillerie (grand master of the artillery) Antoine d'Estrées had been dispatched by the royalists to ensure Orléans' preservation. Though the gates were locked to Condé, his confederates inside the city marched on the gates in arms and opened them to him; Condé thereby assumed control of Orléans. As his troops marched through the city, Protestants cried out "long live the gospel". With this act the civil war had begun. Harding argues that for many regions of France, this was not the beginning of the civil war, but just an escalation in an already ongoing conflict. Orléans would prove invaluable as a centre from which to police the Loire for the rebels.

It happened that the national synod of the Protestant church was meeting in Orléans on 25 April. It declared that the royal family was in fact a hostage of the "Triumvirate", and that Condé was the protector of the crown. Condé was established by this synod as the protector of the Protestant church in France. Despite the feverish political atmosphere that surrounded the synod, the body itself was largely cautious and conservative in its pronouncements, cautioning churches against making their own ordonnances, a prerogative that belonged to the magistrate.

Condé issued a manifesto for his rebellion on 8 April. He justified his decision to assume arms and called for military aid. He outlined that as a prince du sang it was his duty to protect the consultative decision-making processes of the kingdom, and that this same status gave him a natural right to defend the king's subjects against those who might try to oppress them with violence. Largely political in character, it is possible Condé was hoping moderate Catholics, likewise outraged by Wassy, would rally to his banner. Condé accused the "Triumvirate" of holding his brother Navarre in captivity. The manifesto echoed that produced for the conspiracy of Amboise, though now with the open backing of a prince du sang providing it significantly more weight. He was joined in Orléans by the Protestant preacher de Bèze who wrote to the queen of Navarre expressing his disapproval at the rash of Protestant iconoclasm and tomb breaking that some radical Protestants were engaged in during these months (among them Protestants in Vendôme where Navarre was staying who ransacked the graves of the Bourbon-Vendôme ducs.) The queen of Navarre's complicity in the sacking of the churches is a matter of dispute.

On 20 March, de Bèze had written to all the churches of France, urging them to prepare their defences for the conflict to come. The full mobilisation of the church would be requested by de Bèze and Jacques Spifame, the former bishop of Nevers, on 5 and 7 April. Jacques du Broullat, bishop of Arles, who was by 1562 a Protestant, joined Condé's army as a chaplain. In 1563 he provided one of his abbeys to his co-religionists as a fortress; it was quickly seized by the Catholic army.

Alongside this clerical support, Condé had with him in Orléans many Protestant nobles, who signed a separate "treaty of association" on 11 April. In Durot's estimation, this was based on the "Lords of the Congregation" in Scotland. In total there would be 73 noble signatories. The treaty declared that their purpose was to restore the liberty of the king and his mother's government. The writings not only defended the Edict of Saint-Germain on religious grounds, but also on political, the edict had been established on the advice of the princes du sang, judges of the parlements and the notables of the court. It therefore had legal power during the minority of a king. It declared that its signatories would not despoil churches or break idols. Among those who signed were the sieur de Beaudiné; the seigneur de La Meilleraye, governor of Pont L'Évêque; the lieutenant general of Picardy the sieur de Sénarpont; the governor of Boulogne, seigneur de Morvilliers; François de La Noue; the comte de La Rochefoucauld (who had recently arrived in Orléans with a large company of Poitevan gentleman); the sieur de Soubise; the seigneur de Piennes; the vicomte de Rohan and the prince de Porcien. According to Carroll, Porcien's motivations for joining the rebellion was a matter of conscience.

A great number of the nobles came from Condé's governate of Picardy, while many others came from Valois and Brie (where many of his seigneuries lay), Normandy, the Île de France and the south. At this initial stage in mid-April, the Protestant force assembled at Orléans numbered around 3,000 men. The arriving volunteers were divided into companies and made subject to exacting military discipline. The manifesto was distributed to foreign governments who were likely to be sympathetic, so that they might proffer him armed support. In sum, it was sent to England, the German princes, Emmanuel Philibert, Duke of Savoy, the Imperial diet and the Cantons of the Swiss Confederation. Calvin offered his open support to Condé's rebellion, something he had not done with the conspiracy of Amboise in 1560. Along with the manifesto were sent copies of the letters that Catherine had sent to Condé during March, in which she asked for his support. It was also distributed across France for the purpose of raising an army. Coligny set to work raising money from Geneva and took out a loan in Basel to fund the establishment of an army. A military force now totalling around 8,000 men (6,000 foot and 2,000 horse) was present at Orléans. In Coligny's design, this was to be a "holy army" that did not engage in vices and was solely motivated by its desire to see the preservation of the "true religion" and the protection of the royal family. François de La Noue, the Protestant captain and writer, seemed impressed by the discipline and behaviour of the army.

The mustering of such large numbers of soldiers incubated the plague, which would subsequently cross northern France along with the armies during the coming months. The core of Condé's army was composed of four compagnies d'ordonnance (the kingdom had around sixty) with the rest of his force composed of volunteers. Condé relied on networks of reciprocity and patronage among the nobility, with each noble who came to his cause bringing their network with them. Some who tried to join with Condé in Orléans were intercepted on the road and imprisoned. Among such figures would be the future famous poet Agrippa d'Aubigné. In total, around 10-15% of the French nobility would join one side of the conflict or the other.

After the capture of Orléans, Sancerre and La Charité fell to Condé. The surroundings of Orléans would be swept up into rebel control in July. Sometime between April and June, the comte de Crussol would depart court and join with Condé in Orléans before travelling on to his estates in the Vivarais and retiring from the war for the moment.

=== War of words ===
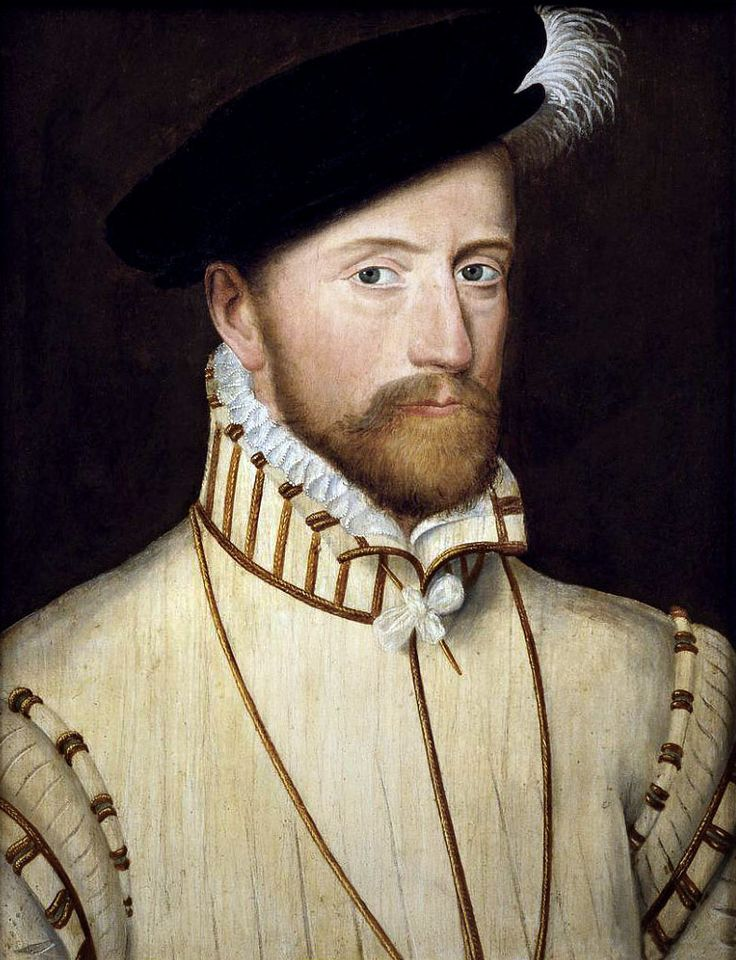
Seigneur de Saint-André, member of the "Triumvirate" and one of the key royalist military leaders of the first French War of Religion

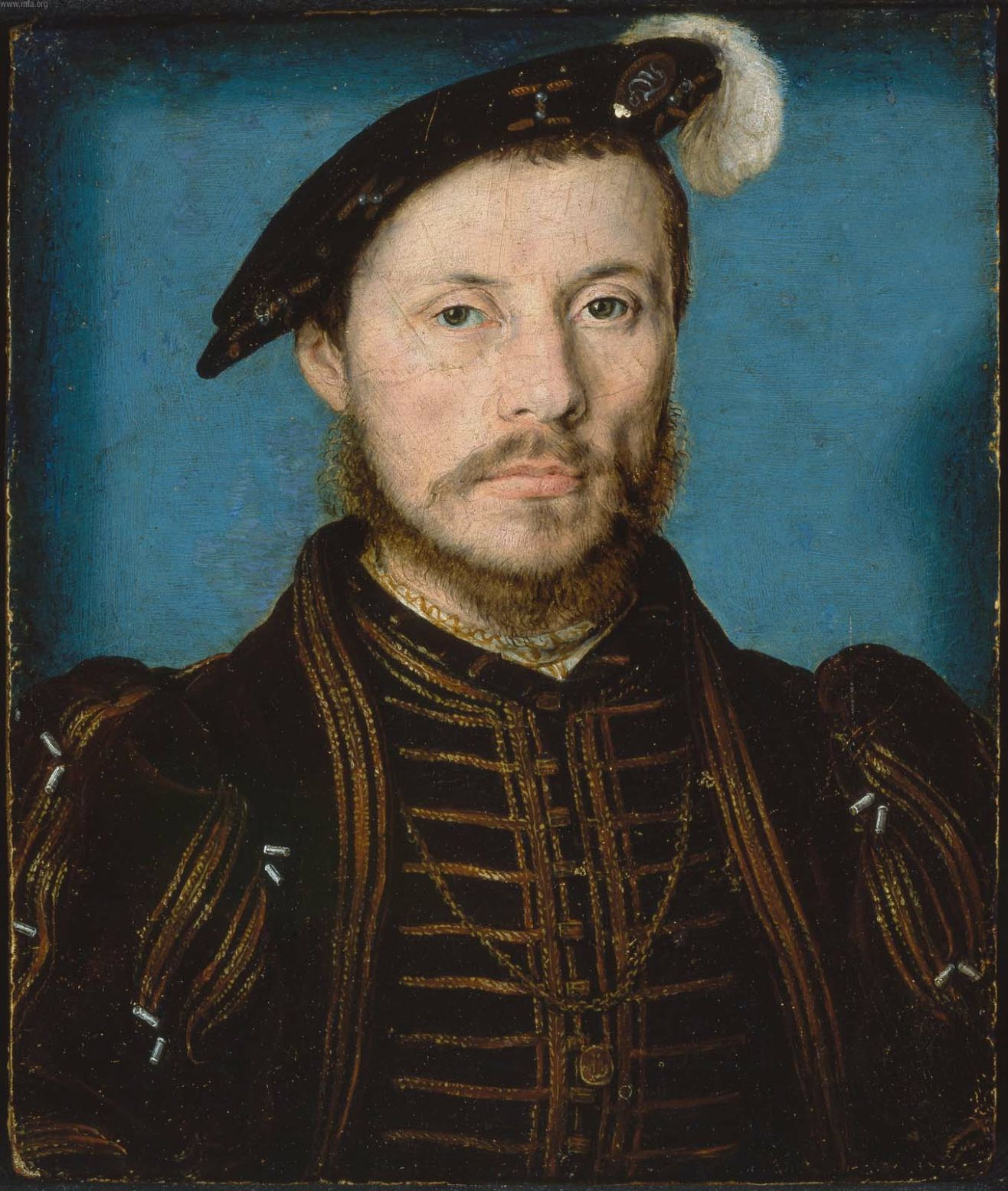
Constable de Montmorency, member of the "Triumvirate" and head of the royal war effort after the death of Antoine of Navarre, the king of Navarre

On 4 May the "Triumvirate" made their first written declaration. In this declaration Saint-André, Montmorency and Guise affirm that to protect god and the kingdom, it was not possible to tolerate religious pluralism in the kingdom. Those who had taken up arms must cast them down immediately, as only the lieutenant-general Navarre has the right to raise an army.

The war of words did not end with the initial declarations, and Condé issued a further response to the royal court on 19 May. In this document he argued that those who wished to change the Edict of Saint-Germain and impose a new one that demanded religious uniformity were but three "private persons" who, much like the original Triumvirs of Marc Antony, Lepidus and Augustus, wished to undermine the laws of the republic. By their arbitrary proposals, they wanted to make law against the law of the kingdom. Condé informed the reader that he, by contrast, had no private motive. During these years, many pieces of art were created depicting the massacres perpetrated by the original Triumvirate.

For the royalist side, the famous poet Pierre Ronsard composed verse which blamed the chaos of France on the actions of the Protestants. This was met with sharp invectives in response from the pastor La Roche-Chandieu and Bernard de Montméja, both of whom wrote back under pseudonyms.

Not all writers were as bellicosely committed to a side as Pierre de Ronsard. Jean de La Taille bemoaned a situation where father would be turned against son and wife against husband.

=== Moves of the royal family ===
Young king Charles IX, governed for in a regency

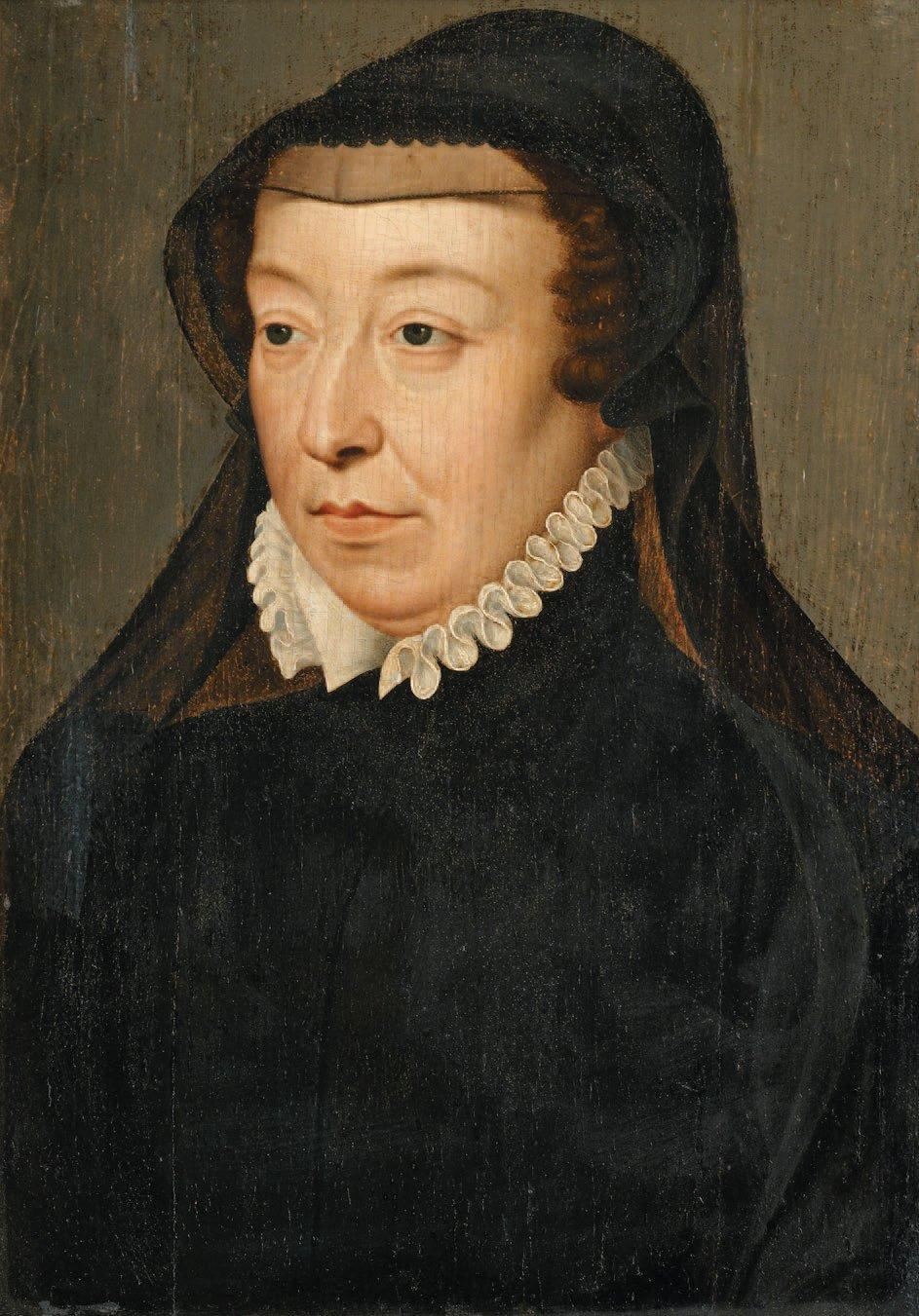
Catherine de' Medici, de facto regent of the kingdom who endeavoured to maintain the independence of the crown during the civil war

On 22 April the royal family, Montmorency, Navarre and Guise visited the Royal Arsenal. Having dined, they inspected the artillery pieces and fired some test rounds.

To signal to their detractors that they were not prisoners of the "Triumvirate", the royal family then departed to the Château de Montceaux on 14 May, before Catherine decided to send her children to the Château de Vincennes for their security. Catherine's denial that she and her son were captives of the "Triumvirate" fatally undermined Condé's declarations and recast him as a rebel. What had transpired in Wassy could now be characterised as a riot; meanwhile, Condé's seizure of a great city of the kingdom was a clear act of rebellion.

The Château de Vincennes, constructed under the direction of Charles V, boasted a level of security which could deter any attempted surprise attack by Protestant forces. The royal children were accompanied by two hundred gentlemen and a further three hundred soldiers under the authority of Piero Strozzi.

=== Negotiations ===
Shortly after their arrival in Orléans, Coligny and d'Andelot made an offer to the crown for a meeting with Catherine. The conditions of this meeting would be that Montmorency's son the seigneur de Damville, Navarre's son the Henri IV, prince de Béarn and a member of the Lorraine family would be kept in Orléans as hostages. While Catherine was open to the proposal, Navarre, Guise and Montmorency all protested strongly.

On the same day as he made his declaration, a diplomatic mission was despatched by the crown to treat with Condé. It consisted of two of the four secrétaires d'État (secretaries of state), Alluye and Fresne, alongside the surintendant des finances (superintendent of the finances) the seigneur de Gonnor. After a brief stay in Orléans, they departed on 10 April. A second diplomatic mission was sent out by the crown 3 days later, this one consisting of Alluye and Gonnor. Finally, on 24 April, a third effort was made, this one comprising the bishop of Limoges and Orléans. Before his departure on 2 May, the bishop of Orléans bore witness to the sack of his Cathedral in Orléans. As the Protestant party witnessed success throughout April with the acquisition of many cities across France, Navarre and Montmorency's opposition to a negotiated settlement faltered. They were held back from reshaping the royal policy by Guise and marshals seigneur de Saint-André and the comte de Brissac who remained uninterested in compromise. At the Protestant end, the diplomatic efforts were stymied by Coligny, who feigned illness during the visit of the ambassadors. Arriving back at the Louvre, the diplomats walked the gardens with Catherine, Montmorency and Navarre. They reported that Condé demanded, in exchange for backing down and disarming, that the "Triumvirate", Montmorency, Guise and Saint-André all disarm and withdraw from court. Condé further wished to see the Edict of Saint-Germain fully implemented. The secrétaires were troubled by their mission, seeing clearly that there was little sign that a compromise could be reached. They greatly feared the escalation of the civil war that was surely to follow the failure of their missions. The bishop of Limoges bemoaned the mercenaries being raised by each side, which would surely result in depredations of the kingdom. The demand that the "Triumvirate" depart from court was met coldly by Catherine, who rejoined that it was not appropriate for a king to be denied the presence of the great men of his kingdom during his minority.

A meeting was undertaken between the two sides at Thoury. Each side was composed of one hundred gentlemen with thirty horses. Leading the Protestants were Condé, the three Châtillon brothers and La Rochefoucauld; for the royalists, Catherine, Navarre and Damville. Both parties stopped 800 paces apart while the talks were undertaken. A two-hour interview followed. Catherine informed Condé that it was not possible to enforce the edict of Saint-Germain as the greater parts of France were opposed to it. Though the meeting was a failure, both sides were allowed to approach each other so that they could exchange greetings and embraces. Upon departing, many of the gentlemen were tearful. Having returned to Orléans, Condé wrote to Navarre on 13 June expressing his regrets at the failures of Thoury, causing his brother to weep upon receipt of the letter.

Catherine and Navarre conducted three interviews with Condé at the end of June from 27 to 29 of that month. These took place at the abbey Saint-Simon near Talcy. However, they were unable to convince him to back down from his rebellion. She offered Condé exile from France until such time as Charles reached his majority; however, this was unacceptable for Coligny, who brought with him much of the rest of the army in his opposition. For a time during the conference, it seemed possible a deal for peace might be reached. Fresne even began drafting letters to be sent out into the provinces for the enforcement of its terms; however, this would not come to pass. When he returned to the Protestant camp to work out some details of Condé's exile, Fresne found that there had been a change of mind, and he warned Catherine to this effect. Realising that armed confrontation would be necessary as no compromise was possible, Catherine remarked, "since you rely on your forces, we will show you ours". Catherine was greatly frustrated by the failure, blaming malicious individuals around Condé who had poisoned his mind against the plan.

It was only on 16 June that Catherine used the term "civil war" for the first time in her correspondence, though even at this point it was something that could happen if negotiations failed. On 22 June she spoke for the first time of the civil war as a present reality. Sutherland therefore takes June as the beginning of the civil war.

Coligny entreated separately with his uncle Montmorency, in an effort to convince him that his alliance was disadvantageous to his person and the reputation of his house. Coligny argued that the nobility would come to despise his house as a result of his actions. Montmorency replied that he had acted as a second father to Coligny, and that he was saddened to see him in league with the rebels. The Constable assured Coligny he was working only towards the honour of the king and God.

=== Phoney war ===
During the negotiations, the royal forces that had assembled gathered on the Loire so that they might be prepared to begin campaigning should the negotiations fail. Having set out the army arrived at Montlhéry on 1 June. They undertook a showdown with the Protestant army, getting as close to Orléans as Pithiviers. The royal force then made a thrust towards Jargeau, to which Coligny and d'Andelot responded by destroying the bridge so that the town could not be used to cut off Orléans. The royal army therefore moved towards Beaugency, where it was shadowed by the Protestant army, the two sides arriving a few kilometres apart from one another south of the river on 15 June. Navarre proposed a truce of 6 days, so that he might meet with Condé beneath the walls of Beaugency so they could discuss peace. Though Navarre caused anger in the Protestant camp by the behaviour of his soldiers in Beaugency, the talks between the brothers were profitable, with a preliminary agreement for the Protestant rebels to submit to royal justice in return for the departure to their estates of the Triumvirs. After the expiration of the truce on 21 June, the two sides engaged in some half hearted skirmishes while perfunctory negotiations continued. The royal army then departed towards Blois.

== Provincial conflicts ==
Those of the largest cities in the kingdom seized by the Protestants

In response to Condé's manifesto, Protestants rose up and seized Lyon, Tours, Amboise, Saumur, Poitiers, Caen, Bayeux, Dieppe, Blois, Valence, Rouen, Angers, Le Havre, Grenoble, Auxerre, Beaugency, Montpellier, Mâcon and Le Mans among other places. In total the Protestants would seize around a third of the 60 largest cities in the kingdom. By the seizure of towns and cities, the Protestants not only ensured their safety but also added bargaining chips they could use for future negotiations with the crown. The majority of the seizures were undertaken by surprise and with collaboration between a group inside the town or city and Protestant nobles/soldiers outside the walls. Those in the city often seized a gate or section of the wall, then allowed the external troops in to overwhelm the garrison before it could mobilise.

Many of these town seizures were accompanied by the murder of priests and monks, and acts of ideological vandalism. This was directed against the religious paraphernalia of Catholicism as it had been in the prior years, but also against the tombs of royal predecessors, such as that of Louis XI. The great success of the Protestants in seizing cities was a reflection of the exploitation of the urban privileges which had not yet been eroded by the monarchy. By the seizure of cities, the Protestant rebels saw the acquisition of useful privileged and enclosed spaces. Control of cities would be the anchor around which the Protestant strategy revolved. Control of the countryside was a lower priority for both the Protestants and their Catholic opponents.

In the south, the Protestants took control of Nîmes, La Charité-sur-Loire, Sancerre, Nérac, Castres, Montauban and the towns of Béarn. These occupations would prove more long lasting than many of the ephemeral northern occupations. Indeed, some of the Protestant controlled communities in the Midi would remain under their authority for much of the period until 1598.

The lieutenant-general of the province of Dauphiné, La Motte-Gondrin was assassinated in Valence on the orders of the Protestant baron des Adrets. A brutal commander (characterised by one historian as a "bloodthirsty thug"), Adrets was able to reduce the region to obedience to the rebel cause. His campaign was one of terror for the Catholic population. For a while he even threatened the Papal territory of Avignon. In Languedoc, the Protestant commander Jacques de Crussol, 2nd Duke of Uzès was ascendant. In Guyenne and Gascogne, the seigneur de Duras, and comte de Gramont, both protégés of the queen of Navarre, campaigned for the Protestant cause. While in Provence, it would be the seigneur de Mauvans.

These men were variously opposed by the lieutenant-generals and subordinates of the provinces: the vicomte de Joyeuse in Languedoc, seigneur de Maugiron in Dauphiné, Saint-Forgeaux in Auvergne and finally the seigneur de Monluc in Guyenne (Monluc would be made lieutenant-general in December 1562). Maugiron was a client of Guise, and Guise could also count on the governors of Grenoble, Gap and Tour-du-Pin to support him. Of similar religious proclivities to Joyeuse in Languedoc was the key governor of Narbonne, the baron de Fourquevaux. In Guyenne, Monluc was supported by the comte d'Escars, comte de Noailles, governor of Bayonne and seigneur de Burie, lieutenant-general of Guyenne. For a while this group of loyalists was unable to resist the wave of Protestant successes.

== Royal campaign ==
=== Royal army ===
With no peace possible, Catherine prepared herself for war. She conducted a review of German mercenaries that had been recruited by the crown at Charenton with her two eldest sons. The German mercenaries were commanded by princes of the empire: the Johann Wilhelm, Duke of Saxe-Weimar, the Philibert, Margrave of Baden-Baden and Peter Ernst I von Mansfeld-Vorderort. The arrière ban was declared, which compelled all noble vassals of the king to offer their service for several months; this was despite the fact that many nobles preferred to serve as volunteers.

Temporary companies were also raised alongside the compagnies d'ordonnance; these were popular with noble volunteers who did not wish for the "indignity" of serving with the royal infantry.

==== Foreign friends ====
Outreach was conducted for military support from Philip II of Spain, the Pope and the Duke of Savoy. Back in April, Catherine had secured a loan of 200,000 écus from the Pope. It was agreed that he would donate half the sum and loan the other half. He also opened inquisition proceedings against the cardinal de Châtillon. With an army of 14,000 infantry raised domestically, she secured promises on 10 May of a further 10,000 infantry and 3,000 cavalry from Philip II; and 3,000 infantry and 400 cavalry from the duke of Savoy. Not all the French infantry that the crown had was brought to bear in the royal army, as the removal of the infantry from the fortresses of Metz and Calais could not be countenanced, even during this time of civil war. Philip would pay for his soldiers during their French service, while Catherine paid for the services of a further 10,550 Germans, 2,600 Swiss and 2,000 Italian soldiers. This was despite the financial difficulties Philip was experiencing at the time. In the end, Philip II would only provide around 3,000 of the soldiers he promised. The secrétaire d'État de Fresne wrote to the governor of Bayonne, the vicomte d'Orthe in May to let him know to expect 3,000 Spanish soldiers to arrive around Bayonne. On 8 April an agreement had been reached with the Count von Roggendorf for him to provide 1,200 reiters and he entered the country with his mercenary force in early July. The Swiss had built their reputation as infantrymen during the Italian Wars and therefore the French crown regularly renewed the contract it had with the region. The Swiss Catholic force was commanded by the colonel Ludwig Pfyffer. Their prowess was known, and the German mercenaries modelled their fighting on them.

The core of the royal army comprised seven companies that constituted the king's household force. This was supplemented in 1562 by a further eight companies which were called the "king's guard". This would constitute the nucleus of the main bulk of the army, the sixty-five compagnies d'ordonnance of men-at-arms (totalling around 6,500 men). These companies of heavy cavalry had been established in the final days of the Hundred Years War. The gendarmerie, though still largely noble, was less purely so than it had been in the reign of François I. Thus it was necessary for both commoners and mercenaries to be added to the ranks of this institution. Due to defections of many nobles to the rebel side, the royal army in June boasted only around 22 gendarme companies. Therefore, the crown authorised the creation of 22 new companies, and bolstered the strength of many of the existing companies. The crown's three regiments of infantry remained loyal and fought in the Bourges campaign. Over the course of the civil war, they would be supplemented by a further five regiments. Most of the captains that had been established by the colonel-general of the French infantry, d'Andelot, joined the rebel Protestants with him and fought at Rouen. D'Andelot was replaced in his charge by Randan for the royalist cause at the start of the war. The crown authorised its provincial governors to enact extraordinary impositions, be it forced loans or requisitions. This system of latitude to governors for financial decisions would remain in force for the vast majority of the next forty years.

=== Rebel army ===
By June, the Protestants had around 20,000 soldiers assembled at Orléans. The Protestants received a further 5,200 infantry from their supporters in the southern provinces. Many of the Protestant soldiers comprised the urban bourgeois. In the Protestant army there were three arquebusiers for every pikeman, while in the royal army there were two pikemen for every arquebusier. Le Roux explains this as a product of the greater professionalism in the royal army (due to the skill needed to wield a pike) in comparison with the rebel force.

==== Foreign aid ====
The Protestants looked to Elizabeth I of England and the German Protestant princes for support. Over the course of the war, Condé sent nine diplomatic missions to the Swiss cantons in the hope of support. The sieur de Soubise was in the cantons during July to this end. Geneva refused direct requests to recruit its citizens, pleading that they must maintain a technical neutrality as the city was threatened by the armies of the duc de Nemours and duke of Savoy. A diplomatic mission was sent to the duke of Savoy composed of Coligny's ward Téligny, to "inform him of the true nature of what had transpired at Wassy" in the hopes he would be at worst a neutral party to the conflict. Andelot was tasked with raising mercenaries for the army in the Holy Roman Empire. He was supported in this endeavour by Calvin, who chided the churches of France for their tight fistedness in providing financial support to Andelot's recruitment efforts.

=== Treaty of Hampton Court ===
As early as March, outreach had been conducted by the Protestant rebels towards the English, with the seigneur de Briquemault despatched by Coligny to negotiate. However, at the time nothing had come of it as England was not keen to jeopardise its commercial position in Spanish Netherlands. Elizabeth assured the Protestants of her moral support and desire to see their success. She was informed by her ambassador of the risk that Calais could fall to the Spanish. Eventually, however, Elizabeth began to see the prospect of regaining Calais and avoiding Spanish domination of France as worth the risk of intervention.

Negotiations were opened between the Protestants and the English on 15 August. The vidame de Chartres and a representative of Rouen were dispatched to treat with her. Elizabeth extracted humiliating terms from the two Protestant leaders. In return for her support, she demanded the restitution of Calais to English control, and until such time as they could provide Calais, she would take Le Havre as surety. In return, they would receive subsidies and men. In total this constituted 6,000 men and 100,000 écus (crowns). Le Havre would be returned, after both Calais and the loaned money had been returned to the English. Elizabeth promised that, should as a result of the treaty the leading Protestant nobles lose their French lands, she would afford them pensions and lands in England for their exile. The convention of Hampton Court was signed by the two parties on 20 September. Elizabeth took control of Le Havre on 29 August.

The seigneur de Briquemault urged Elizabeth to be patient in the receipt of Calais, arguing that it would be delivered at the time appointed by the Treaty of Cateau-Cambrésis; however, Elizabeth rejected this out of hand.

The treaty, which involved the surrender of French held towns to the English, was for Condé likely a temporary expedient, as evidenced by his involvement in the recapture of Le Havre from the English the following year. Mariéjol argues that in the heat of war, neither he nor Coligny may have looked too closely at the specific terms of the treaty. When the treaty was published in Orléans by the Protestant rebels, the terms that afforded the English control of Le Havre were excised from the translated text. Nevertheless, many gentlemen of the rebel cause were disquieted by the treaty. In response to the treaty, the seigneur de Morvilliers (governor of Boulogne and the commander of Rouen for the rebels) and the sieur de Genlis retired from the civil war. Genlis' retirement from the conflict brought his close friend Grammont under suspicion in the Protestant camp. The lieutenant-general of Picardy, the sieur de Sénarpont and his son also retired from Orléans to their estates in disgust.

=== Royal declarations ===
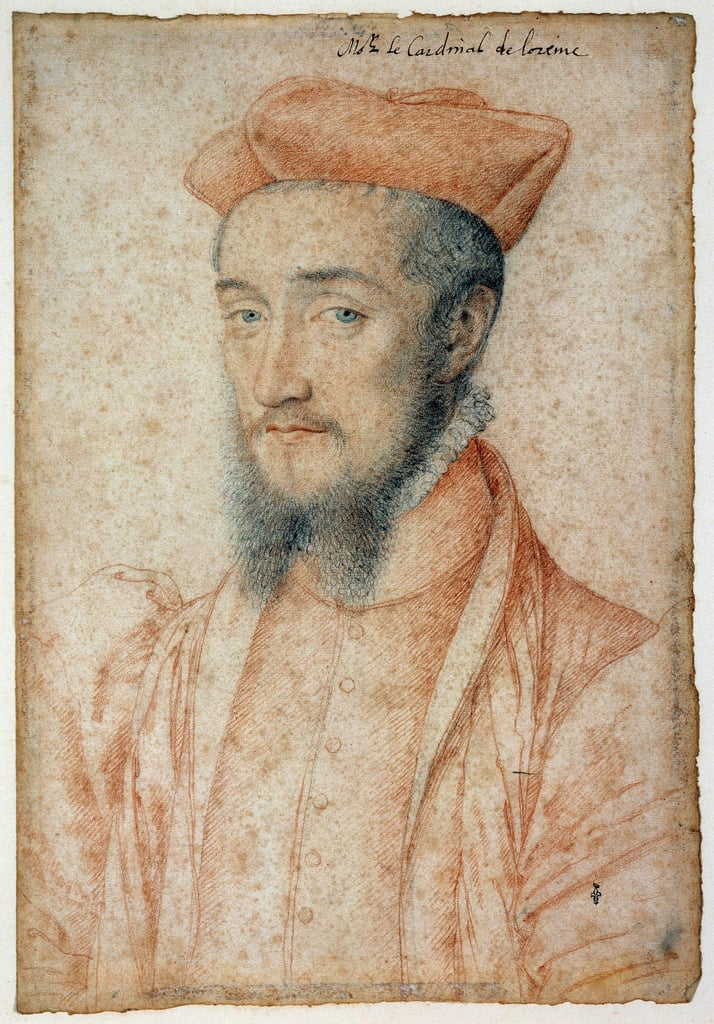
Charles, Cardinal of Lorraine who led the French delegation at the Council of Trent

During the summer, the cardinal de Lorraine devised a new Gallican confession of faith in which the Mass would be spoken in the vernacular, "idolatrous images" removed from churches and communion be taken in both kinds. Once the Sorbonne had corrected the translations, he also approved of the psalms being sung in French. By this means he approached the Lutheran position. It was intended that this would direct the position of the French delegates at the Council of Trent. This confession was developed in secret while the peace negotiations were ongoing, and would later be suppressed. Chancellor L'Hôpital sarcastically remarked that the first reform of the French church could be Lorraine resigning his benefices. According to a Protestant libel, Montmorency opposed the proposals in council and refused to sign. Carroll argues Navarre would have been a supporter of this confession of faith. Due to the disunity at court as to opinions on the confession, the plan could not be made public during a time of war. Lorraine would take this confession with him when he departed for the Council of Trent on 19 September.

On 27 July, the crown declared that all Protestants must return to observance of the Catholic faith. Coligny was declared by the crown to be a rebel at this time. All royal officials were to take an oath in favour of Catholicism, or lose their position. On 13 July, the parlement of Paris further permitted ordinary French citizens to kill heretics without fear of being prosecuted if they were committing iconoclasm or holding illicit assemblies. Condé reacted angrily to the declarations of the parlement, announcing that the body was under the control of Guise and his lackies on 8 August. On 18 August the parlement ordered that the arrest of Coligny, d'Andelot, La Rochefoucauld, the comte de Montgommery, Rohan, Genlis, Piennes and Morvilliers be undertaken, among other gentlemen. This would be furthered on 16 November when the admiral de Coligny was sentenced to death, his title of Admiral forfeited to his cousin Damville while his companies of soldiers were to be split among other cousins.

=== Condé's indecision ===
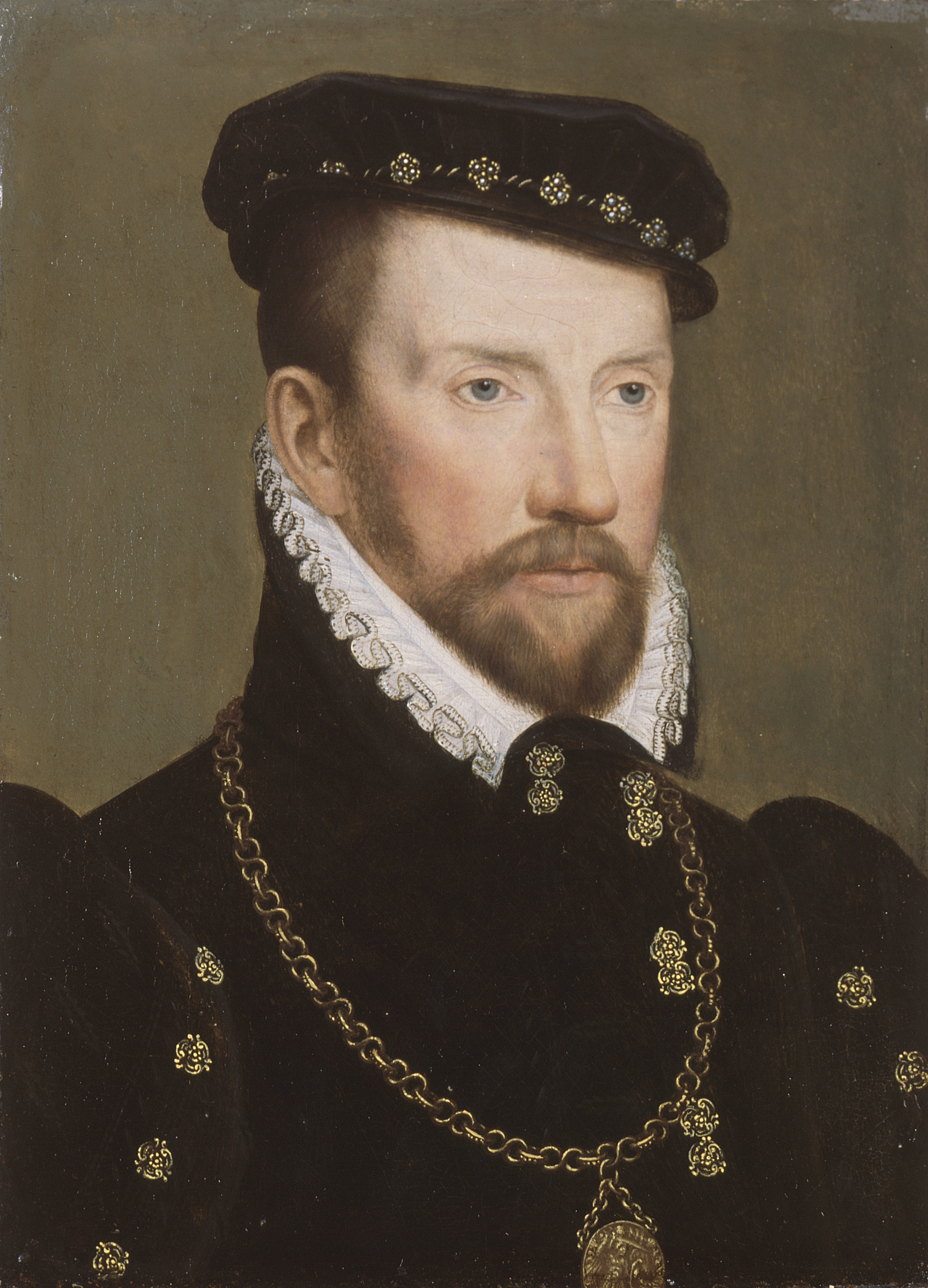
Gaspard II de Coligny, one of the senior leaders of the rebel cause during the First French War of Religion

With negotiations over, the first plan of the Protestant army was to launch a surprise attack on the royal army, which was stationed at Talcy. To this end, they set out on 2 July in the night, so that they might time their attack while the enemy was asleep. Coligny led the vanguard while Condé was with the rear. However, during the night the force became lost, and with dawn breaking they were spotted by the royal army. Therefore, the attack was reconsidered and the army turned towards Beaugency.

After his capture of Beaugency on 3 July, Condé became listless. With an army of around 9,000 men, he made his way back to Orléans. He variously considered joining forces with the baron des Adrets, the queen of Navarre or heading into Normandy to reinforce Rouen. In the end, lethargy prevailed, and he and Coligny locked themselves up in Orléans, the majority of their army dispatched into the provinces or discharged. Soubise departed for Lyon, Porcien for Strasbourg, d'Ivoy for Bourges, La Rochefoucauld for Poitou, d'Andelot for the Empire, and the comtesse de Roye departed for Strasbourg with Condé's children.

=== Royal capture of Blois, Tours and Bourges ===
==== Blois ====
Towards the end of June Navarre led the royal army out against Orléans. When it became clear that Condé had dispersed his captains to their provinces, the urgency of protecting Paris with such a thrust dissipated. Navarre submitted a memorandum to Catherine by which he proposed dividing the royal army into four, with small columns under the ducs d'Aumale and Montpensier and Marshal Saint-André to secure Rouen, Guyenne and Lyon respectively while the main royal army focused on Orléans. The estimates involved in the plan totalled the royal army at 46,000 men and relied on the involvement of many foreign mercenaries to reach. Catherine approved the commanders and the plan but cautioned against the reliance on mercenaries. The strength of the force that would be present for the recapture of Blois would be roughly 23,350, comprising 17,000 infantry and somewhat over 5,000 cavalry. The royal army also boasted around 22 artillery pieces.

In the end, the main royal army under Navarre's authority turned its attentions to clearing the Loire, securing first Blois on 4 July; the town was sacked and pillaged with much the same brutality as Beaugency had been by the Protestants. The grandees of Blois had come to Guise with the keys of the city, only for him to gesture at his cannon and inform him that this was his key.

==== Tours ====
Tours fell next to the royal army. Montpensier, back in charge of his city, had monks draw up a confession of faith which all inhabitants were to swear to uphold before witnesses or be put to death. On 17 July, around 200 Protestants of the city were knocked out and then drowned in the Loire. One notable of the city was disembowelled and had his head thrown into the Loire, while his heart was paraded around on a pole.

==== Bourges ====
The royal army then crossed the Loire for the purpose of an attack on Bourges. Bourges was put to siege on 19 August. The city boasted a strong garrison of around 3,500 men who enjoyed plentiful provisions; even with a garrison of this size, however, the walls were of great length. The royal artillery had now been augmented to around 30 pieces. While the siege was ongoing, Coligny succeeded in a surprise attack on a train of 6 large artillery pieces that was making its way towards Bourges while it was on the road from Chartres. He was, however, unable to bring back the artillery to Orléans as the draft animals had fled, so he had it burned in a large bonfire. This attack and the loss of the royal powder had the potential to reverse the fate of Bourges; however, the siege was concluded before word of Coligny's coup arrived. Bourges fell on 31 August for the royal cause, the culmination of a rapid series of conquests. The city was taken, not by military means but by negotiation, the Protestant commander the sieur d'Ivoy capitulating the city after an interview with Catherine in return for his troops departing in honour. He renounced his oath to Condé as part of the capitulation. The city itself paid an indemnity of 50,000 livres (pounds) in return for securing "life, property and liberty of conscience" to those of the city. While this was generally observed, the German mercenary commander did not abide by it. The capture of Bourges severed the Protestant forces on the Loire from their southern compatriots. It was a disaster for the Protestant war effort. Durot argues that it was Guise and not Navarre who was the architect of the victory at Bourges.

4,000 Spanish soldiers provided by Felipe II arrived in Bordeaux at this time (10 August). On 1 September, Catherine and the king entered Bourges. With the fall of Bourges, the road to Orléans was open. At this time Navarre departed to the court of the duchess of Ferrara at Montargis where his son the prince de Béarn, future king Henri IV was staying for his safety. Navarre was potentially concerned his son could either be kidnapped by his brother the prince de Condé or alternatively handed over as a hostage to the Spanish. The duchess of Ferrara had established herself back in France in 1560 and acted as a protector to Protestants. The young prince de Béarn had come down with measles, and while Navarre was present, he asked permission to join his father on campaign; Navarre refused.

The royal army debated how to follow up their successes of the preceding months. Navarre advocated an immediate push on Orléans. He found himself opposed on this due to the plague that was blighting Orléans, and the crown's hopes that he might be able to secure the city without a fight by achieving the defection of his brother. Indeed, de Bèze would later claim that 10,000 died in the city as a result of the terrible conditions at this time. There was also the risk of an English invasion. This caused the royal army to reorientate their direction north, to stop further incursion into Normandy. The army decided to attack Rouen, both due to the risk of English support linking up with the Protestants and the potential ability of the controller of Rouen to strangle Paris' supply. While the main royal army would move towards Rouen, a blocking force would be left around Orléans.

=== Royal reduction of Rouen and the death of Navarre ===
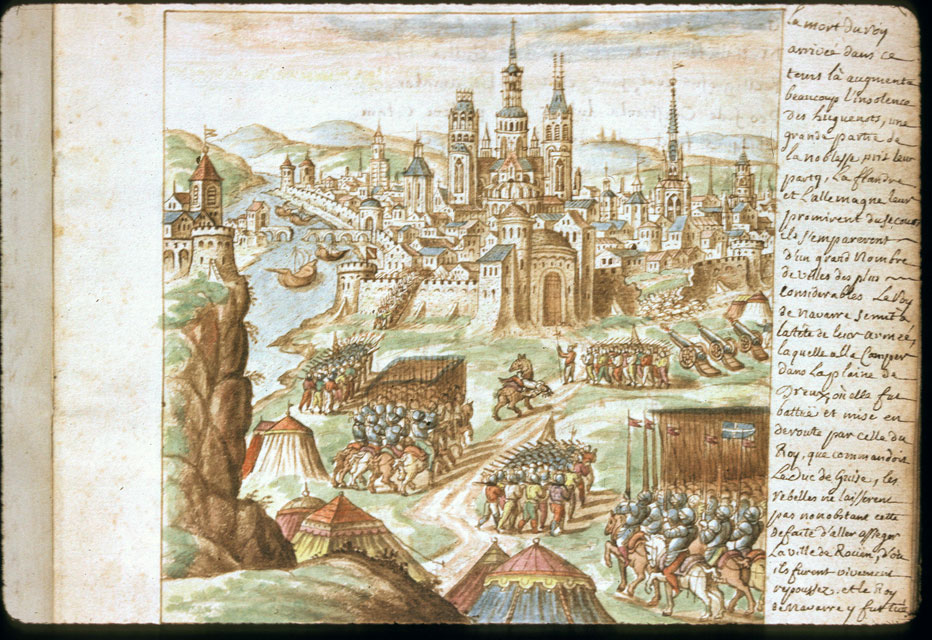
Siege of Rouen at which the royalists attained a major victory, at the cost of the death of the lieutenant-general of the kingdom, the king of Navarre

Having rejoined the royal army, Navarre and the duc de Guise took joint command for the reduction of Rouen. Their army at this time totalled around 30,000 men in strength with 45 artillery pieces and 3,000 pioneers among its number. Rouen's defence was led by the comte de Montgomery. The Protestant commander had at his disposal a garrison of around 4,000 men. His force was undisciplined and had previously brutalised sympathetic elements of the population of Dieppe. Therefore, requests had gone out to Coligny for his replacement with Charles de Bacqueville. The Protestant hold of the city was a particular threat as it was to be reinforced by a force of English soldiers dispatched by Elizabeth I. Elizabeth I’s support to the city would be weak, however, and by the time the first 200 soldiers arrived on 4 October, the city had already been invested. She did not at first put much priority on support of the Protestants in the city, more focused on the prospect of receipt of Calais; however, it became apparent as October continued that if the royalist forces were successful at Rouen, then the English hold of Le Havre could be jeopardised. Therefore, six ships were dispatched up the Seine, of which five made it into the city, providing around 600 men.

The combined leaders of the royal army succeeded first in seizing the fortress of Sainte-Catherine, which offered great command over Rouen on 6 October. Catherine joined the leaders in the fort after it fell so that she might observe the progress of the siege herself. This caused Guise and Montmorency to warn her of the dangers, which she dismissed. With Fort Sainte-Catherine secured, Catherine again pushed for a negotiated settlement with Rouen, little desiring to see one of the kingdom's richest cities subject to a sack. Many merchants and bourgeois in the city were willing to compromise, but the comte de Montgomery and the more radical elements of Rouen's defence (Protestant refugees who had fled from elsewhere in Normandy and in Maine) refused the offers. Sainte-Catherine was turned into an artillery battery which could bombard the ramparts where the attack was to be made. Both commanders (Guise and Navarre) were in the habit of walking through the frontline trenches in the manner of the common soldier, and it was on one of these visits on 16 October that Navarre was pierced by an arquebus shot from the city. The wound was not initially considered to be fatal, but doctors, including the famed surgeon Ambroise Paré, were unable to remove the bullet. Guise was also wounded during the course of the siege.

Guise continued the siege, and several days later stormed into Rouen on 26 October. Those Protestant leaders who could fled by ship, scattering across Normandy. Among those who escaped was Montgomery, who took a galley down the Seine, leaving behind his wife and children in the city. The governor of Normandy, the duc de Bouillon, allowed him to depart. Guise tried to prevent his soldiers from sacking Rouen, promising a bonus in pay for the successful conclusion of the operation, but it was of no use. The city was subject to a brutal pillaging with much killing and raping. Protestant houses were looted, and the Catholic residents had to hurriedly return so they could bribe the soldiers not to sack their houses. Even Catholic churches were subject to the violent pillage. After three days, the sacking ceased. The Spanish ambassador estimated that there had been around 1,000 casualties among the defenders and population. From the surrounding area, merchants came to Rouen so that they could buy up the looted property the soldiers had secured.

The Protestant sieur de Randan, brother of La Rochefoucauld, was a high-profile Protestant casualty of the siege. In retaliation for the murder of several high-profile Protestants during the sacking of Rouen, Condé ordered the execution of an abbot and a parlementaire who were in his captivity.

Navarre was carried in a litter for the victorious army's entrance into the defeated city. Over the next month Navarre slowly faded away until, on 16 November, while on a barge to be transported back to the capital, he died. In his final moments, he expressed interest in Lutheranism and urged a valet who was with him to serve his son well and for his son to serve the king well. He would be succeeded as governor of Guyenne by his young son. Condé claimed that he succeeded his brother as lieutenant-general of the kingdom, but the crown resolved to transfer the deceased prince's authority to the cardinal de Bourbon.

For some Protestants, Navarre's death was a punishment from god and they ridiculed the circumstances of his fatal injury. The seigneur de Soubise remarked that it was the comeuppance for those who rejected the grace of God.

With the reduction of Rouen, many royal troops were dismissed for the winter, on the assumption the campaign season would go dormant until the following spring.

=== German reiters ===
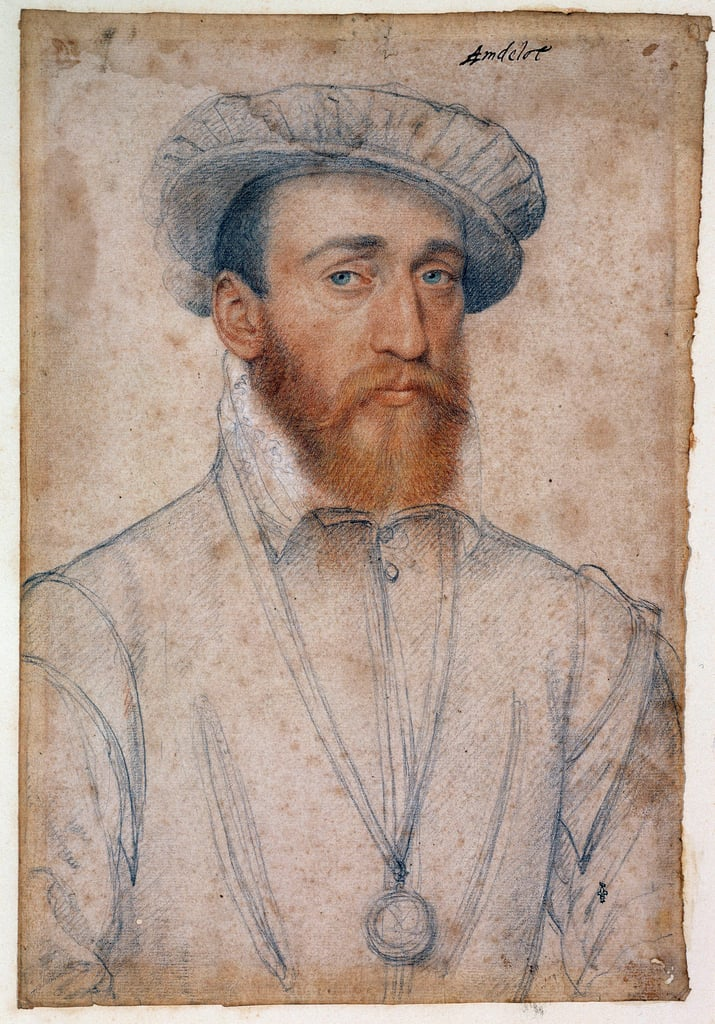
Seigneur d'Andelot, brother of admiral de Coligny who hired and led the German mercenaries for the rebel cause

On 22 September, d'Andelot crossed the Rhine on his way back to France with the force of German mercenaries he had been able to recruit in the Empire. This force numbered around 7,300 men. It was composed of roughly 4,000 landsknechts and 3,000 reiters. They had been recruited from three principal sources: Philip I, Landgrave of Hesse, the duke of Württemberg (whom Guise had met with in February), and Frederick III, Elector Palatine, who was converting from Lutheranism to Calvinism in 1562. After tarrying for a while in Strasbourg while d'Andelot was wracked with illness and struggling for money, the force made its way into France. They entered the kingdom at Montéclair and made their way through Champagne, passing by Chaumont and pillaging the Franciscan monastery near Châteauvillain where they took 300 captives. The prince de Porcien joined with the mercenary army as it made its progress. Saint-André was ordered to take much of the royal army's cavalry and the blocking force around Orléans to intercept d'Andelot. Nevers, Aumale and Saint-André were entrusted with the duty of stopping the forces' advance; to do this, they were allowed to levy forces in Champagne and Burgundy; however, they were unable to intercept d'Andelot's army. Aumale's cautious reticence to engage the mercenaries led to much criticism from his soldiers. Nevers was accused by the English ambassador of having consented to the mercenaries passing by him. The mercenaries made their way into Orléans to join up with the main rebel army, with which they achieved junction on 6 November. D'Andelot had to be escorted into the city on a litter due to his exhaustion.

Shortly before the arrival of the mercenary army into Orléans, both La Rochefoucauld and Duras had arrived in the city. The former with 300 horsemen while the latter brought what was left of his army after the savaging it had received at the battle of Vergt.

To fund this mercenary army, the Protestant rebels had to impose a taille (land tax) upon the populations they controlled. This was complemented with looting of churches and the melting down of their precious metals.

=== Manoeuvrers ===
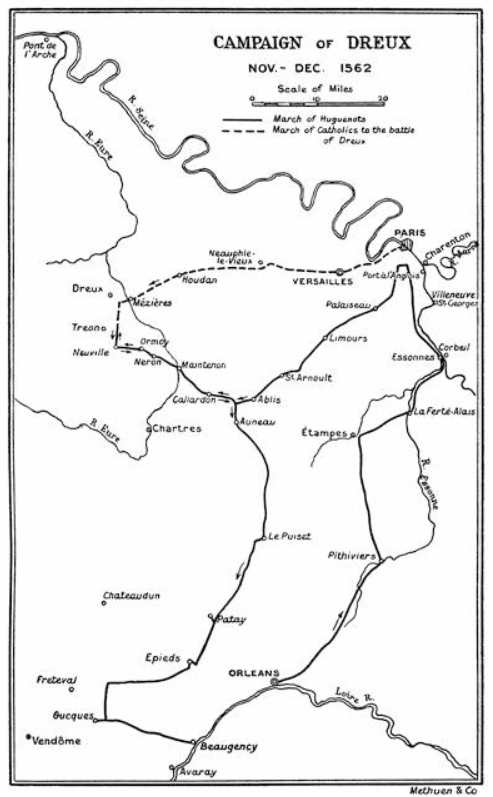
Movement of the royal and rebel armies beginning with Louis I, Prince of Condé's departure from Orléans and terminating at the return to the city of Gaspard II de Coligny with the remnants of the rebel army

With the successful conclusion of the Rouen siege, Guise planned first to march further into Normandy and drive the English from their hold of Le Havre. However, on 8 November, Condé emerged from Orléans and made a thrust towards Paris with the support of the recently returned d'Andelot and his mercenaries. In total the rebel army numbered around 20,000. Shortly before he departed, a Protestant minister urged him to purge his army of "thieves and fornicators" so that they might avoid god's wrath. The first town on the path to Paris was Pithiviers, which was conquered on 11 November, with the garrison being spared for their having surrendered while the priests of the town were executed. The sieur de Gonnor was dispatched by Catherine to treat with Condé and he arrived at the Protestant camp at Pithiviers, offering acceptance of the Protestants' religious demands in return for the prince assuring the kingdom would be rid of Germans and the English. Assurances were demanded, however, and nothing came of the proposal. In Thompson's estimation, the negotiations were not undertaken in good faith. The army returned to the advance and succeeded in capturing Étampes (an important grain depot) on 13 November and Montlhéry. This accomplished, Condé looked to capture Corbeil, beginning a siege of the settlement on 16 November. Corbeil was, however, strongly defended, with command led by Saint-André (who had rushed into Corbeil before the Protestants could close the siege lines) and this slowed Condé's progress. Condé was also slowed by his army's propensity for sacking every village on the approaches to Paris.

Negotiations were undertaken once more a little while later, largely in service of slowing Condé's advance. These took place at the port Langlois and in a mill in the faubourg Saint-Marceau. The talks were conducted between the Constable for the royalists and his nephew Coligny for the rebels.

On 27 November Coligny led the vanguard of the rebel army in an attempted surprise attack on the Parisian faubourgs of Saint-Marceau and Saint-Victor; however, it was easily rebuffed. With this a failure, an attempt to surround the capital was undertaken in the final days of November. Porcien established himself at Gentilly, Genlis with the infantry at Montrouge and Vaugirard, Coligny and Condé at Arcueil and the German mercenaries at Cachan. The royalists refused battle and instead returned to negotiations designed to buy time to build further forces. Resolving to initiate the fight themselves, Coligny decided to undertake another night-time assault on 5 December; however, as with the prior attempt at this plan, the force got lost in the dark and dawn broke; therefore, the plan was called off. A further plan for battle on 6 December was called off after Condé began to fear that Genlis had revealed the plans of attack to the royalists in the city. Instead of planning further assaults, it was agreed among the rebel Protestant leadership to withdraw from the city.

=== Paris ===
In Paris, as Condé began his thrust, the Parisians planned radical means of defence. The suburbs were to be rased to provide clean lines of fire, reinforce the fortifications and bring in more troops. The Venetian ambassador notes how little of this came to pass. Paris was short on food as a result of extended rains during the summer. As a result of this, the price of bread rose greatly. Prices increased further after the loss of Étampes and with refugees flooding into the city from Paris' surrounds. On 6 December, the Paris militia was requested to join with Guise, who was holding the faubourg Saint-Jacques, due to the failure of royal reinforcements to arrive as expected. After Spanish and Gascon troops arrived, Condé decided he could not negotiate an advantageous settlement and decided to withdraw from the capital on 9 December. Condé was despondent at his failures in front of Paris.

=== Drive north ===
==== Protestant march ====
On the morning of 10 December, the Protestant army decamped from Paris and began making towards Chartres. The march was slowed by issues with their artillery train, which necessitated stopping the progress for two days at Saint-Arnoult. The Protestant army had little hope of crossing the river Seine, as the Pont de l'Arche was watched by royalist German mercenaries. An assault on Chartres was floated for a time, until it became clear both how large a garrison the city possessed and the fact that the royal army was in close pursuit. The two commanders, Condé and Coligny, were increasingly in opposition to one another as to how they should proceed. On 16 December the army held council at the village of Ablis. Condé argued that now the royal army had left Paris, they should swing round and attack the weakly defended city, trapping the royal army in front of Étampes. Coligny meanwhile wished to head into Normandy to get pay for the German mercenaries and unify with the English troops from Le Havre, thereby resolving their numerical deficiencies. It would be Coligny's plan that was adopted and the army crossed the Eure near Maintenon on 17 December. The army fell into confusion at this point, with the main body under Condé ending up in front of the vanguard that was under Coligny. A day was spent re-establishing the order of the army.

Scouts sent out on 18 December reported the royal army had crossed the Eure and would be on the flank of the intended march for 19 December. This turned out to be a false alarm. Condé and Coligny again came into disagreement, the former expecting battle while the latter felt that the royal army wouldn't dare give battle with their cavalry inferiority. They began a march towards Tréon, but without leaving scouts on the river crossing. By this means it was only at 10:00 that they became aware the royal army was drawn up on the planned right flank of their march.

==== Royal march ====
The royal army departed Paris on 11 December, numbering around 19,000 men. Due to the cavalry inferiority, they took a northern route out of Paris, relying on bad roads and poor country to allow their infantry to grant them safety. For a while, Guise was established at Poissy as the royal army shadowed that of the Protestants. Once it became clear that the Protestants were heading into Normandy, word was sent to Paris that battle might be given in the next 4/5 days. The Constable, Saint-André and Guise were keen to gain royal permission for open battle with fellow Frenchmen. According to Castelnau, Catherine sarcastically noted that such experienced captains were asking the opinions of a woman and a child. More formally, in the royal council the next day, it was established that battle would be at the commander's discretion.

The royal army was forced to halt at Mézières on 18 December both due to an illness Montmorency was experiencing and due to the late hour in the day making a crossing inadvisable. The army sent some scouts across the river, which were observed by the Protestant army, causing a false panic that the royal army had crossed the Eure. Having rested, the royal army began crossing the Eure around midnight and the entire army was across the river before dawn. A line was established between the villages of Nuisement and Le Lucate. Soon the royal scouts reported that the sound of Protestant drummers could be heard near Imberdais to the south.

Saint-André, Guise and Montmorency therefore held council and it was agreed that it would be necessary to force the Protestants to give battle by blocking their line of march. The baggage was left at Nuisement and the army advanced southwards to positions anchored on the villages of Épinay and Blainville.

==== Drawing up ====
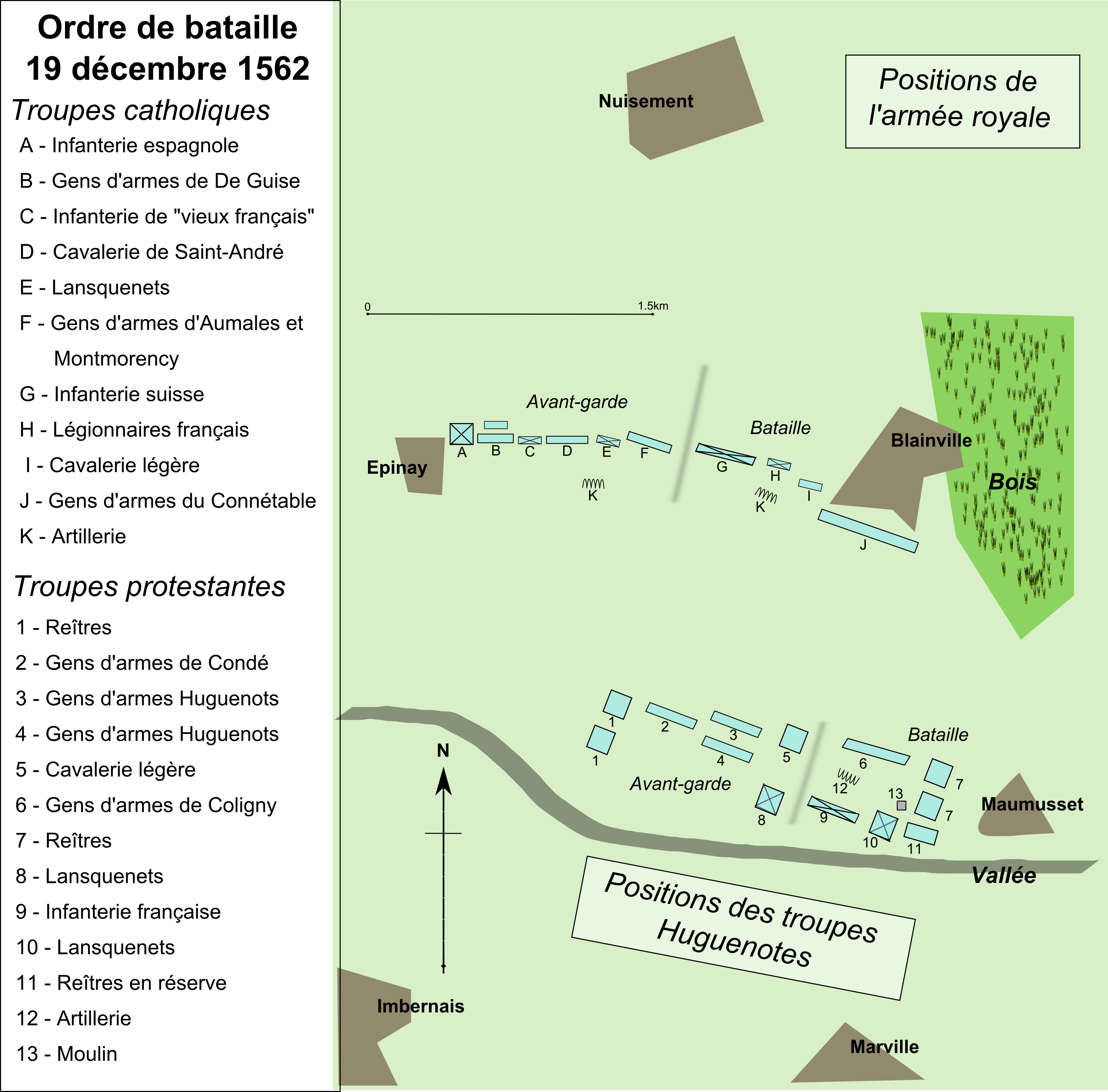
Order of battle for the two armies at Dreux

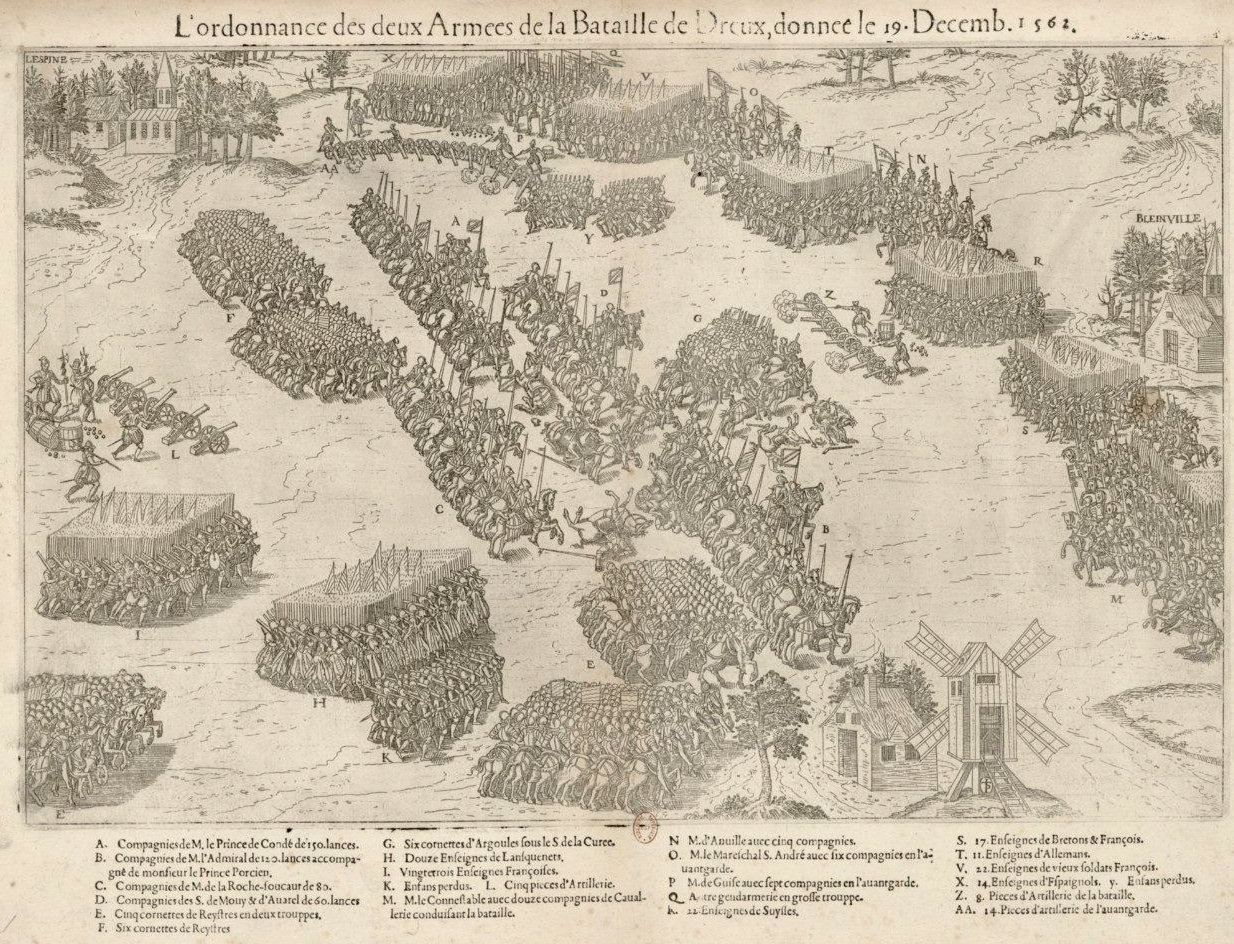
Contemporary illustration of the order of battle

Now realising their situation, the Protestants formed up into a line in front of Imberdais. D'Andelot was dispatched to report on the royal positions, and reported back that they were too strong to attack, with the royalists outnumbering them. D'Andelot advised that they withdraw to Tréon. The two armies stood opposite one another for two hours. During this long wait, the leaders of both sides could consider with horror the number of their friends and relatives in the opposing army's ranks. The Constable was directly across the field from his nephews; meanwhile, the Protestant writer François de La Noue noted that he was opposite a dozen of his friends. Coligny convinced Condé that the royalists would not give battle, and that they should continue their march. Therefore, the Protestant advance guard began to disengage from the line and begin progress towards Tréon. However, some reiters and light cavalry screening the advance guard's march were subject to artillery fire from a battery of 14 guns and scattered. Condé thus determined it was not safe to disengage and recalled the advance guard to form back up in the line.

The royal army totalled around 14,000 infantry with 2,000 cavalry (of which roughly half were German mercenaries). They had also brought 22 artillery pieces. On the royal army's right flank at Épinay were the advanced guard led by Saint-André and Guise: Spanish infantry to the extreme right, then Guise's gendarmes (200 strong with an almost equal number of volunteers), then French infantry under the vicomte de Martigues, then cavalry under Saint-André, then German landsknecht, then Damville and Aumale's gendarme companies. The advance guard was at least nominally under Saint-André's authority, with Guise only responsible for his gendarmes; however, Carroll argues he had de facto control of the whole wing, with Saint-André deferring to him in strategic matters. Alongside Aumale, Guise's other brothers, the marquis d'Elbeuf and the Grand Prior, were also among the royal ranks. The main battle followed under Montmorency's command, first the Swiss pikeman (the largest unit in the field), then more French infantry (Breton and Picard 'legions'), then light dragoon cavalry under the seigneur de Sansac. Finally on the army’s extreme left was Montmorency with the rest of the gendarmerie. In front of the army were two artillery positions, one in front of the advanced guard (of 14 cannons), the other on the left flank of the Swiss (of 8 cannons). By integrating their cavalry with the infantry, the royal army hoped to overcome their inferiority in this aspect of the army.

The Protestant force numbered around 8,000 infantry, with 5,000 cavalry. Their army was arrayed in two lines, with Condé in charge of the main battle on the left while Coligny commanded the advanced guard on the right. In the first line (which was solely cavalry), from left: on the extreme left two units of reiters, then Condé's gendarmerie, then two more gendarme regiments one behind the other, then a unit of light cavalry, then Coligny's gendarmes, finally on the army's extreme right, two more units of reiters. In total, there were around 4,500 horses in the army. In the second line, the body was composed of French infantry, with two units of landsknechts on each side and a reserve unit of reiters on the far right. The Protestant artillery was in front of the French infantry.

=== Dreux ===
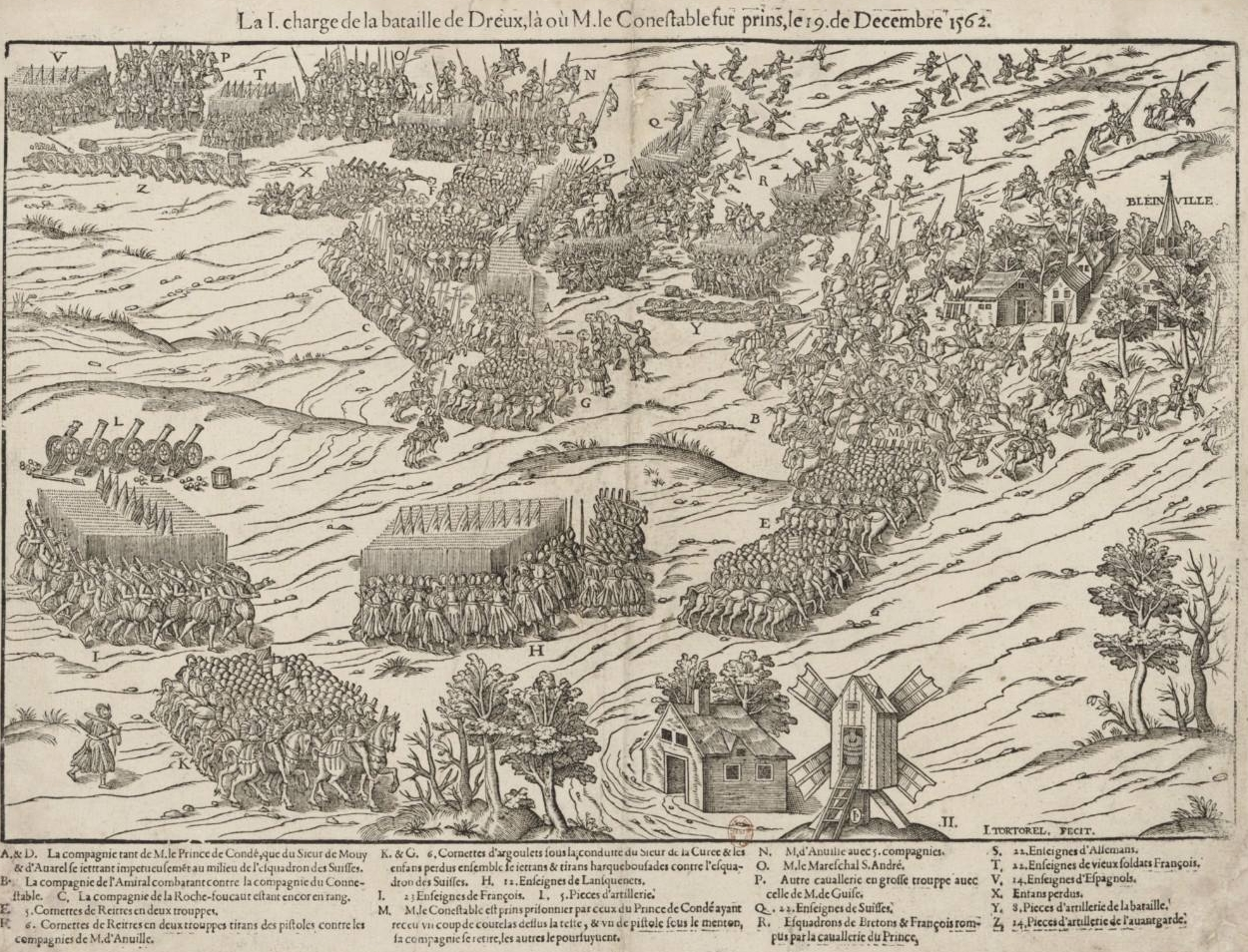
Charge of Louis I, Prince of Condé into constable Montmorency's gendarmes

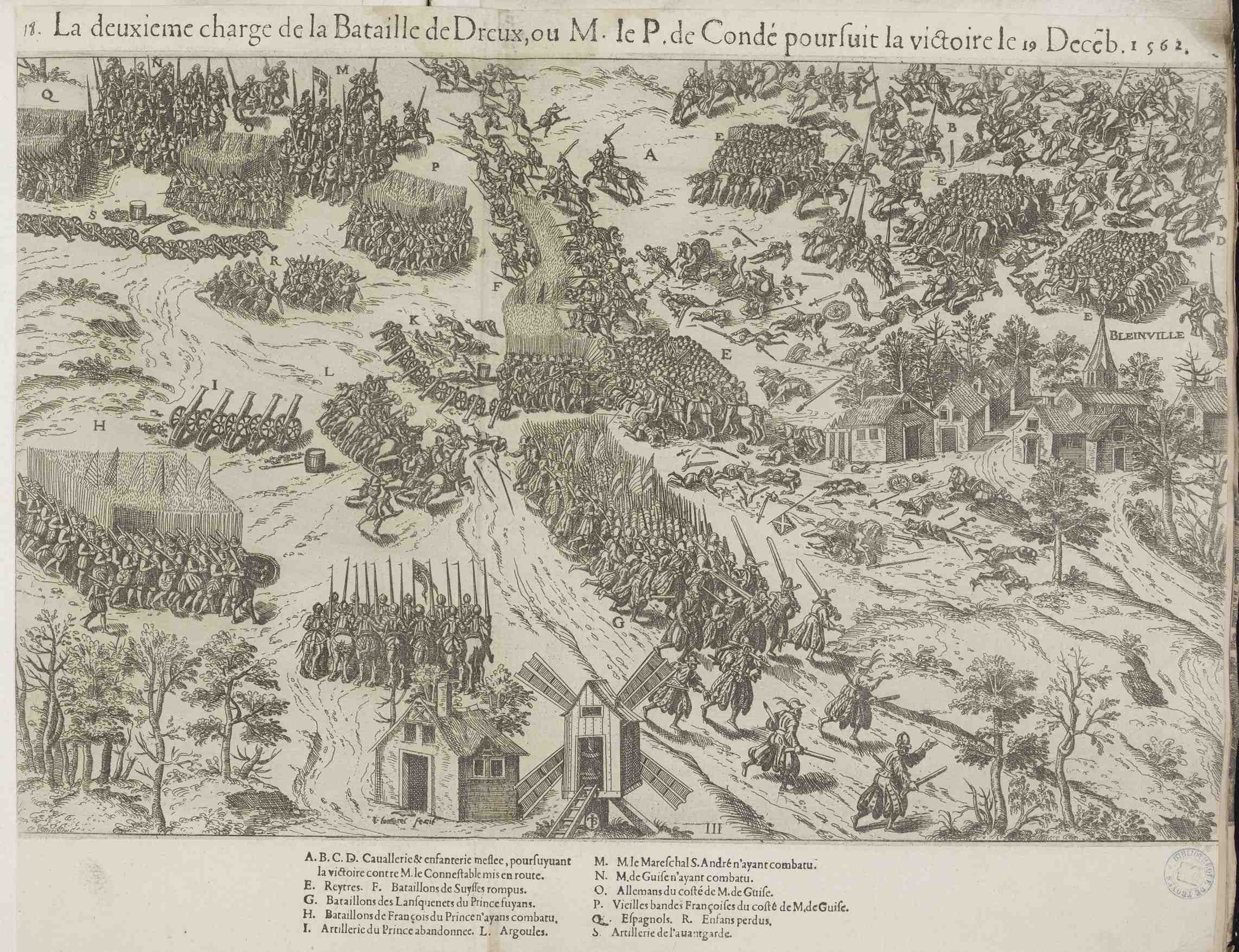
Pursuit of the shattered gendarmes of the Constable Anne de Montmorency

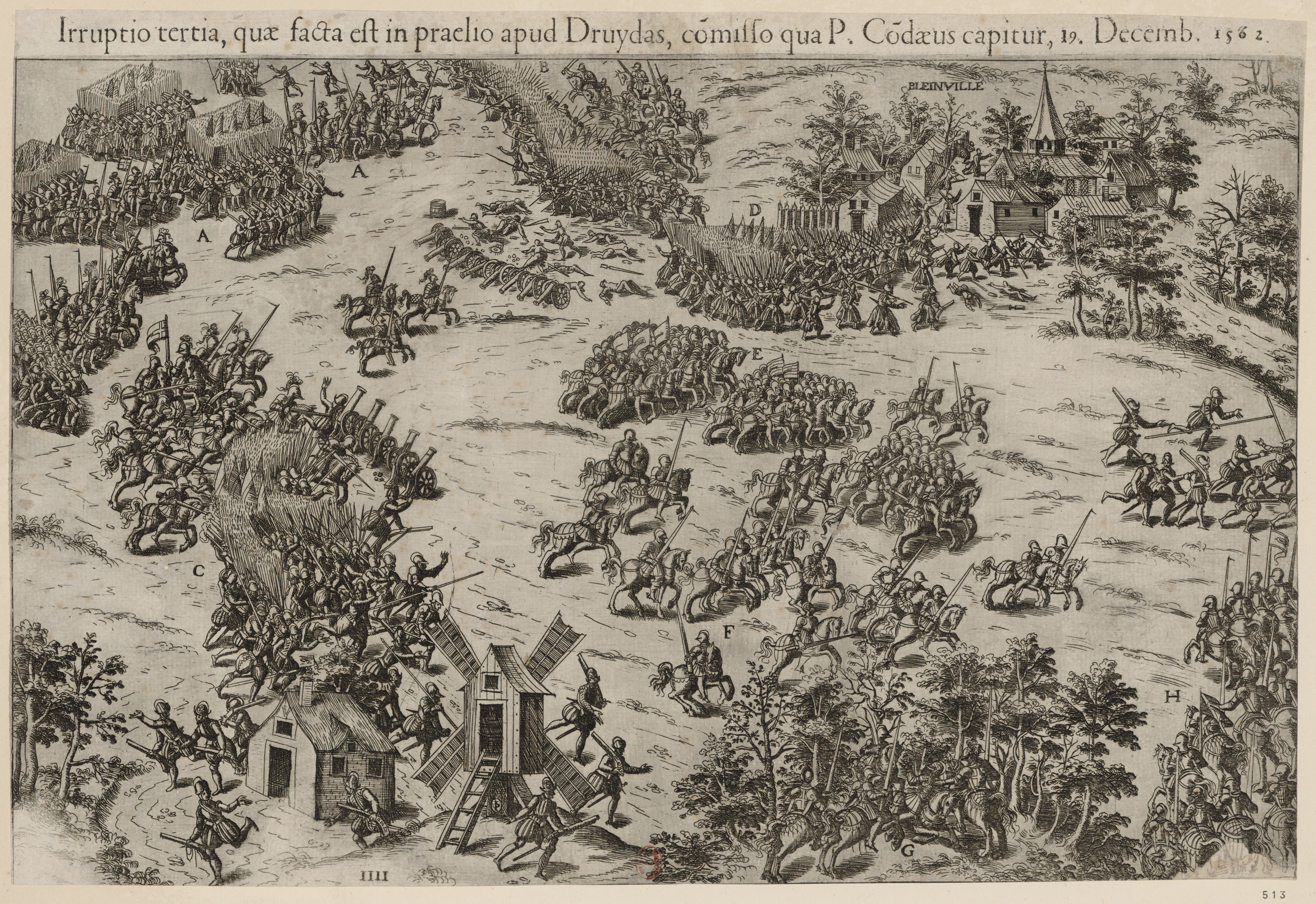
Capture of Louis I, Prince of Condé

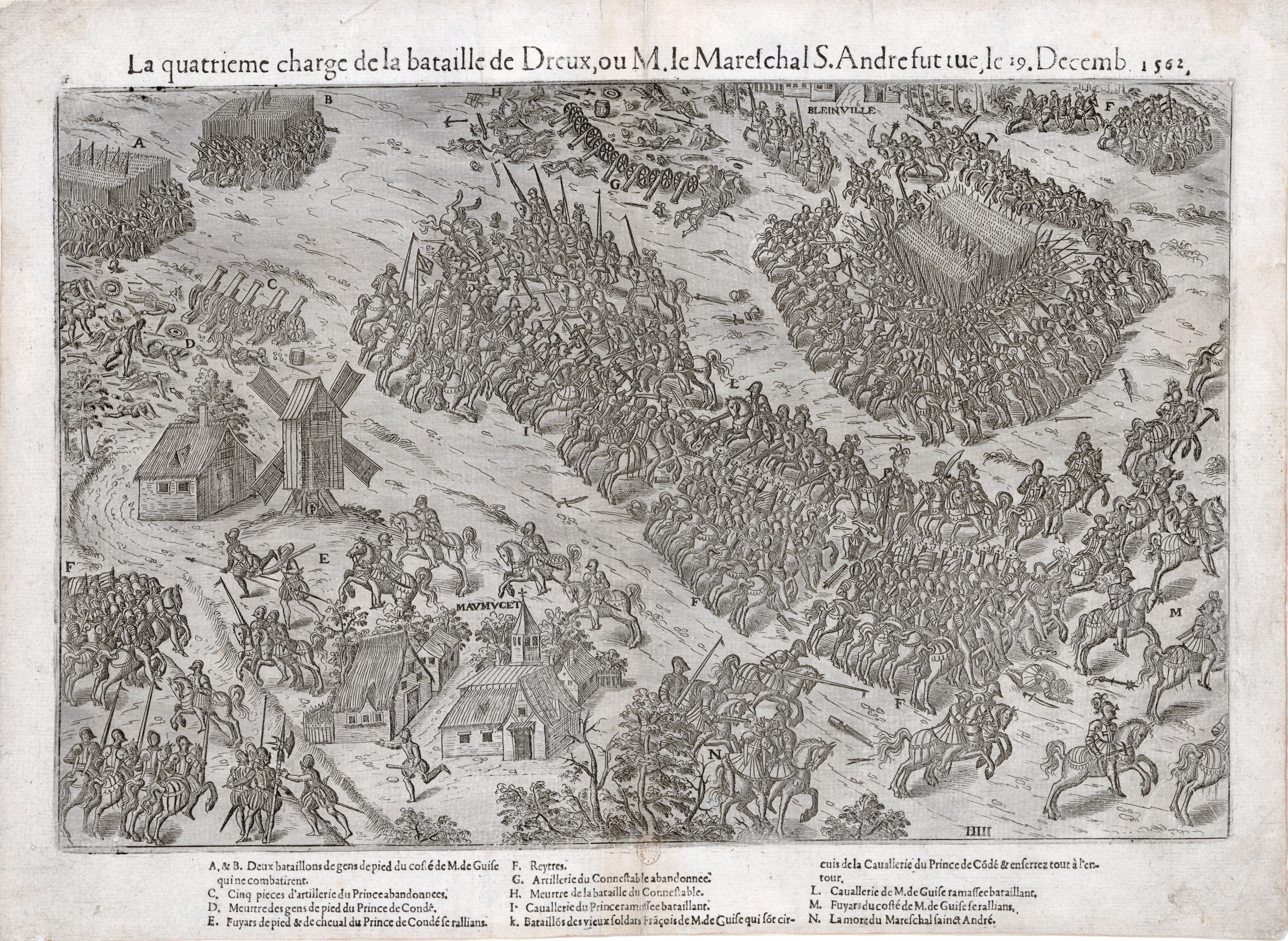
Gaspard II de Coligny's final charge against François, Duke of Guise and Jacques d'Albon's gendarmes and the veteran infantry square; featuring Jacques d'Albon's murder by the sieur de Bobigny

The battle began with a charge of the Protestant cavalry into the royal left under Montmorency's command. The aggressive cavalry charges of the Protestants were necessitated by their comparative paucity in artillery. Condé's cavalry charged into the Swiss phalanx and succeeded in penetrating it; Coligny's cavalry meanwhile drove into the cavalry under Montmorency and succeeded in routing it, capturing Montmorency. After his capture, Montmorency was quickly hurried back to Orléans with a guard of reiters on Coligny's orders for fear that he might escape. Prior to his capture, Montmorency had requested support from Guise as his position collapsed, but Guise declined to advance in support. Montmorency was wounded in the jaw during the fight. Montmorency's son the sieur de Montbéron, was killed in the combat by an écuyer (squire) of the prince de Condé with whom he had recently quarrelled. Montbéron's brother Damville rode across to Guise and furiously demanded that he avenge the death. Guise assured him that while there would be a time for revenge, it was not at this moment. The royal Breton and Picard legions disintegrated, and the Protestant cavalry pursued the collapsing left wing back to the Eure. Only the Swiss remained on the field for the left; Damville and Aumale attempted to protect them, only to be themselves routed by the Protestant reiters. Aumale was thrown from his horse and wounded in the shoulder.

During this time, the royal right was almost entirely inactive, except for a force under the baron de Biron which shielded those on the left who had rallied and protected the royal rear from being attacked from behind by Protestant cavalry.

The Protestant attack moved to focus on the Swiss, who were subject to a second attack by Protestant cavalry returning from the chase of the routed. One of the German landsknecht units attempted to engage the Swiss but was fiercely charged and fled back to the village of Blainville, where they barricaded themselves in a courtyard. Fresh off this victory, the Swiss attempted to recapture the royal artillery but were subjected to a new series of cavalry charges, which broke them into small units, forcing the Swiss to retreat. Delighted, the Protestant German reiters began to cry "victory!" and make towards the royal baggage. This confounded Condé and Coligny, who knew much of the royal army had yet to be committed, but their cavalry was now dispersed across the field.

With their enemies' cavalry scattered, the royal right now acted; their advance at first swept the Protestants from the field. Some contemporaries alleged that Guise's late entry into the battle was a result either of cowardice or a desire to see his rivals for military command eliminated. Wood sees it as an example of "modern generalship". Gendarmes and the Spanish infantry attacked the French infantry. After some volleys of fire from the Spanish, the rear of the infantry broke and the front was left to be slaughtered. The other landsknecht unit, seeing what was unfolding, retired from the field without engaging. The cavalry fought on, but Condé was at last forced to retreat into the woods to the east of the battlefield; during the retreat, he was captured (his horse having been shot out from under him, he was made the prisoner of the baron de Damville).

With the battle seemingly over, Guise went to Blainville to negotiate the surrender of the landsknechts who had barricaded themselves in the courtyard. However, behind the woods, Coligny was able to rally around 1,000 French and German cavalry into a new line and advanced through the woods to the royal positions. Upon their emergence, it was initially thought these were more Protestants who wished to surrender. However, once battle was joined, it initially seemed possible that the Protestants could triumph. Marshal de Saint-André was captured by a former servant of his named the sieur de Bobigny, who had years previously killed another of Saint-André's servants. Saint-André had attempted to prosecute Bobigny for this crime, and had hung an effigy of the noble after his flight, also seeing to the seizure of his property. Bobigny refused to turn his prize over to his commanding officer, the prince de Porcien, who consented to Bobigny maintaining Saint-André's ransom. Bobigny then shot Saint-André in the face. Guise, however, had wisely kept more reserves and ordered the veteran infantry under Martigues to engage at the decisive moment. They formed a square south of Blainville and brutalised the approaching cavalry (which had already used its lances for the destruction of the Swiss) with arquebus fire. Unable to break the formation, Coligny ordered a retreat from the field. He was briefly pursued, but only for a few minutes.

==== Aftermath of battle ====
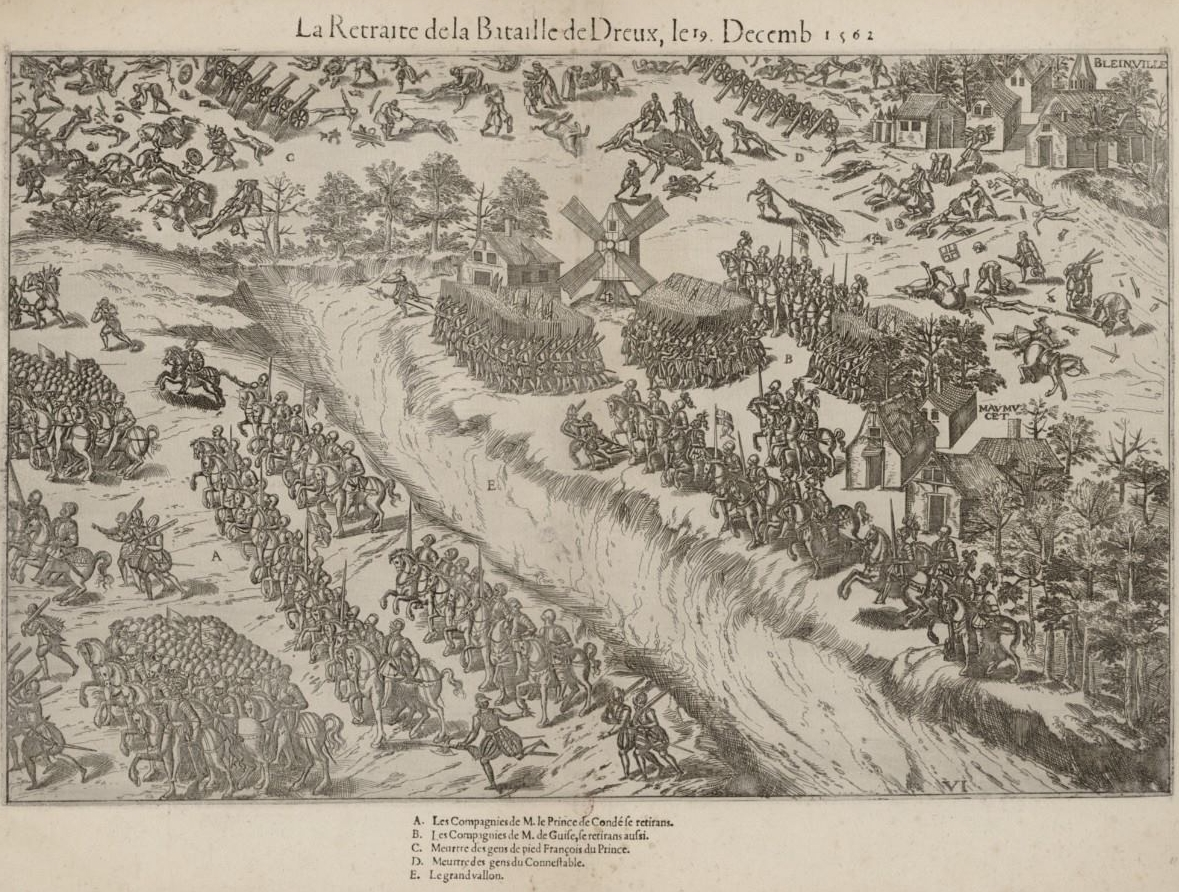
Gaspard II de Coligny's withdrawal from the field

It was initially reported that the Protestant forces had won the battle and that Montmorency and Guise were dead; however, soon accurate word of what had transpired spread. Catherine and her sons travelled to Paris on 22 December, where they heard Te Deums in celebration of the victory. Twenty two of Condé's standards were transported for display in Notre-Dame. L'Hôpital took a different view of the battlefield victory, seeing it as a source of embitterment among the defeated, who would return to their places of refuge only further inflamed. Protestantism could not be defeated on the battlefield for the chancellor.

In the days following the battle, both Coligny and the English ambassador would write to Elizabeth that while they had by conventional metrics lost the battle, in terms of the loss of noble gentlemen of note, they had in fact triumphed. Coligny further argued that he had withdrawn from the field in good order and had in fact returned to the field the next day to give battle again only to be denied. While characterising the letters as damage control, Wood agrees with this assessment as regards noble casualties, and highlights how poorly the royalist cavalry had been handled during the battle. Of the seven tactical units the royal cavalry had been divided into, six were either routed from the field or mauled. 7 of the 36 gendarme companies who participated in the battle for the royalist side were either killed on the field or fatally wounded, with another 4/5 seriously wounded or captured. In terms of high-profile Protestant noble casualties, La Rochefoucauld was seriously wounded during the combat.

For the Protestants, their infantry was devastated, with at least half of it casualties. The mercenary forces of d'Andelot surrendered without fighting. 1,500 of the German mercenaries were dispatched back to the Empire, while the remainder were incorporated into the royal army. Despite being defeated, the Protestants managed to inflict close to equal casualty numbers on the significantly numerically superior force. According to Carroll of the 8,000 casualties 2/3 of them were royalist. The royalists had lost around 500 nobles. Of the royal Swiss, there were around 1,000 casualties, including their colonel and most of their officers. Wood argues that at a conservative estimate there were 6,000 dead; he also notes that there were few survivors who were seriously wounded, as most who fit this description succumbed to the cold of the winter night.

Coligny retreated with the remainder of the Protestant forces first to Auneau (where they rendezvoused with the surviving infantry) and then to the safety of the rebel headquarters at Orléans where the surviving infantry from the battle were to serve as a garrison. Before arriving at Orléans he oversaw the capture of a couple of towns on the Cher river. He was able to maintain good order among the forces he took from the field, though he lacked much in the way of surviving infantry and thus was compelled to look to recruit more. The royal army was too battered by the battle to attempt a pursuit of his force.

The soldier who had captured the Constable was compensated with 6,000 écus for his feat. In Orléans, Montmorency was lodged with the princesse de Condé Éléonore de Roye who tended to his needs attentively.

The captive Condé was treated with great courtesy by the victorious Guise. He shared Guise's dinner table and even Guise's bed. This gentlemanly conduct was both an artefact of noble ethics and designed with the hope of detaching his enemy from the cause of Protestantism. Guise also hoped both to bolster his reputation for gentlemanly conduct and overwhelm the prince with his generosity. After the departure of Guise, Condé fell under the guard of Damville, who maintained him at the abbey of Saint-Pierre near Chartres. In January, he was moved to Paris. Condé wrote to a Norman pastor from his captivity that he believed himself to have been chosen by God to represent the Protestant cause.

Having taken a meal with the captive English ambassador, several chevaliers de l'Ordre de Saint-Michel (knights of the Order of Saint-Michel), and the lieutenant-general and governor of Brittany, Guise retired with the latter to discuss "important matters". The next day, the English ambassador was summoned to convey a message devised by the two grandees. Étampes was able to take advantage of the absence of the other Triumvirs, and the strength of Breton soldiers in the royal army to insert himself into the centre of royal decision making.

In January, the court issued an official protest against the entry into the kingdom of Protestant mercenaries from the Holy Roman Empire in favour of the domestic rebels. Among the signatories were the duc d'Orléans, the young king of Navarre and the cardinal de Bourbon. The king also declared again that neither he nor his mother were captives; thus, Protestant declarations to this effect were lies.

=== Finishing touches ===
On 18 January the secrétaire d'État Jacques Bourdin was tasked by Guise with undertaking a military mission. He was to see that the German soldiers who had been with the Protestants under the commanders Grombach and Rocandolf capitulated.

The duc de Guise was chosen to replace the recently deceased duc de Nevers as governor of Champagne. Nevers had died as a result of wounds sustained at the Battle of Dreux. As reported by the Histoire Ecclésiastique, he was killed mistakenly by his subordinate officer des Bordes, with whom he had collaborated at Troyes. He was succeeded in the Nevers line by his brother Jacques who was left with ruinous debts. Upon assumption of the governate of Champagne, Guise resigned that of Dauphiné, which had lost its strategic importance now that there was peace with Savoy. Though Guise hoped that by the rights of his victory he would get to choose the next marshal of France to replace Saint-André, he was informed by the king that the crown had already selected the seigneur de Vielleville to fill his office. Three days after the battle of Dreux, Guise was made lieutenant-general of the kingdom. This was a confirmation by the crown of the unofficial acclamation he had received from his troops. Guise took responsibility for replacing the deceased gendarme company captains, supplementing those companies that had become depleted and creating captains for the new gendarme companies. In total, he authorised the establishment of 17 new companies. He was careful to reward not only his clients in the process. The lieutenant general of Languedoc, Joyeuse; lieutenant-general of Dauphiné, Maugiron; the senior lieutenant-general of Brittany, Martigues; Timoléon de Cossé, son of Marshal Brissac and the future marshals the baron de Biron and eigneur de Gonnor were all rewarded in this effort with either captaincies if they did not possess them or supplements to their companies.

=== Coligny's Normandy campaign ===
For a time Coligny considered uniting with the Protestant forces in Dauphiné, but the prospect of further royalist reinforcements from the Empire led him to dismiss this idea. Therefore, Coligny left Orléans in the hands of his brother d'Andelot and departed north into Normandy. The infantry that he had taken off the field of Dreux remained with d'Andelot, while his force for the march north was largely composed of cavalry. Along with Coligny went La Rochefoucauld and de Bèze, as well as around 2,000 reiters, 500 men-at-arms, 500 mounted arquebusiers and further horses for the supplies. This force made quick progress, covering 50 leagues in 6 days. While initially in control of his force, by the time he made camp at Dives his troops were tearing apart the countryside. Once in Normandy, he began besieging and capturing towns from the royalists. He successfully took Elbeuf, Bayeux, Saint-Lô, Avranches and Vire. He aimed to unify his forces with those under Montgomery and the English.

As he campaigned, he operated in persistent fear that his German mercenaries would abandon him for want of pay. His troops indeed became more mutinous as time passed, with the mercenaries aggressively raiding the countryside. Coligny resolved to go up to the coast to rendezvous with the English. Elizabeth I’s agents on the continent echoed Coligny's pleas for money. On 20 January Elizabeth wrote him a letter in which she announced that she would happily assist in the payment of his army or provision of men during the captivity of Condé, but only to a degree which was tolerable to the English state. In late February, Coligny and his rampaging mercenaries moved into west Normandy, where they continued to devastate villages regardless of their religious affiliation. Coligny received word that he was to receive financial relief from England to the sum of 8,000 crowns. The English ambassador met with him at Caen on 28 February and informed him that in return for receipt of the money, Elizabeth insisted on his compliance with the entirety of the terms of the Treaty of Hampton Court. He was further informed that if he was entirely reliant on England, the English queen desired him to seek a negotiated settlement as it was not in her interest to support him. He was to insist on the provision of Calais to England in such a settlement. Coligny, in turn, informed the English ambassador that if he did not receive the money soon, he was at risk of having his throat cut by his troops. The first payment would arrive while he was beneath the walls of Caen. On 1 March, he put the château de Caen under siege and the marquis d'Elbeuf, who was held up inside, surrendered the fortification the following day. Elbeuf, the governor of Caen and the garrison were allowed to depart with weapons and supplies in return for their surrender. He followed this up with the capture of Bayeux, which was undertaken by the sieur de Colombières; the town was subdued by his four cannons. Bayeux was subject to a sack, with the priests and tax collectors of the town summarily executed. The Protestant Histoire Ecclésiastique denounced the rapacity of the tax collectors as a just reason for their death.

After Bayeux, he oversaw the capture of Saint-Lô, Avranches and Vire; then Mortagne, L'Aigle, Falaise, Argentan and Bernay. La Meilleraye led the conquest of Honfleur while Montgomery took charge of the capture of Saint-Lô, Avranches and Vire. Confronted by a force of peasants near Bernay, Coligny's mercenaries easily bested them.

=== Siege of Orléans ===
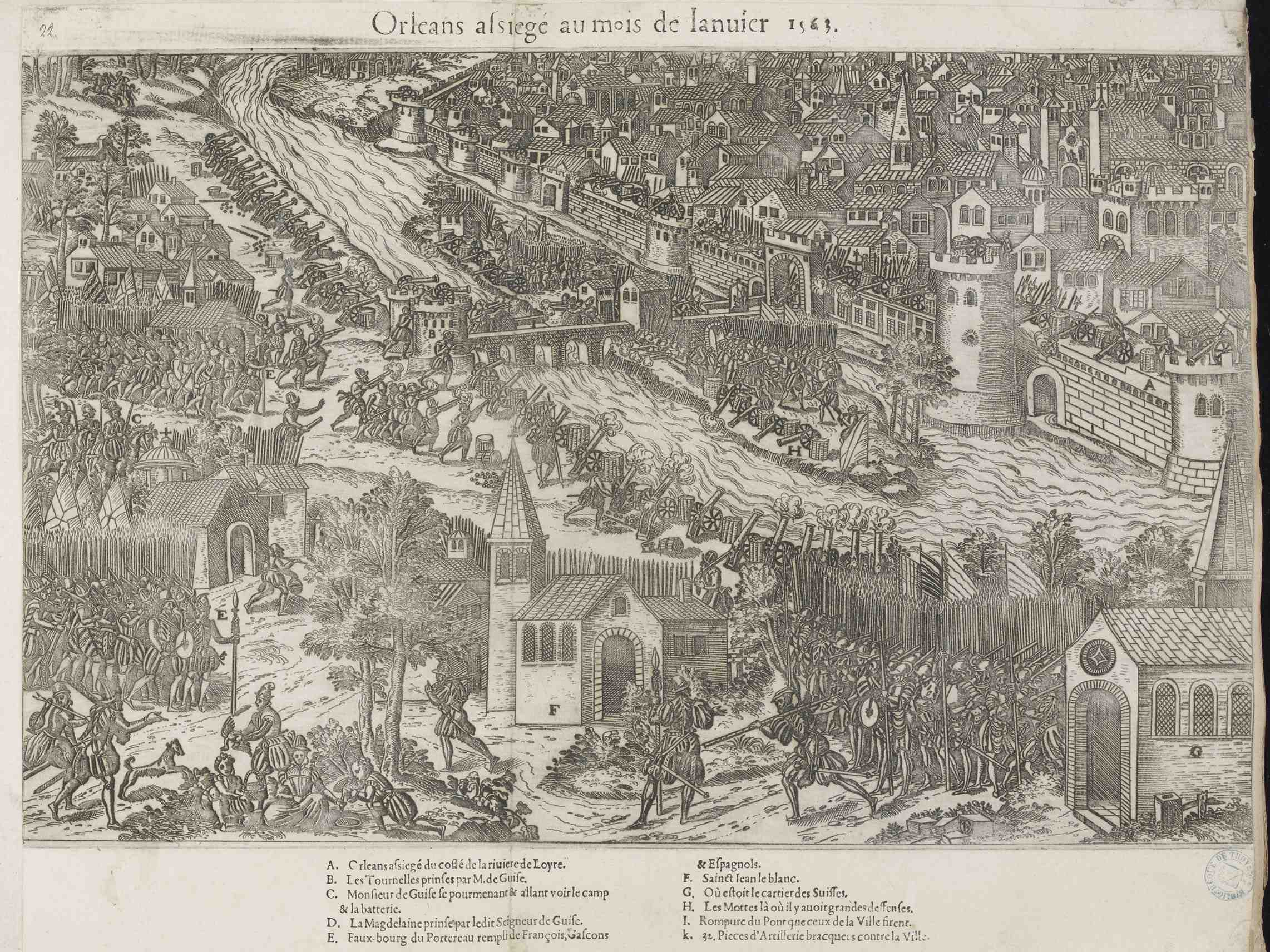
Conduct of the siege of Orléans

Guise returned to the campaign after a brief pause, capturing first Étampes and Pithiviers back from the Protestant rebels. A little while later he had brought all the towns of Beauce back into the royal fold. Then, establishing himself at Beaugency, he made plans for an advance towards Orléans. By this time Orléans was one of two major cities in northern France still in rebel hands alongside Le Havre. Guise saw to the raising of new captains, and the establishment of fresh units of heavy cavalry. By now pay for the royal army was coming into serious arrears and he worked towards the resolution of this.

Guise crossed the Loire and approached Orléans. His crossing coincided with that of Coligny, who was marching the other way and his forces came out the worse in the "collision" at Cléry on 13 January. He resolved to conduct a siege of the city, and arrived in front of the walls on 22 January. Misfortune for the royalist cause struck at this time due to the recent detonation of the powder reserves of Paris, Chartres and Châteaudun. Powder therefore had to be sourced from Spanish Nederland. Further complications came from the weather, which Guise bemoaned the poor quality of in letters to the German mercenary commander. By 5 February he had invested the city and captured the faubourg du Portereau. Guise complained to the seigneur de Gonnor on 7 February that if he only had six cannon and two thousand rounds, he could have the city brought into submission. With the fall of Portereau, Guise turned his attention to two large towers which controlled passage onto the bridge across the river to the main city. A few days later, he was able to capture the two towers. He placed his artillery in these towers so that he might cannonade the city proper.

This accomplished, Guise looked for reinforcements to bolster his position, and while they arrived looked to capture the islands in the Loire between the north and south parts of Orléans. The island of "Les Mottes" was well defended and its capture would prove difficult for Guise without his heavy artillery train.

The seigneur de Duras, who had been defeated in the battle of Vergt, was killed while at Orléans.

De Laubespine was acutely aware that the kingdom's financial situation was increasingly dire, and wrote to Gonnor asking him to make it clear to Guise the weak financial situation of the crown. Catherine by this point was desirous of establishing a negotiated settlement; however, militant Catholic opinion was adverse to this prospect. She further wished to ensure that Guise would not have Orléans sacked. On 5 February, the municipal authorities of Paris implored Catherine to impress upon the Protestants that there could only be one religion in France. The English ambassador reported that the Parisian opposition to peace was one of the three major roadblocks to a successful negotiated settlement. In response to this militancy, Catherine urged Marshal Montmorency to station more troops in the capital.

Due to the poor financial situation, Alluye was unable to secure the sending of the troops under Nemours' command to join with Guise on the siege lines of Orléans, despite the fact that they were much needed. Nemours' soldiers were beginning to starve for lack of funds for food.

=== Assassination of the duc de Guise ===
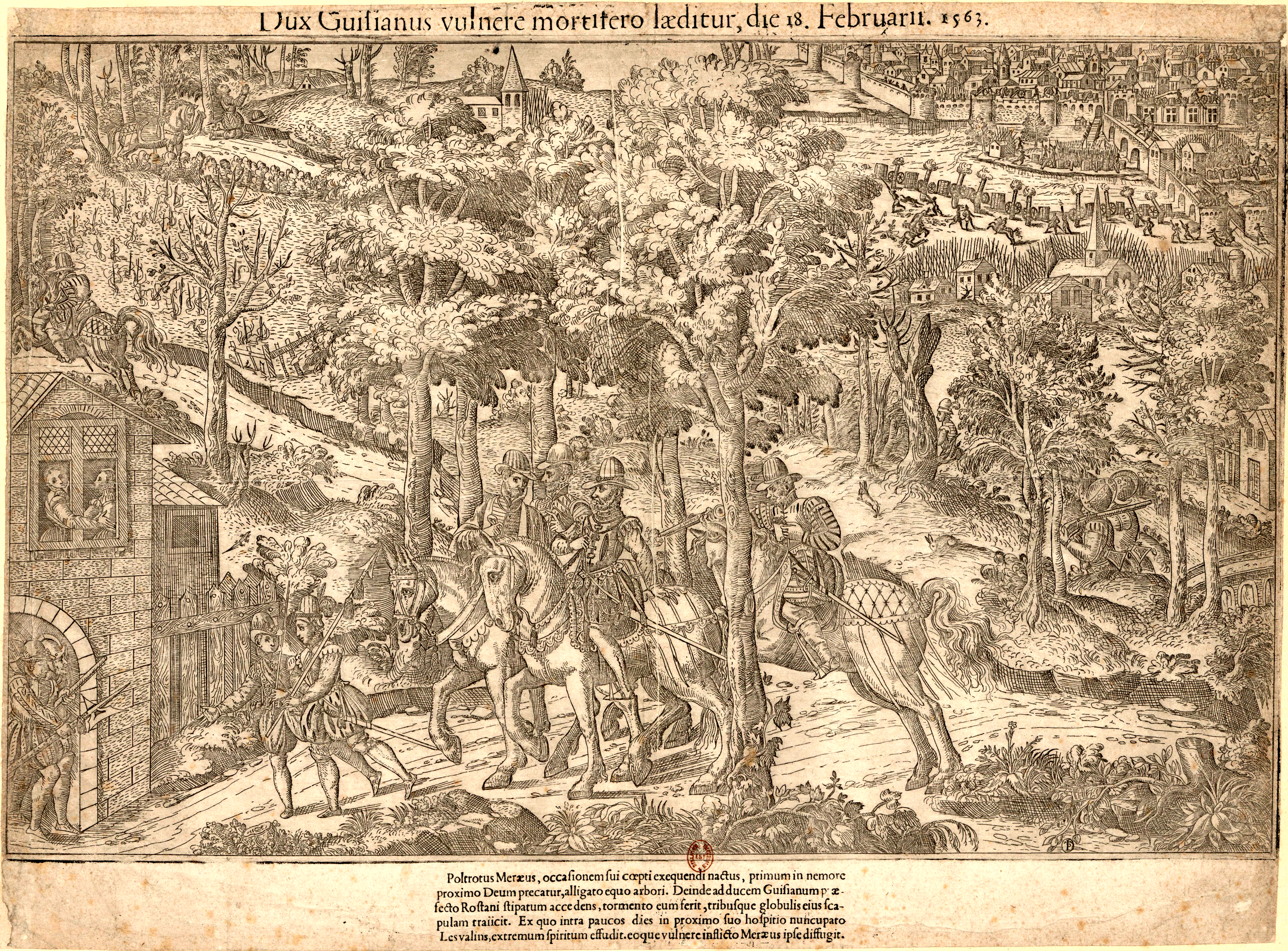
Poltrot de Méré assassinates the duc de Guise on the siege lines of Orléans in 1563

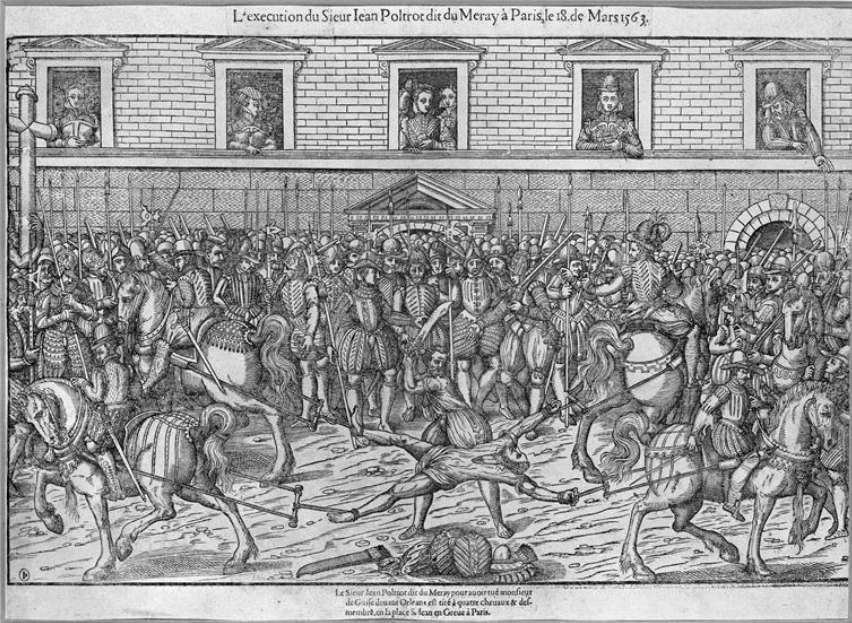
Execution of Poltrot de Méré in Paris

On 18 February, the duc de Guise was returning from an inspection of the siege camp in the suburb of Portereau, where sappers were at work. Many of the thirty artillery pieces he had been waiting for had now arrived, putting him in a far more advantageous position. He was ready to conduct the final assault of the city on the following day. On the return to his camp, he was travelling with Tristan de Rostaing away from the majority of his men, who were further ahead. He was ambushed and fatally wounded by the Protestant Poltrot de Méré. Poltrot had been in the service of the Protestant commander the sieur de Soubise, serving as a messenger between Lyon and the Parc Soubise. Guise was hurried back to his lodgings while Poltrot de Méré attempted to flee. Poltrot de Méré would not succeed and confessed to a soldier who arrested him on suspicion. As he weakened, Guise forgave his killer, and according to his relatives, spent his final days in a chivalric and Christian fashion. He confessed to his chaplain and received extreme unction from the papal legate, the cardinal Ippolito II d'Este. He is supposed to have declared that he would be saved not through his good works but rather by the grace of God and that he considered Condé a friend and good relative who was a victim of the Châtillon family. Further, he apologised for Wassy, though not due to his responsibility, but rather because blood was shed. In his final moments, his more conservative Catholic relatives, the cardinal de Guise and duc d'Aumale, worked to ensure there would be no accusations of Lutheranism as there had been with Navarre's final hours. A conservative catholic confessor Lancelot de Carle, bishop of Riez was chosen, who reported that his final moments were suitably Roman Catholic. Riez was accused of meddling with Guise's words and downplaying Guise's apology for Wassy in his version of the ducs final moments. According to the bishop of Riez, Guise enjoyed listening to the Epistle of Saint James, an Epistle that had been condemned by Luther. The duc de Guise died on 24 February. Command of the siege was taken up by the duc d'Étampes and marshal de Bourdillon. Étampes quickly entered talks with the Protestants of Orléans towards the release of Montmorency.

The captured assassin was subject to interrogations beginning on 21 February when he was brought before Catherine and the royal council at Saint-Hilaire. He confessed that he had been presented by Soubise to Coligny in Orléans and that Coligny had asked him to kill Guise. He informed his interrogators that he refused the request initially, with Coligny swearing him to silence. He then departed to Lyon and it was only on his return in December to Orléans that Coligny, this time with de Bèze, worked on him again and he agreed to the scheme. In return for his participation, he was to receive 20 écus, which was a very small sum, Coligny also informed him he was one of only "50 men" involved in the enterprise, with the other participants to execute "similar deeds" (Poltrot noted that Montpensier and Sansac were particularly despised). Poltrot alleged that after ingratiating himself in Guise's entourage, he returned to the Protestant camp to protest that Guise was always well guarded. Coligny and de Bèze again got him to commit, and forwarded him a further 100 écus to buy a better horse for his escape. He added that La Rochefoucauld may have been involved, but that Condé, Andelot and Soubise were innocent. These confessions were extracted under torture. They also varied from interrogation to interrogation, with the assassin retracting his accusations in a second confession before re-making them in a third.

By contrast, an anonymous account states that Coligny had a would be assassin of the duc de Guise put to death at Rouen.

The Lorraine family (chief among them, the late duc’s widow Anne d'Este, duchesse de Guise) believed in the involvement of Coligny in the killing, and this began a vendetta between the families. This vendetta would culminate ten years later in the assassination of Admiral Coligny. Coligny was not shy about the fact that he viewed the assassination as a positive thing, and wrote to Catherine expressing his satisfaction at the deed, though assuring her that it was not he who had ordered it. In defence of himself, he added that while he of course abhorred the assassination, he was aware of similar conspiracies that targeted himself and Condé, and had presented proof of these to Catherine and Montmorency. After "attempts by Guise and Saint-André to see Condé assassinated", Coligny claimed he had ceased to bother to dissuade those who came to him with assassination plots, while not actively encouraging them. In a document drawn up on 22 March at Caen, Coligny went through the testimony of the assassin point by point, offering a refutation for each section. He stated that if he had wanted to assassinate Guise, he would not have given the job to Poltrot de Méré, that the money he gave him was to spy on the duc and buy a horse and that he interpreted Poltrot's expressed desire to assassinate the duc as bravado. He further included an argument that the language of the testimony was inconsistent with that of a Protestant. Particularly he highlighted that throughout the deposition he was referred to as the "seigneur de Châtillon", a name that was only used "by his enemies". He requested that Poltrot be well guarded and kept like this, such that a proper investigation could be conducted. Those around him in Caen were nervous that the frank nature of his approach to the affair might not play to his advantage politically. Soubise, though not specifically accused, petitioned the king to have him formally declared innocent with no right of appeal or re-opening an investigation into him. De Bèze protested that he had never met Poltrot de Méré and as regarded the duc de Guise he had hoped to see him brought to justice for Wassy and had prayed God to either induce a change of heart in the noble or deliver the kingdom some other way.

Catherine was also relieved to be free of Guise, remarking to Condé in March that just as she had released Condé, so had she been released by the death of the duc. Sutherland notes that according to three of the ambassadors (Spanish, Papal and English) at the French court, Condé inquired in the days prior to the assassination as to whether Guise was injured or dead.

Many Protestants celebrated Poltrot de Méré's deeds, some in verse. According to some, he was an agent of God's will, a David who slew Goliath. The assassination had undoubtedly preserved Orléans from falling to the royal army, and therefore he was lauded as a tyrannicide who had liberated the city just as did Judith when she slew Holofernes.

Paris reacted with horror to the assassination of the duc de Guise. Catherine, conscious that the capital might react explosively, wrote to the Parisian authorities urging them to make sure there was no rioting. The grief at the death of their hero was compounded by the word that Catherine was using the opportunity to negotiate a peace "disadvantageous to the Catholic church". A Catholic crowd seized a woman being taken to prison, killing her and then dragging her body through the city. The guard was increased across the city to stop further attacks and murders.

On 18 March, the day before the peace of Amboise was declared, Poltrot de Méré was executed in Paris before a large crowd. His end was brutal and his limbs were put before each gate of the city, with his body burned to ashes in the place de Grève. This was followed a day later by an elaborate funeral procession for the late duc de Guise. The procession featured many militiamen wielding arquebuses, nobles, clerics and various bourgeois Parisians. Jean de La Fosse estimated there were over 10,000 participants in the funeral. This differentiated it from other princely funerals of the century, which did not enjoy such bourgeois participation.

For Catherine, the death of Guise was a blessing, as she was provided room of her own to manoeuvre politically. The Guise were destroyed as a political force, with the late ducs young son, the prince de Joinville, only 13 years old. Joinville was established as the new governor of Champagne, though during the boy's minority the charge would be exercised by his uncle the duc d'Aumale.

=== Final negotiations ===
Catherine resolved to bring about peace, and to this end Condé and Montmorency were released from their respective captivities so that they might negotiate. Their negotiations began on 6 March and they were accompanied by the royal secrétaire de Laubespine, d'Andelot, the Protestant governor of Orléans, Saint-Cyr and his subordinate Jean d'Aubigné, and Montmorency's second son, the baron de Damville. Montmorency was old, and Condé was keen to return to court. Condé initially moved for the re-establishment of the Edict of Saint-Germain, but this was unacceptable to Montmorency's sensibilities. They therefore quickly reached agreement, which was signed by the parties on 13 March on the Île aux Bœufs.

== Peace ==
=== Edict of Amboise ===
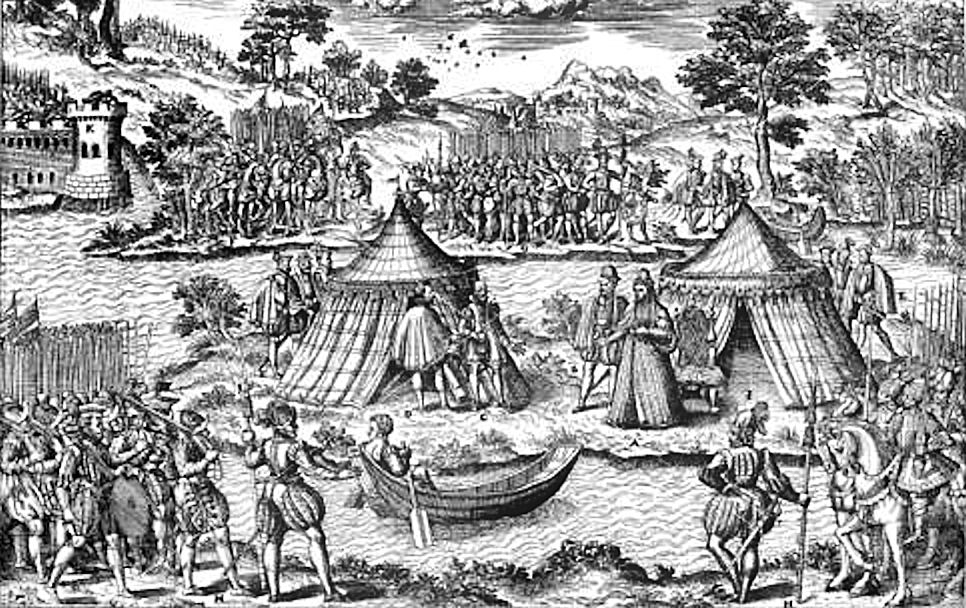
Establishment of the Edict of Amboise after its negotiation on the Île aux Bœufs

On 19 March 1563, the Edict of Amboise brought the war to a close. By its terms all Protestants enjoyed freedom of conscience. Protestant nobles with the rights of high justice to their lands could worship freely on their estates. Those nobles without rights of high justice could worship in their homes. Beyond this, Protestantism was permitted in towns where the religion was controlled before 7 March 1562 and in one town in each baillage (bailiwick). The church must be located in a suburb, though, not in the town proper. Protestantism was prohibited in the vicomté de Paris, though Protestants could live in the area. All property seized from the Catholic church was to be returned. The leading rebels, such as the Châtillon brothers, were restored to the offices they had enjoyed prior to the war. While most crimes such as murder and pillage committed during the war were to be amnestied, exceptions for the killing of children and sexual violence were made. The parlement of Paris baulked at registering the edict, as it had the Edict of January the preceding year. Cardinal de Bourbon and the duc de Montpensier were jointly despatched to compel the parlement to register the edict. On 27 March the parlement agreed to register the edict, though not to publish it. In a calculated rebuke to the parlements' dignity, Catherine therefore chose to declare the young king's majority in the parlement of Rouen. Town criers who announced the peace were pelted with mud.

Sutherland contrasts the edict of Amboise with that of Saint-Germain. The former, she argues, was a permissive edict that allowed Protestant worship without establishing administrative or judicial apparatus for ensuring its application or any military guarantees to the Protestants or any rights to possess offices. By contrast, Amboise afforded an institutional position for Protestantism. Christin adds that the possibility of urban bi-confessionalism was opened for the first time with Amboise, something that had been precluded in the edict of Saint-Germain. Further, the judiciary was not only allowed to be Protestant but its right to be so was advocated for by the king.

The parlement of Dijon likewise refused to register the edict. A delegation was sent to the capital to protest its terms. At the instigation of the lieutenant-general Tavannes, the parlementaire Jean Bégat drew up a critique of the edict. Bégat's criticism was delivered to represent the general Burgundian opposition to the terms. It argued that a state could not take half measures in matters of religion, and that one was either with Christ or against him. Bégat raised the spectre of the possibility of France becoming a "new Germania" where everyone would elect their own ministers. Christin argues that rather than quieting the anti-Protestant policy of the city government, parlement and lieutenant-general, the peace in fact emboldened them as they turned to legal quibbling and judicial attacks. Under great duress, the parlement registered the edict on 19 June 1563, but only with a clause that negated the edict's terms added to the text. It would require the personal presence of the king in May 1564 during the grand tour of the kingdom for the parlement to register the edict in its intended form.

Beneath the parlement of Dijon, the sénéchaussée of Mâcon hesitated before registering the edict, apprehensive that it was not really the king's intention to establish such a peace.

The premier président (first president) of the Bordeaux parlement, Jacques-Benoît Lagebâton, managed to push the registration of the edict through the body over the objections of his colleagues. As a reward for this, the other judges were able to hound him from office some time later. The parlementaires resisted the crown's choice of commissioners for Guyenne for several weeks.

Instead of registering the edict, the parlement of Aix re-established its commitment to the declaration of 1562 that Catholicism was the only religion of the kingdom. The body refused to acknowledge they had received the new peace edict for a year. In response, the royal government dismissed the entire body of justices and replaced them for a year. Ultimately, however, Provence would be excluded from the need to provide sites of worship to the Protestants of the province.

The baron de Caaylus, was entrusted by the court with heading to Toulouse to ensure their parlement registered the edict. He arrived in the city for the registration of the edict on 14 April and then set about working towards its enforcement, receiving the submission of the comte de Crussol and with him the Protestant strongholds that had held out. It would not be until the arrival of the new governor of Languedoc the baron de Damville on 21 July that the edict would be registered. Nevertheless, the parlement refused to either print or display the edict on the grounds it would cause disorder among the Catholic population in reaction to its terms.

The baron de Damville declared in December that as a frontier province, the edict did not apply to Languedoc.

In some Catholic communities, such as Troyes, Protestant prisoners were hurriedly executed before the terms of the treaty could come into force. Many Catholics resented the return of Protestants to the communities they had expelled them from, while Protestants resented the restrictions on their worship.

In Le Mans, the peace did not bring an end to the harassment and brutalisation of the Protestant communities. In Tours it was only after great effort that the Protestant officers of the présidial court were restored to their offices over the objections of the échevins (aldermen) and clerics in December.

In Saintonge, by contrast, the return of Catholicism with peace was only a clandestine one and the syndic of the clergy of Saintes remarked that there were 95 dioceses where there was no practice of the Roman religion and the holders of the benefice dared not reside. In communities such as Montauban, it was only with the arrival of the crown's commissioners in 1564 that Catholic worship was restored.

Similarly in Dieppe, some Protestants argued against the return of Catholics with the peace. They petitioned to receive a Protestant captain, so that their obedience would come more easily. A request was made of Condé on 20 April to provide a governor who was at least sympathetic to Protestantism.

The peace was greatly advantageous to the Protestant nobility at the expense of the broader Protestant community. Condé was rebuked for the terms he had agreed to by both Coligny and the Genevan pastors. Christin argues the Protestant charges that the peace offered less than did Saint-Germain was in part intended as a direct attack on Condé. Jean Calvin himself denounced Condé as a "wretched man" who had betrayed god for his personal vanity. Coligny charged Condé with having damaged the Protestant church to a greater degree than the faith's enemies could have done in ten years. Condé reassured Coligny that once he was lieutenant-general of the kingdom, he would push Catherine for more concessions. The peace established Protestantism as a religion of the high nobility, as it was high nobles who could enjoy the freest practice of the faith; this damaged its ability to attract new converts. A contemporary Protestant pamphlet bemoaned that the remedy of toleration was now restricted to only small parts of the body, while the evil was across the whole. Only complete religious freedom across the kingdom could save France from the problems tearing it apart.

=== Lyon ===
The Protestant governor of Lyon, the baron de Soubise, refused to recognise the edict of Amboise. Writing to Calvin, he expressed his discontent at the terms of the edict, with Calvin responding that he should look to the example of Crussol and Châtillon. He therefore continued resisting until 15 June. During this time (on 11 June), a radical pamphlet was published in the city which argued that private individuals had the right to kill tyrants. This pamphlet was too radical for Soubise and he had all copies of it burned, while the Protestant pastor Pierre Viret denounced it.

On 11 June, Marshal Vielleville had the edict of Amboise registered by the sénéchaussée of Lyon. Mass would be celebrated in Lyon for the first time in fifteen months on 4 July.

=== Crussol's disarmament ===
In the southern provinces under the authority of the Protestant comte de Crussol, the commander attempted to see that his co-religionists adhere to the edict.

Royal letters were sent in March to the lieutenant-generals of Dauphiné and Languedoc (Maugiron and Joyeuse, in the former and latter respectively) ordering them to see that the Protestants disarm before they disarm in turn. Crussol wrote back to the crown protesting that it was impossible to come to accord with Joyeuse due to the hatred that was felt for him in Languedoc. If Crussol handed over towns to the lieutenant-general, he suspected Joyeuse would be unable to hold them. He requested that the crown dispatch a grandee to replace him.

In May, new orders came for Crussol's disarmament from the court, the orders being sent to Maugiron, Joyeuse and the Papal commander Serbelloni alongside him. The crown requested the handing over of the revenues that Crussol had requested and further announced the imminent arrival of Marshal Vielleville to enforce the peace in the Midi. Vielleville was charged with the pacification formally on 8 May.

==== Languedoc ====
In Languedoc, Crussol continued to be involved in military operations, responding to a request from his lieutenant in the Gévaudan for support against the sieges of Catholic lords by dispatching forces from the Vivarais, Gévaudan and Cévennes to the area. Crussol's brother, alongside other commanders, lifted the sieges.

Joyeuse and Crussol continued to wrangle with one another. Joyeuse protested that he had seen the edict adopted in the territories he controlled, while Caylus had been forced to take on that role in the Protestant towns. He further charged Crussol with continuing to reinforce his soldiery and his towns, alongside the continued raising of revenues. The crown was informed that continued Protestant aggression necessitated the maintenance of troops at Aigues-Mortes and Narbonne, which were being menaced. Soon after this, Crussol reached out to Joyeuse proposing a list of towns from which they could both withdraw their forces. He followed this by sending the cardinal de Châtillon to Joyeuse with an offer of simultaneous mutual standing down. By this means the province could be handed over to Vielleville (Nicoll notes that this represented his abhorrence of the notion of providing it to Joyeuse). Joyeuse retorted that his lieutenants were in good obedience to him in applying the peace, but that he could not fully disarm while there were such Protestant forces around Avignon and being maintained by the Montpellier estates, or while Protestants continued to exploit Catholic churches. The Nîmois Protestants oversaw the destruction of the cathedral and several churches in May and the subsequent months. The spat between the two continued over subsequent exchanges, with Crussol emphasising that he would hand over his towns to Vielleville, not Joyeuse.

Another assembly was convened at Montpellier in May at which Crussol attempted to convince the Protestants of the necessity of accepting the peace. Crussol arrived alongside the cardinal de Châtillon and the comte de Caylus, who had been dispatched by the crown to see to the pacification of the Protestants in Languedoc. He was supported in this by the Protestant nobles, who had united with Condé's position. The more modest delegates were less keen on the peace. During the assembly, Caylus announced that he had seen the peace published in Toulouse, Narbonne, Carcassonne and Castelnaudary. Crussol read out a royal letter in favour of the peace. After a discussion, it was agreed to publish the edict on 13 May. Having approved the publication of the peace, the delegates requested that the peace be enforced on the Catholics also, highlighting "many great evils" they had perpetrated since its publication in Toulouse. They further requested the replacement of Lieutenant-General Joyeuse with a prince du sang due to Joyeuse having "introduced the Spanish into the kingdom". The assembly decided to grant Crussol 10 gentlemen to accompany him to court when he made the trip, a sign of their approval of his performance as leader. It was further requested that he continue on in his role until peace was firmly established. The body sought to investigate those who used the coming of peace as a reason to not pay the rents they owed for the Catholic ecclesiastical land they were using. The use of force to compel payments was considered an option.

By June, Crussol reported that the sum of money he was to hand over to the crown was no longer recoverable, as the people of Languedoc did not wish to hand it over given Joyeuse's behaviour. His failure to hand over the gabelle (salt tax) revenue was a result of the crown's agent not appearing to receive it. Catherine wrote to him disapprovingly on this matter, noting that now that the realm was at peace, all the money he had raised via his estates belonged to the crown. She further highlighted that she had been informed military reinforcements continued to be undertaken in Protestant held places and asked Crussol to clarify this. In late June, Crussol wrote back informing her that Protestants were not impeding the collection of harvests or chasing them from territories. By contrast, he noted that in Toulouse a Catholic confession of faith was required. If Vielleville could not arrive in Languedoc, Crussol suggested he would favour handing over the towns to Caylus over Joyeuse. According to the financial records, Crussol was speaking truthfully about his disbanding of troops in May and June.

On 6 July Crussol surrendered control of his towns in Languedoc to Vielleville and Caylus at Valence.

==== Comtat Venaissin ====
In response to a plea for reinforcements from Orange, Crussol saw to the levying of more companies in Provence. Orange further requested the ability to raise revenues through the selling of Catholic assets and benefices. After a discussion with his lieutenant in the Comtat Venaissin, the seigneur de Saint-Auban, Crussol assented to the consuls of Orange taking this step.

Meanwhile, Condé asked Crussol to return the Papal territories to their former master. Crussol wrote back a protest to the prince, informing him that he could not provide them back to the Papacy. Crussol highlighted the expenses incurred in the territory that required reimbursement, that the Pope was no friend of Crussol or Condé, that freedom of Protestant worship would not be guaranteed, and the requests he was receiving from the people of the Comtat Venaissin. Subsequently, Crussol entered negotiations with Serbelloni, offering the return of the territories if freedom of religion and the compensation of his expenses were provided. In reply, the destruction of Avignon was compared favourably to the allowance of Protestantism in the territory.

In early May, the Protestant forces in the Comtat Venaissin captured further settlements in the region. They also continued the levying of soldiers. The estates of Avignon protested to Crussol and the comte de Sault against this and levied troops in response. Calls were sent out to Serbelloni and Sommerive to this effect. Sommerive thus protested to the crown that while he would like to disband, Avignon had great need of soldiers. On 31 May Crussol declared that the king's will that the fighting in the Comtat Venaissin cease was known to him, but that the Provençal troops in the province were not under his authority. Nevertheless, he ordered all these troops to stand down and depart from the Comtat Venaissin.

In June, Crussol asserted that he no longer had any role to play in the Comtat Venaissin and could not be held responsible for Protestant disobedience in the region. He reminded the crown of the indignities he had suffered in the province, including the death of his brother. According to Crussol, injustices continued under the regime of Serbelloni, with the French at the mercy of the Papal commanders and their soldiers. The subordinate he had placed in authority over the region stated on 8 June that he would undertake no further operations but would maintain his presence in the region at the request of 53 walled Protestant communities that did not wish to be preyed on by Serbelloni. Several days later, the Provençal soldiers sent a request to Crussol in which they protested that they entered the Comtat Venaissin in force only because they had been blocked from returning to their homes from the Lyonnais by 2,000 armed men, and they desired to continue their journey home. As both Crussol and Avignon refused them, they therefore had no choice but to remain in the Papal territory.

Finally, at the end of August, the Provençal troops were able to return to Provence.

==== Dauphiné ====
Crussol wrote to the towns of Dauphiné in April to make known the peace and inform them that an agent of the crown would be there soon to translate the royal will.

Crussol protested frustratedly that in Dauphiné, while he was seeing to the disarmament of his forces, Maugiron was still conducting pillage with companies such as that under the comte de Suze which was operating around Romans. According to Crussol, those royal companies under Maugiron who were disbanded had subsequently reconvened and returned to hostilities. Towards the end of May, while still concerned at some of Maugiron's actions, Crussol expressed his satisfaction that Suze's company had disbanded. He ordered the disbanding of a company from Romans for his part.

By June, Crussol reported to the crown that he was heading to Dauphiné to confer with Maugiron, informing Catherine that matters were mostly settled in the province. Vielleville arrived in Dauphiné at the start of July, his arrival much anticipated by the Protestants. They requested of the crown that Maugiron be replaced by their former lieutenant general comte de Clermont.

As late as August there were still troubles in Dauphiné.

=== Provence ===
Violence continued in Provence under the direction of the comte de Villars and comte de Carcès to such an extent that in late 1563 Marshal Biron was dispatched to the province to deal with the situation. He brought with him 500 soldiers and two commissioners to provide backup. Biron led the reduction of the town of Sisteron, which was still holding out for the Protestants. This accomplished he restored the comte de Tende as governor of Provence in Marseille and got the nobility of the province to recognise him. After some time in the area, he recommended in 1564 that Sommerive and Carcès be summoned to court to explain themselves.

=== Guyenne ===
In Guyenne, Monluc maintained his correspondence with the Spanish, and bemoaned the recent peace for allowing Protestants to return to the royal court. He would even suggest to the Spanish king that he establish himself with the crown of France in the name of his wife Élisabeth.

=== Removal of the reiters ===
The German mercenaries who had been brought into the kingdom for the fighting of the war proved to be difficult to remove. The secrétaire Bourdin wrote to Gonnor deploring the scourge which their presence caused the kingdom. It was to be the prince de Porcien who escorted the reiters from the kingdom. To some Catholics, the choice of Porcien was met with disbelief due to his role in the very depredations that had afflicted their provinces in the previous year. The disparate mercenaries, which had been agglomerated into a single army, totalled between 10 and 12 thousand men. They departed from Orléans and entered Brie near Nangis around Easter. On their way to leave the kingdom, the reiters would pass by Châlons, and therefore the governor Bussy attempted again to enforce an expanded garrison upon the town. The council, as before, demurred, causing Bussy to rage and then depart. He complained to the queen and the duc d'Aumale, who was acting as governor of the province during the minority of the duc de Guise. Aumale wrote a harsh letter to the council in which he excoriated them for their failures to show obedience to Bussy. It would not, however, be until Aumale himself imposed a garrison on the town that the issue was resolved in May. With Châlons passed, the force set up camp near Montier-en-Der where they would stay for a month and a half, terrorising the countryside in the hope of receiving payment. Bar-sur-Aube was sacked, the château of Blaye destroyed, and the monastery of Bracancourt torched, alongside general depredations of the countryside. The monks of Bracancourt fled to Chaumont. It was only with the large scale selling of church property in France (with Champagne alone selling off 500,000 livres worth) that they were paid off and departed.

=== Recapture of Le Havre ===
Alluye was despatched to treat with Elizabeth concerning Le Havre. Elizabeth informed him that she had not seized the city for any religious reason, but rather to avenge the wrong of the failure of the French to provide her Calais as stipulated by Cateau-Cambrésis. The French retorted that by seizing Le Havre and Dieppe, the English had voided any claim they had to the return of Calais. This in turn was rejoindered with a reminder of the French involvement in Scotland.

On 7 April Condé was established as lieutenant-general, and a few days later Marshal Brissac moved north into Normandy with the siege guns that had been used for Orléans and a company of Swiss troops. The crown began raising revenues from Paris and the towns of France for the prosecution of the campaign against England. In Le Havre, Warwick's prepared for a siege, expelling all "strangers" and constructing a trench in front of the town. The French began the siege on 22 May, with Catherine attending the operations personally even in the siege trenches.

The siege was a difficult one for the besiegers due to the marsh that was present around the fortification of Havre-de-Grace. Despite this, by the end of July they had advanced almost to the foot of the walls, able to attack them point-blank. The situation was not much better inside the city, which was racked by plague. The garrison was thus greatly reduced. During the siege, the seigneur de Lévis (a brother of the comte de Crussol) was killed.

On 28 July 1563, Condé and Montmorency's army of Protestant and Catholic troops received the surrender of Warwick. He departed a few days later and the French army entered Le Havre on 1 August. By this means it was hoped to heal the wound to national pride, and to bring Catholics and Protestants together for a national project. Coligny and d'Andelot disapproved of the undertaking and refused to participate in the recapture of Le Havre. Peace was finally established with England by the treaty of Troyes in April 1564. By its terms, Elizabeth ceded her claim to Calais, in return for 120,000 écus in compensation.

=== Modifications of the peace ===
The edict of Amboise would not remain in the same form over the coming years. The declaration of Roussillon would reduce the favourability of the terms towards the Protestants.

== Bibliography ==
- Babelon, Jean-Pierre (2009). Henri IV. Fayard.
- Baumgartner, Frederic (1986). Change and Continuity in the French Episcopate: The Bishops and the Wars of Religion 1547–1610.
- Benedict, Philip (1999). "The Dynamics of Protestant Militancy: France 1555–1563". In Benedict, Philip; Marnef, Guido; Nierop, Henk van; Venard, Marc (eds.). Reformation, Revolt and Civil War in France and the Netherlands 1555-1585. Royal Netherlands Academy of Arts and Sciences.
- Benedict, Philip (2003). Rouen during the Wars of Religion. Cambridge University Press.
- Benedict, Philip (2012). "Prophets in Arms? Ministers in War, Ministers on War: France 1562-1574". In Murdock, Graeme; Roberts, Penny; Spicer, Andrew (eds.). Ritual and Violence: Natalie Zemon Davis and Early Modern France. Oxford University Press.
- Benedict, Philip (2020). Season of Conspiracy: Calvin, the French Reformed Churches, and Protestant Plotting in the Reign of Francis II (1559–1560). American Philosophical Society.
- Bernstein, Hilary (2004). Between Crown and Community: Politics and Civic Culture in Sixteenth-Century Poitiers. Cornell University Press.
- Bourquin, Laurent (1994). Noblesse Seconde et Pouvoir en Champagne aux XVIe et XVIIe Siècles. Paris 1 Panthéon-Sorbonne University.
- Carroll, Stuart (2003). "The Compromise of Charles, Cardinal de Lorraine: New Evidence". The Journal of Ecclesiastical History. 54–3.
- Carroll, Stuart (2005). Noble Power during the French Wars of Religion: The Guise Affinity and Catholic Cause in Normandy. Cambridge University Press.
- Carroll, Stuart (2006). Blood and Violence in Early Modern France. Oxford University Press.
- Carroll, Stuart (2011). Martyrs and Murderers: The Guise Family and the Making of Europe. Oxford University Press.
- Carroll, Stuart (2012). "The Rights of Violence". In Murdock, Graeme; Roberts, Penny; Spicer, Andrew (eds.). Ritual and Violence: Natalie Zemon Davis and Early Modern France. Oxford University Press.
- Carroll, Stuart (2013). "Nager entre deux eaux: The Princes and the Ambiguities of French Protestantism". Sixteenth Century Journal. 44–4.
- Carpi, Olivia (2012). Les Guerres de Religion (1559–1598): un Conflit Franco-Français. Ellipses.
- Carpi, Olivia (2005). Une République Imaginaire: Amiens pendant les Troubles de Religion (1559–1597). Belin.
- Chevallier, Pierre (1985). Henri III: Roi Shakespearien. Fayard.
- Christin, Olivier (1997). La Paix de Religion: L'Autonomisation de la Raison Politique au XVIe Siècle. Éditions du Seuil.
- Christin, Olivier (1999). "From Repression to Pacification: French Royal Policy in the Face of Protestantism". In Benedict, Philip; Marnef, Guido; Nierop, Henk van; Venard, Marc (eds.). Reformation, Revolt and Civil War in France and the Netherlands 1555–1585. Royal Netherlands Academy of Arts and Sciences.
- Cloulas, Ivan (1979). Catherine de Médicis. Fayard.
- Constant, Jean-Marie (1984). Les Guise. Hachette Book Group.
- Constant, Jean-Marie (1996). La Ligue. Fayard.
- Constant, Jean-Marie (1999). "The Protestant Nobility in France during the Wars of Religion: A Leaven of Innovation in a Traditional World". In Benedict, Philip; Marnef, Guido; Nierop, Henk van; Venard, Marc (eds.). Reformation, Revolt and Civil War in France and the Netherlands 1555-1585. Royal Netherlands Academy of Arts and Sciences.
- Crété, Liliane (1985). Coligny. Fayard.
- Crouzet, Denis (1998). La Sagesse et le Malheur: Michel de L'Hospital, Chancelier de France. Champ Vallon.
- Crouzet, Denis (1999). "Calvinism and the Users of the Political and the Religious (France, ca. 1560 – ca. 1572)". In Benedict, Philip; Marnef, Guido; Nierop, Henk van; Venard, Marc (eds.). Reformation, Revolt and Civil War in France and the Netherlands 1555-1585. Royal Netherlands Academy of Arts and Sciences.
- Dauvin, Antoine (2021). Un Mythe de Concorde Urbaine?: le Corps de Ville de Caen, le Gouverneur et le Roi durant les Guerres de Religion (1557-1594). Normandie Université.
- Davies, Joan (1979). "Persecution and Protestantism: Toulouse 1562–1575". The Historical Journal. 22–1.
- Diefendorf, Barbara (1991). Beneath the Cross: Catholics and Huguenots in Sixteenth Century Paris. Oxford University Press.
- Durot, Éric (2012). François de Lorraine, duc de Guise entre Dieu et le Roi. Classiques Garnier.
- Foa, Jérémie (2004). "Making Peace: The Commissioners for Enforcing the Pacification Edicts in the Reign of Charles IX (1560-1574)". French History. 18–3.
- Garrisson-Estèbe, Janine (1980). Protestants du Midi 1559-1598. Privat.
- Garrisson, Janine (1991). Guerre Civile et Compromis 1559-1598. Éditions du Seuil.
- Gould, Kevin (2016). Catholic Activism in South-West France 1540–1570. Routledge.
- Greengrass, Mark (1983). "The Anatomy of a Religious Riot in Toulouse in May 1562". The Journal of Ecclesiastical History. 34–3.
- Greengrass, Mark (1999). "Financing the Cause: Protestant Mobilization and Accountability in France (1562–1598)". In Benedict, Philip; Marnef, Guido; Nierop, Henk van; Venard, Marc (eds.). Reformation, Revolt and Civil War in France and the Netherlands 1555-1585. Royal Netherlands Academy of Arts and Sciences.
- Harding, Robert (1978). Anatomy of a Power Elite: the Provincial Governors in Early Modern France. Yale University Press.
- Heller, Henry (1991). Iron and Blood: Civil War in Sixteenth-Century France. McGill–Queen's University Press.
- Holt, Mack P. (2005). The French Wars of Religion, 1562-1629. Cambridge University Press.
- Holt, Mack (2012). "Religious Violence in Sixteenth-Century France: Moving Beyond Pollution and Purifucation". In Murdock, Graeme; Roberts, Penny; Spicer, Andrew (eds.). Ritual and Violence: Natalie Zemon Davis and Early Modern France. Oxford University Press.
- Holt, Mack (2020). The Politics of Wine in Early Modern France: Religion and Popular Culture in Burgundy 1477–1630. Cambridge University Press.
- Jouanna, Arlette (1989). Le Devoir de révolte: La noblesse française et la gestation de l'État moderne 1559–1661. Fayard.
- Jouanna, Arlette (1998). "Le Temps des Guerres de Religion en France (1559–1598)". In Jouanna, Arlette; Boucher, Jacqueline; Biloghi, Dominique; Le Thiec, Guy (eds.). Histoire et Dictionnaire des Guerres de Religion.
- Jouanna, Arlette (2021). La France du XVIe Siècle 1483–1598. Presses Universitaires de France.
- Kingdon, Robert M. (2007). Geneva and the Coming of the Wars of Religion in France 1555–1563. Librairie Droz.
- Knecht, Robert (1996). The Rise and Fall of Renaissance France. Fontana Press.
- Knecht, Robert (2008). The French Renaissance Court. Yale University Press.
- Knecht, Robert (2010). The French Wars of Religion, 1559–1598. Routledge.
- Knecht, Robert (2014). Catherine de' Medici. Routledge.
- Knecht, Robert (2016). Hero or Tyrant? Henry III, King of France, 1574–1589. Routledge.
- Konnert, Mark (1997). Civic Agendas & Religious Passion: Châlon-sur-Marne during the French Wars of Religion 1560–1594. Sixteenth Century Journal.
- Konnert, Mark (2006). Local Politics in the French Wars of Religion: The Towns of Champagne, the Duc de Guise and the Catholic League 1560–1595. Ashgate Publishing.
- Mariéjol, Jean H. (1983). La Réforme, la Ligue, l'Édit de Nantes. Tallandier.
- Miquel, Pierre (1980). Les Guerres de Religion. Fayard.
- Nicoll, David (2020). Noble Identity during the French Wars of Religion: Antoine de Crussol, the duc d'Uzès. University of Warwick.
- Nicholls, David (1994). "Protestants, Catholics and Magistrates in Tours 1562–1572: The Making of a Catholic City during the Religious Wars". French History. 8–1.
- Pernot, Michel (1987). Les Guerres de Religion en France 1559–1598. SEDES.
- Pitts, Vincent (2012). Henri IV of France: His Reign and Age. Johns Hopkins University Press.
- Potter, David (1993). War and Government in the French Provinces: Picardy 1470–1560. Cambridge University Press.
- Potter, David (1997). The French Wars of Religion: Selected Documents. Palgrave Macmillan.
- Potter, David (2001). "The French Protestant Nobility in 1562: The @Associacion de Monseigneur le Prince de Condé"". French History. 15–3.
- Rivault, Antoine (2023). Le Duc d'Étampes et la Bretagne: Le Métier de gouverneur de Province à la Renaissance (1543–1565). Presses Universitaires de Rennes.
- Robbins, Kevin (1997). City on the Ocean Sea: La Rochelle, 1530–1650, Urban Society, Religion and Politics on the French Atlantic Frontier. Brill Publishers.
- Roberts, Penny (1996). A City in Conflict: Troyes during the French Wars of Religion. Manchester University Press.
- Roberts, Penny (2012). "Peace, Ritual and Sexual Violence during the Religious Wars". In Murdock, Graeme; Roberts, Penny; Spicer, Andrew (eds.). Ritual and Violence: Natalie Zemon Davis and Early Modern France. Oxford University Press.
- Roberts, Penny (2013). Peace and Authority during the French Religious Wars c. 1560–1600. Palgrave Macmillan.
- Roelker, Nancy (1968). Queen of Navarre: Jeanne d'Albret 1528–1572. Harvard University Press.
- Roelker, Nancy (1996). One King, One Faith: The Parlement of Paris and the Religious Reformation of the Sixteenth Century. University of California Press.
- Romier, Lucien (1923). La Conjuration d'Amboise: L'Aurore Sanglante de la Liberté de Conscience, Le Règne et la mort de François II. Perrin et Cie.
- Romier, Lucien (1924). Catholiques et Huguenots à la cour de Charles IX. Perrin et Cie.
- Le Roux, Nicolas (2022). 1559–1629 – Les Guerres de Religion. Éditions Gallimard.
- Salmon, J.H.M. (1979). Society in Crisis: France in the Sixteenth Century. Metheun & Co.
- Solnon, Jean-François (2001). Henri III: un désir de majesté. Librarie Académique Perrin.
- Souriac, Pierre-Jean (2008). Une Guerre Civile: Affrontements Religieux et Militaires dans Le Midi Toulousain (1562–1596). Champ Vallon.
- Sutherland, Nicola (1962). The French Secretaries of State in the Age of Catherine de Medici. Continuum International Publishing Group.
- Sutherland, Nicola (1980). The Huguenot Struggle for Recognition. Yale University Press.
- Sutherland, Nicola (1981). "The Assassination of François Duc de Guise, February 1563". The Historical Journal. 24–2.
- Tingle, Elizabeth C. (2006). Authority and Society in Nantes during the French Wars of Religion, 1559–1598. Manchester University Press.
- Thompson, James (1909). The Wars of Religion in France 1559–1576: The Huguenots, Catherine de Medici and Philip II. University of Chicago Press.
- Tulchin, Allan (2010). That Men Would Praise the Lord: The Triumph of Protestantism in Nîmes 1530–1570. Oxford University Press.
- Turchetti, Mario (1999). "Middle Partis in France during the Wars of Religion". In Benedict, Philip; Marnef, Guido; Nierop, Henk van; Venard, Marc (eds.). Reformation, Revolt and Civil War in France and the Netherlands 1555-1585. Royal Netherlands Academy of Arts and Sciences.
- Tulchin, Allan (2012). "Massacres during the French Wars of Religion". In Murdock, Graeme; Roberts, Penny; Spicer, Andrew (eds.). Ritual and Violence: Natalie Zemon Davis and Early Modern France. Oxford University Press.
- Venard, Marc (1999). "Catholicism and Resistance to the Reformation in France, 1555–1585". In Benedict, Philip; Marnef, Guido; Nierop, Henk van; Venard, Marc (eds.). Reformation, Revolt and Civil War in France and the Netherlands 1555–1585. Royal Netherlands Academy of Arts and Sciences.
- Vray, Nicole (1997). La Guerre des Religions dans la France de l'Ouest: Poitou-Aunis-Saintonge 1534–1610. Geste Éditions.
- Wood, James (2002). The King's Army: Warfare, Soldiers and Society during the Wars of Religion in France, 1562–1576. Cambridge University Press.
