= Duke of Piney-Luxembourg =

Ducal title in France

Duke of Piney (French: Duc de Piney) was a title in the Peerage of France named for the holding of Piney. The holders were also sometimes called duc de Luxembourg, after the House of Luxembourg, from whom they were descended.

== History ==
The duchy-peerage was created in 1581 for François de Luxembourg, third son of Antoine de Luxembourg, Count of Ligny and Brienne. He died in 1613 and was succeeded by his son:

Henri de Luxembourg (1583–1616), second duke, was father of Marguerite-Charlotte de Luxembourg (1607–1680), heiress to the title. She married firstly, Léon d'Albert de Luynes (1582–1630), who became third duc de Piney jure uxoris; he was the younger brother of Charles d'Albert, duc de Luynes. Their son, Henri-Léon d'Albert de Luxembourg (1630–1697), fourth duke, resigned the peerage in 1661 and joigned a religious order, becoming known as the "Abbé de Luxembourg". His mother simultaneously resigned it to her daughter by her second marriage (the fourth duke's half-sister), Madeleine-Charlotte de Clermont de Luxembourg (1635–1701). She was the daughter of Charles-Henri de Clermont-Tonnerre (died 1674).

Madeleine-Charlotte was married in 1661 to François-Henri de Montmorency (1628–1695), comte de Bouteville and sovereign Count of Luxe; he became fifth duc de Piney jure uxoris and later a Marshal of France. He sued the other peers of France to obtain the precedence of the original Piney peerage created in 1581, by which he would have outranked most of France's dukes.

Their son Charles-François de Montmorency-Luxembourg (1662–1726), sixth duc de Piney-Luxembourg, had previously been created duc de Beaufort, later de Montmorency. He pursued his father's lawsuit claiming precedence based on the princely origin of his ancestors as well as the seniority of his title. But a 1711 edict assigned the Piney dukedom precedence only as of 1661.

He was father of Charles-François-Frédéric de Montmorency-Luxembourg (1702–1764), seventh duc de Piney and second duc de Montmorency, who also became a Marshal of France. At his death the dukedom of Montmorency passed to the family of his granddaughter, while the lands of Piney were purchased by Anne-Charles-Sigismond de Montmorency-Luxembourg (1737–1803), marquis de Royan, who therefore became duc de Piney. He was the son of Charles-Anne-Sigismond, duc d'Olonne (1721–1777) and grandson of the last duke's first cousin and heir-male Charles-Paul-Sigismond, duc de Bouteville (1697–1785); both these men had declined the peerage. His son Charles-Emmanuel-Sigismond de Montmorency-Luxembourg (1774–1861) was the last holder of the title, though the last male member of the Montmorency-Luxembourg family was Anne-Edouard-Louis-Joseph (1802–1878), duc de Beaumont.

== Descent ==
House of Limburg–Arlon/the House of Ligny-Luxemburg, Dukes of Piney-Luxembourg in France

Anthony I (1450–1519); Count of Ligny and Brienne (see House of Luxembourg)
Charles I (1488–1530); Count of Ligny and Brienne
Anthony II ( –1557); Count of Ligny and Brienne	Louis III ( -1571)
John III ( -1576); Count of Ligny and Brienne	François (1542-1613) cr. 1581 Duke of Piney commonly called "Duke of Piney-Luxembourg"	Anthony ( -1573)	Henry
Antony	Charles II (1562-1608); Count of Ligny and Brienne elevated to Duke of Brienne in 1587	Francis (1563-1576); Count of Ligny and Brienne elevated to Duke of Brienne in 1587	Henri de Luxembourg (1583–1616); 2nd Duke of Piney-Luxembourg
Henry III (1583 – 1616} Count of Ligny and Brienne elevated to Duke of Brienne in 1587	Marguerite-Charlotte de Luxembourg (1607–1680) heiress to the title 1m.Léon d'Albert de Luynes (1582–1630); 3rd duc de Piney jure uxoris 2m. Charles-Henri de Clermont-Tonnerre ( -1674)
Henri-Léon d'Albert de Luxembourg (1630–1697) 4th Duke of Piney-Luxembourg resigned the peerage in 1661	Madeleine-Charlotte de Clermont de Luxembourg (1635–1701)	François-Henri de Montmorency-Bouteville (1628–1695) comte de Bouteville and sovereign Count of Luxe; 5th Duke of Piney-Luxembourg jure uxoris cr.Duke of Piney-Luxembourg; Marshal of France called Maréchal de Luxembourg
House of Montmorency-Luxembourg and here

== Portraiture ==
Portraits of several of the dukes are held in a number of public collections.

- The British Museum holds multiple portraits of François Henri de Montmorency-Bouteville, duc de Luxembourg (1628–1695)
- The British museum also holds a satirical cartoon by Isaac Cruikshank published in July 1790, of Anne Charles Sigismond de Montmorency-Luxembourg (1737–1803), and other aristocrats, fleeing from France, Salus in Fugâ la France se purge petit à petit.
- A portrait of Charles-Emmanuel-Sigismond de Montmorency-Luxembourg (1774–1861) by Francois Le Villain is held in the National Portrait Gallery, London
