= John, Count of Ligny =

John, Count of Ligny may refer to:

- John I of Ligny
- John II of Ligny
- John III, Count of Ligny
