= Counts of Ligny =

The Lords of Ligny, later Counts of Ligny, ruled the fief of Ligny-en-Barrois during the Middle Ages. In 1240, the seigniory of Ligny-en-Barrois was given by Henry II of Bar as the dowry of his daughter Marguerite, who married Henry V of Luxemburg (Henry I of Ligny). Henry bestowed it upon his younger son Waleran in 1281, who was killed at the Battle of Worringen in 1288. In 1364, it was elevated to a county by Guy I, and remained in the Luxembourg family and their descendants (with an interruption 1476–1510) until 1719, when it was sold to the Duke of Lorraine by Charles-Francis.

== Lords of Ligny ==
Image	Name	Lived	Reigned	Emblem	House	Relationship with predecessor
	Henry I	1216 – 24 December 1281	1240 - 24 December 1281		House of Luxembourg	Founder of Lordship
	Waleran I	Died 5 June 1288	24 December 1281 - 5 June 1288		House of Luxembourg	Son of Henry I
	Henry II	Died 1303	5 June 1288 - 1303		House of Luxembourg	Son of Waleran I
	Waleran II	Died 1354	1303 - 1354		House of Luxembourg	Brother of Henry II, Son of Waleran I
	John I	Died 17 May 1364	1354 - 17 May 1364		House of Luxembourg	Son of Waleran II

== Counts of Ligny ==
Image	Name	Lived	Reigned	Emblem	House	Relationship with predecessor
	Guy	1340 – 23 August 1371	1364 - 23 August 1371		House of Luxembourg	Son of John I
	Waleran III	1355 – 25 October 1415	1371 - 25 October 1415		House of Luxembourg	Son of Guy
	Philip I	July 25, 1404 – 4 August 1430	1415 - 4 August 1430		House of Valois-Burgundy	Grandson of Waleran III
	Joan	Died 18 September 1430	4 August 1430 - 18 September 1430		House of Luxembourg	Great-Aunt of Philip I, Sister of Waleran III
	John II	1392 – 5 January 1441	18 September 1430 - 5 January 1441		House of Luxembourg	Nephew of Joan
	Louis I	1418 – 19 December 1475	5 January 1441 - 19 December 1475		House of Luxembourg	Nephew of John II
	Louis II	Died 1487	1475 - 1487		House of Bourbon	Legitimized bastard of Charles I, Duke of Bourbon
	Charles of Bourbon	Died 1510	1487 - 1510		House of Bourbon	Son of Louis II
	Anthony I	1450 – 1519	1510 - 1519		House of Luxembourg	Son of Louis I
	Charles I	1488 - 1530	1519 - 1530		House of Luxembourg	Son of Anthony I
	Anthony II	Died 8 February 1557	1530 - 8 February 1557		House of Luxembourg	Son of Charles I
	John III	Died 1 July 1576	1557 - 1 July 1576		House of Luxembourg	Son of Anthony II
	Charles II	1562 - 1608	1576 - 1608		House of Luxembourg	Son of John III
	François	Died 1613	1608 - 1613		House of Luxembourg	Brother of Charles II, Son of John III
	Henry III	1583 – 1616	1613 - 1616		House of Luxembourg	Son of François
	Margaret-Charlotte	1607 - 1680	1616 - 1680		House of Luxembourg	second cousin of Henry III
	Madeline-Charlotte	1635 – 1701	1680 - 1701		House of Clermont-Tonnerre, House of Luxembourg	Daughter of Margaret-Charlotte
	Charles-Francis	1662 – 1726	1701 – 1719		House of Montmorency, House of Luxembourg	Son of Madeline-Charlotte

House of Limburg–Arlon/the House of Ligny-Luxemburg, Dukes of Piney-Luxembourg in France

Anthony I (1450–1519); Count of Ligny and Brienne (see above)
Charles I (1488–1530); Count of Ligny and Brienne
Anthony II ( –1557); Count of Ligny and Brienne	Louis III ( -1571)
John III ( -1576); Count of Ligny and Brienne	Francis (1542-1613) cr. 1581 Duke of Piney commonly called "Duke of Piney-Luxembourg"	Anthony ( -1573)	Henry
Antony	Charles II (1562-1608); Count of Ligny and Brienne elevated to Duke of Brienne in 1587	François (1563-1576); Count of Ligny and Brienne elevated to Duke of Brienne in 1587	Henri de Luxembourg (1583–1616); 2nd Duke of Piney-Luxembourg
Henry III (1583 – 1616} Count of Ligny and Brienne elevated to Duke of Brienne in 1587	Marguerite-Charlotte de Luxembourg (1607–1680) heiress to the title 1m.Léon d'Albert de Luynes (1582–1630) third duc de Piney jure uxoris 2m. Charles-Henri de Clermont-Tonnerre ( -1674)
Henri-Léon d'Albert de Luxembourg (1630–1697)4thDuke of Piney-Luxembourg resigned the peerage in 1661	Madeleine-Charlotte de Clermont de Luxembourg (1635–1701)	François-Henri de Montmorency-Bouteville (1628–1695) comte de Bouteville and sovereign Count of Luxe; 5th Duke of Piney-Luxembourg jure uxoris cr.Duke of Piney-Luxembourg; Marshal of France called Maréchal de Luxembourg
House of Montmorency-Luxembourg and here
