= Henry II, Lord of Ligny =

Lord of Ligny (died 1303)

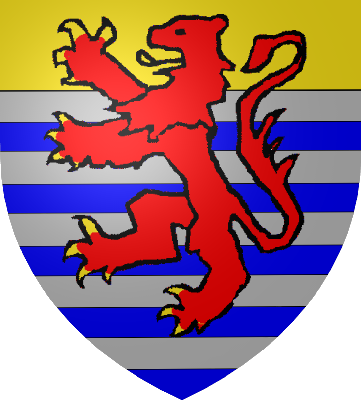
- Coat of Arms of Henry II.

Lord of Ligny and La Roche
- Reign: 1288–1303
- Predecessor: Waleran I
- Successor: Waleran II
- Died: 1303
- House: Luxembourg
- Father: Waleran I of Luxembourg, Lord of Ligny
- Mother: Joan of Beauvoir

Henry II of Luxembourg (died 1303) was Lord of Ligny from 1288 to his death in 1303. He inherited the Lordship of Ligny from his father in 1288 following his death in the Battle of Worringen. Following Henry's death, his brother Waleran II succeeded him.
