= Terreaux Hoard =

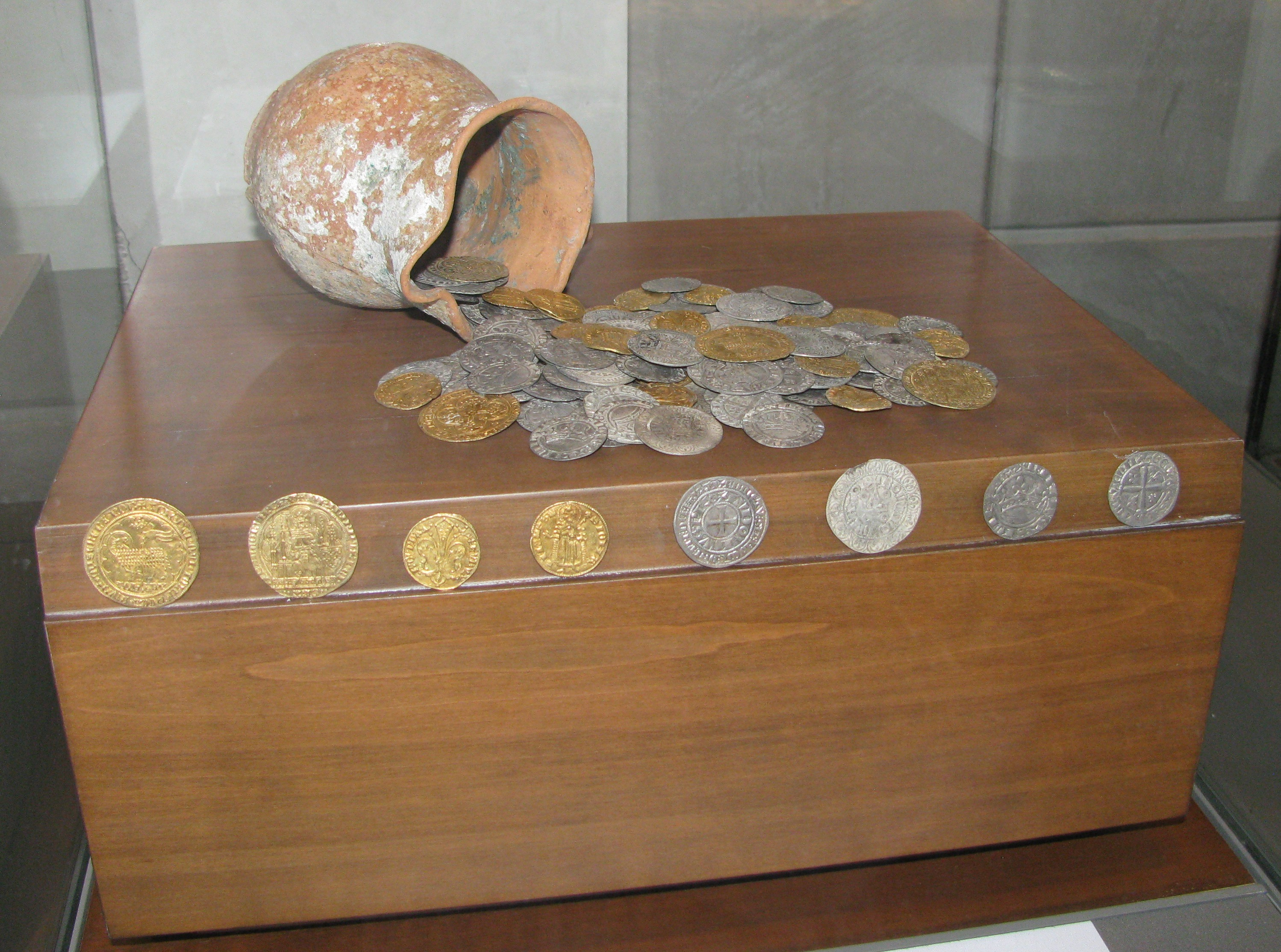
The hoard on display

The Terreaux Hoard (French - Trésor des Terreaux) is a hoard of coins discovered during excavations prior to the construction of an underground car park in place des Terreaux in Lyon in 1993. It was made up of 459 silver coins and 84 gold coins in an earthenware pot. Judging by the coins' date, it was buried c.1360 during the Hundred Years War. The coins include five écus of Philip VI of Valois, two moutons d'or of John the Good, a Venetian ducat and a number of florins. It is on display at the Museum of Fine Arts of Lyon.

== Sources ==
- Michel Dhénin, Marc Bompaire, Chrisitian Cécillon et alii, « Le trésor de Terreaux », Bulletin des musées et monuments lyonnais, 1–2, 1996, p. 50-63, 91–98, 99-109
