= Anthony II =

Anthony II may refer to:

- Anthony II, Count of Ligny (died 1557)
- Anthony II Peter Arida (1863–1955), Maronite Patriarch in 1932–1955
