= Guillaume de Joyeuse =

French military commander

- Seigneur de Joyeuse
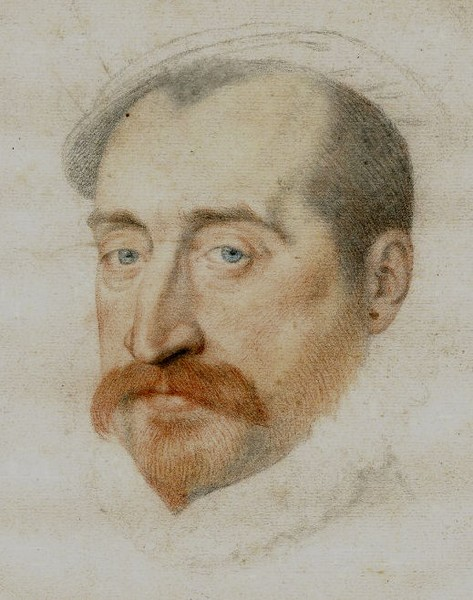
- Possible portrait of Joyeuse, in the British Museum collection
- Other titles: Marshal of France
- Born: 1 January 1520; Châtillon-sur-Loing, Kingdom of France
- Died: 1 January 1592 (aged 72); Kingdom of France
- Family: Joyeuse
- Spouse: Marie de Batarnay
- Issue: Anne de Joyeuse; François de Joyeuse; Henri, Duke of Joyeuse
- Father: Jean Vicomte de Joyeuse
- Mother: Françoise de Voisins, dames d'Arques

Guillaume de Joyeuse (1520–1592) was a French military commander during the French Wars of Religion. Originally destined for the church, he assumed the office of vicomte de Joyeuse upon the death of his elder brother in 1554. He was subsequently appointed at lieutenant-general of Languedoc, under the governor Antoine de Crussol. In this capacity he established himself as a harsh persecutor of Protestantism. When the civil wars broke out in 1562 he assumed his military responsibilities, regularly fighting with the viscomtes de Languedoc throughout the early civil wars. He achieved a notable victory against them in 1568 on the field of Montfran. He did not spread the Massacre of Saint Bartholomew into the territory he controlled and remained loyal to the crown during the fifth civil war, fighting with the Malcontents. In 1582 he was elevated to Marshal of France by Henri III. He found himself increasingly drawn to the Catholic League (France) after its formal formation and when Henri III was assassinated in 1589 he fought against Navarre for Charles, Duke of Mayenne and the league. He died in 1592.

== Early life and family ==
The Joyeuse family had a long history of service to the French crown by the time Guillaume was born. The son of Jean, Vicomte de Joyeuse and Françoise de Voisins, dames d'Arques he was initially intended for a church career as the younger son. When his brother died he assumed leadership of the family and renounced his church career.

He married Marie de Batarnay and with her had several children, among whom Anne de Joyeuse would become one of Les Mignons of Henri III, and a key favourite of the king, being made duke of Joyeuse in 1581.

== Reign of Francis II ==
Joyeuse warned the young king that he was not sure he could rely on the obedience of his subordinates in the region in the towns of Beaucaire and Aigues-Mortes, he further complained that Huguenots were reaching out to indebted nobles, taking advantage of their financial position to secure protection for their services. As early as 1560, Joyeuse intervened in the largely Protestant town of Nîmes to replace its town council. He noted that deserters from the royal garrisons were forming bands that terrorised the countryside, and that 1200 such men were in the Gevaudan .

== Reign of Charles IX ==
=== Crisis of authority ===
With fear of Spanish intentions on the rise in 1561, Joyeuse was instructed by Catherine de'Medici to ensure as lieutenant-general of Languedoc that he was ready if troops crossed the frontier. As royal police became increasingly conciliatory towards the Huguenots, he wrote with exasperation to the crown in 1562 that the lack of clarity on the religious situation was making it impossible for him to enforce order in the province.

In early 1562, royal commissioners were sent to Languedoc to try to bring the region back into full obedience to the king, the Catholics there complaining of the acts of the Huguenots. Michel Quelain and Jean de la Guesle reported to the crown that with Crussol absent from the province, away in Provence there was great disorder with 'new offences every day'. They hoped that with Joyeuse backing them up militarily they would be able to restore obedience of the king's edicts to the province. However civil war would erupt before they could have much impact.

=== First civil war ===
When civil war broke out in 1562, Joyeuse was left to face local Protestant uprisings without the main royal army for assistance. Pope Pius IV sent 2500 men under his nephew to support Joyeuse. His men pillaged the estates of governor Crussol during their movements. In early 1563, fearing a repeat of the Toulouse uprising the Parlement of Toulouse called on Blaise de Monluc and Joyeuse to a secret meeting, in which it was agreed to form a Catholic ligue for the defence of the faith against Protestantism. Despite this involvement, Joyeuse generally sought to enforce the Edict of Amboise though he maintained his connections with the extremists who opposed it. He received praise from the king for the zeal with which he enforced the kings will.

=== Second civil war ===
Joyeuse continued his military activities during the second civil war, travelling up the Rhône with 2000 foot and 600 horse to assist the Count of Tende. On the way they sieged the small fortifications that obstructed them until they reached Pont St. Esprit in February. This town proved harder, and the siege was broken off. While formal peace had been declared, operations continued in the south. Joyeuse diverted his forces across the Rhône on 7 March and captured Loudun, Orsennes and Tresques before reuniting with the count of Tende for another attack on Pont St. Esprit. The local Protestants under Montbrun decided to offer battle, but were defeated on the plains of Montfran on 24 May. With Languedoc subdued he ensured all towns under his command were properly garrisoned and sought to disarm those Protestants that remained at arms. He had difficult with bringing Montauban, Castres and Montpellier to order.

=== Third civil war ===
The flight south of Condé and the Huguenot nobility in late 1568 saw the viscounts of Languedoc, who had been an active force in both previous civil wars, attempt to bring juncture between their forces and those of the Protestant leadership. Joyeuse, together again with the count of Tende, governor of Provence intercepted the viscounts before they could link up, blocking their passage across the Rhône. Joyeuse raised further troops in Languedoc with the support of Sarlaboz. These were sent on to Brissac and Strozzi who were assembling a force at Dissay. This withdrawal from the Rhône allowed the viscounts to regroup and begin their operations again.

=== Massacre of Saint Bartholomew ===
As the Massacre of Saint Bartholomew spread out into the provinces rumours that the king wished for the death of all Protestants in France, filtered out across the country. Joyeuse refused to take advantage of these rumours to orchestrate a massacre in his locality. Nevertheless he used the opportunity to send orders to Nîmes to lay down their arms, and accept a royal garrison.

=== Fifth civil war ===
After the massacre, a faction of the Catholic nobility, known as the politiques began plotting a conspiracy to seize the king and queen mother and overturn the political settlement that ended the fourth civil war. The conspiracy was uncovered, and the duke of Montmorency and Artus de Cossé-Brissac were arrested for their part. Joyeuse was tasked with seizing Damville but he was able to evade Joyeuse's agents, thus leading the Malcontents (France) during the fifth civil war.

== Reign of Henri III ==
=== Fifth civil war ===
At the advent of Henri III's reign, Joyeuse was once more left to face off with the viscounts of Languedoc under Paulin.

=== Catholic League ===
As a liguer with the ascendency of Charles, Duke of Mayenne in the wake of the assassination of Henri III of France he was assigned as military leader of Languedoc. In this role he came into conflict with the militant bishop Saint-Gelais. Having just lost the town of Carcassonne to forces loyal to Navarre he entered the city of Toulouse on 30 September 1589. He wanted a temporary truce with Navarre such that his troops could recover, he further desired the disbanding of the local Confraternity of the Holy Ghost, viewing the militant Catholic organisation as a threat to civil order. The bishop responded by retreating to the island of Thunis on the Garonne from there he instructed his loyal followers to arm themselves, and several hundred of them stormed Joyeuse's residence in the city. With the help of his son, violence was averted, and he gained control of the city. Now in command he was able to win the confidence of much of the Parlement of Toulouse, alongside the capitouls and bureau d'état and leverage them to negotiate his way into leadership of the local ligue. Gelais left the city and Joyeuse remained in uncontested local leadership until his death. Regardless much of his time was consumed in military operations so he left lieutenants to preside over the ligue for much of the year.

== Sources ==
- Baird, Henry (1880). History of the Rise of the Huguenots: Vol 2 of 2. Hodder & Stoughton.
- Harding, Robert (1978). Anatomy of a Power Elite: the Provincial Governors in Early Modern France. Yale University Press.
- Holt, Mack P. (2005). The French Wars of Religion, 1562-1629. Cambridge University Press.
- Roberts, Penny (2013). Peace and Authority during the French Religious Wars c.1560-1600. Palgrave Macmillan.
- Salmon, J.H.M (1975). Society in Crisis: France during the Sixteenth Century. Metheun & Co.
- Thompson, James (1909). The Wars of Religion in France 1559-1576: The Huguenots, Catherine de Medici and Philip II. Chicago University Press.
- Vaissière, Pierre (1926). Messieurs de Joyeuse (1560-1615). Portraits et documents inédits. Albin Michel.
- Wood, James (2002). The Kings Army: Warfare, Soldiers and Society during the Wars of Religion in France, 1562-1576. Cambridge University Press.
