= Coinage of Philip IV of France =

Coins during rule of Philip IV

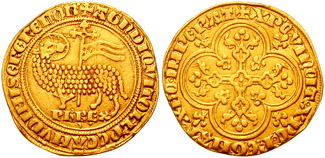
An agnel d'or.

The coinage of Philip IV of France (1268–1314, also known as "Philippe le Bel") marks the first mass diffusion of gold coinage in the Kingdom of France (before him, only his grandfather Saint Louis IX, had minted a few gold coins, the "Ecu"). Philip however had to resort extensively to monetary devaluations and reevaluations in order to finance his royal budget as well as his war efforts.

== Gold coinage ==
=== Florin d'or ===
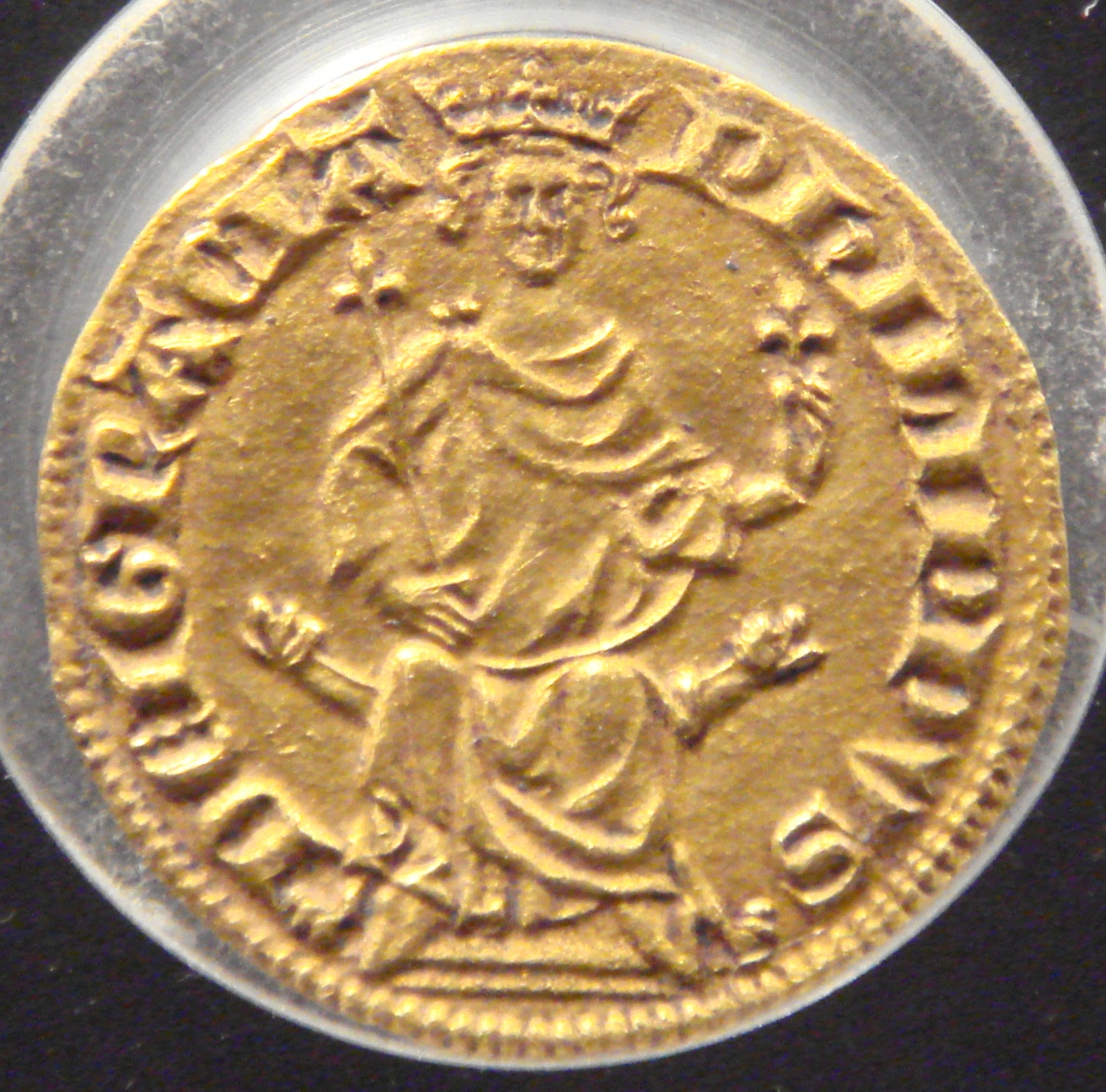
"Petit Royal assis" de Philippe IV, August 1290, gold 3.51g. Obv: "PhILIPPVS DEI GRATIA" "Philip, by the Grace of God". Rev: "FRANCORUM REX" "King of the French".

Philippe le Bel's golden Florin, also called "Petit Royal assis" ("Small seated Royal") was the first French gold coin to reach major circulation. It was first minted in August 1290. Its popularity was due to the fact that it was an authentic Florin, with a weight of 3.54 grams, and entirely made of pure gold (1.000 title). It was circulated without problem among the gold Florentine Florin and their imitations throughout Europe. At minting, the coin was attributed an account value of 10 sols tournois (half a pound).

=== Masse d'or ===
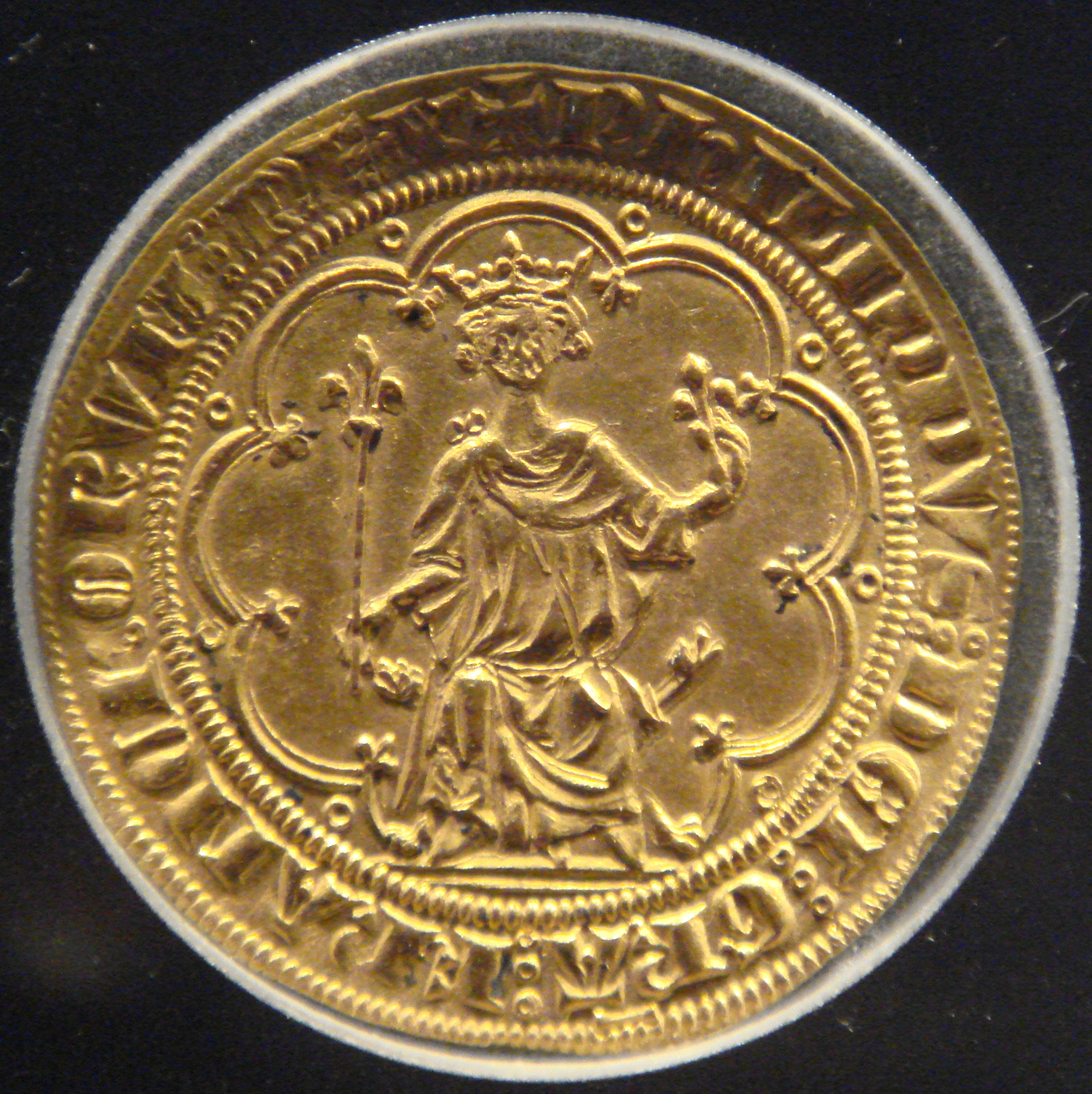
Masse de Philippe le Bel, 10 January 1296, gold, 7.04g. Obv: "PhILIPPVS:DEI:GRA(cia):FRANChORVM:REX" "Philip, by the Grace of God, King of the French".

This landmark coin of Philip the Fair, called a "Masse d'or", was issued soon after the "false" double-parisis and tournois of 1295. It was minted from 10 January 1296 to August 1310. This coin was supposed to be a "Double Florin", but it was actually debased (it was a "false" Double-Florin). The weight of the coin was indeed double that of the "Petit Royal assis" (7.10g), but its title was only 22 karats (instead of 24 karats), a title of only 0.916. The copper alloy used actually hardened the coin, so that it was nicknamed "Royal dur" ("Hard Royal"). Its value was one "livre Parisis" (one "Parisis pound"). It represented a major devaluation, and represented an attempt by Philip IV to obtain revenues through minting. At minting, the coin was attributed an account value of 25 sols tournois (one pound parisis).

=== Chaise d'or ===
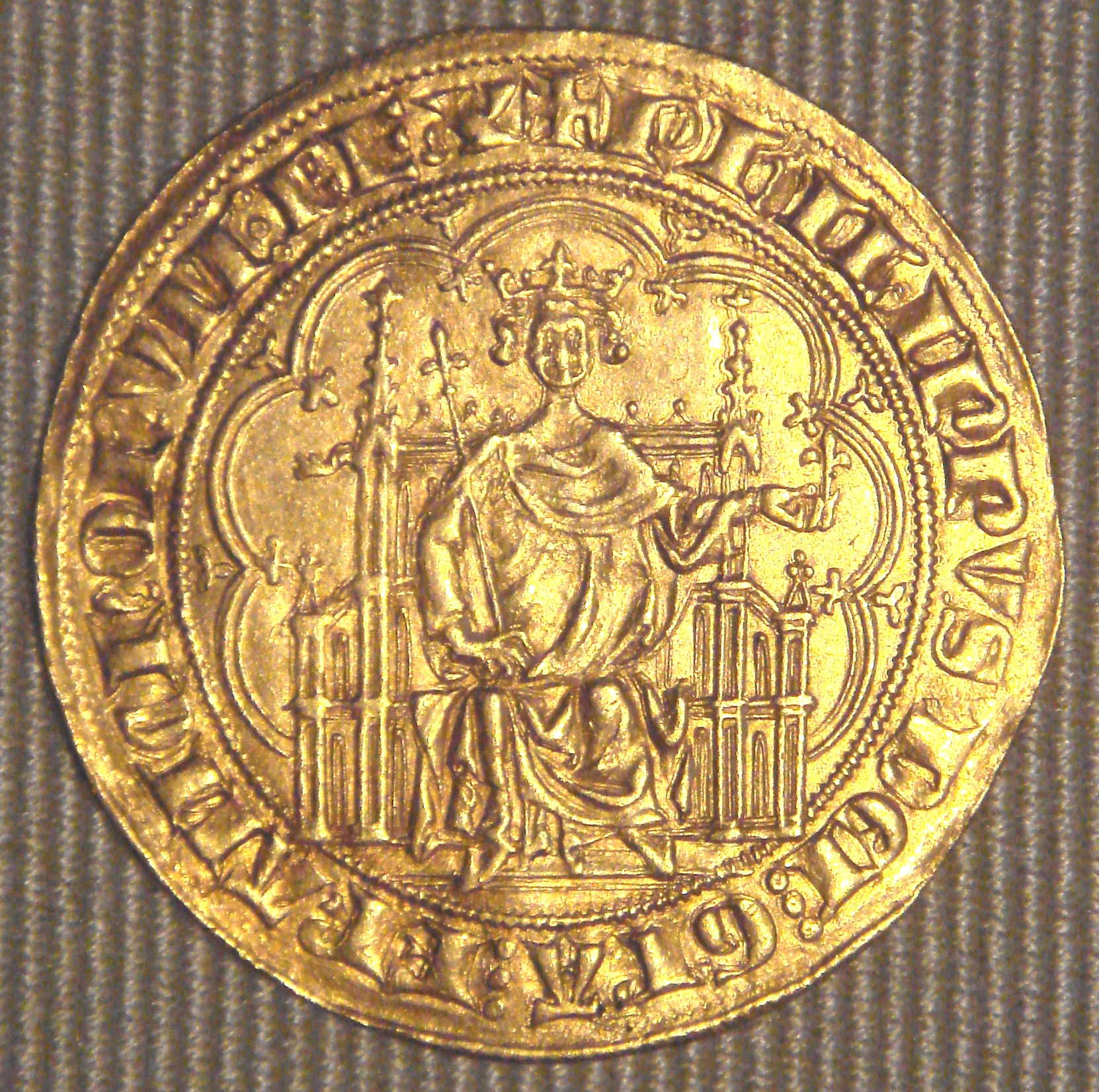
"Chaise d'Or" of Philip the Fair.

The "Chaise d'or" ("Golden throne") was a gold coin with the depiction of a large Gothic throne on which the king was seated. It was produced from August 22, 1303, and had a title of 1.000. This coin was an authentic double Florin, with a weight of 7.10g at 24 karats. It was meant to erase the memory of the debased billon coins which had been in circulation. This coin incorporates the first elements of Gothic architecture ever on a French coin.

The "Chaise d'Or" was worth 50 parisis sols, that is 2.5 parisis pounds at the time of minting.

=== Denier d'or de la Reine ===
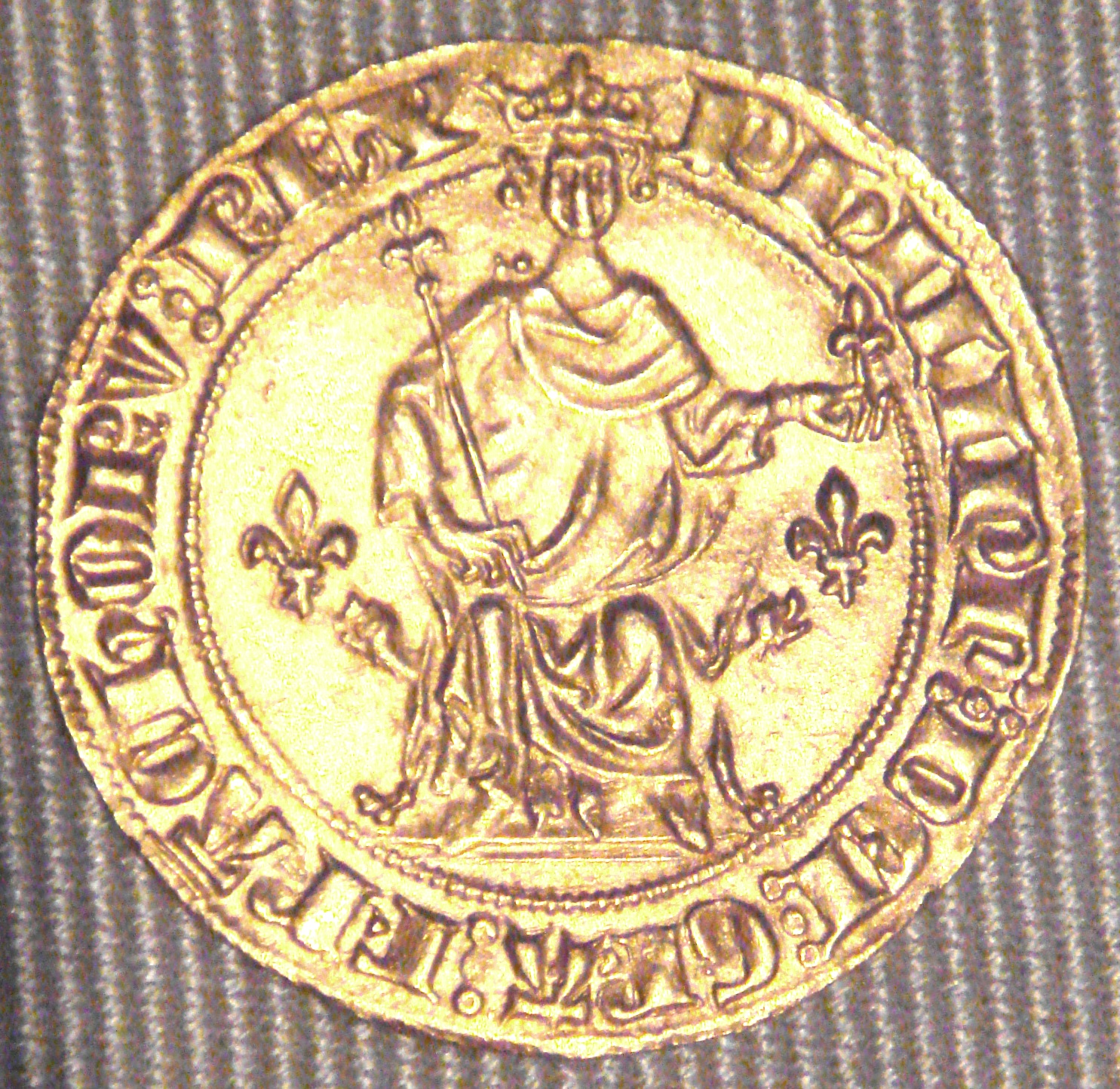
Another important coin of Philip IV: the "Denier d'or de la Reine".

The "Denier d'or de la Reine" was another important coin of Philip IV. It was minted from 1305, and had a title of 1.000. Its account value at the time of mint is unknown.

=== Agnel d'or ===
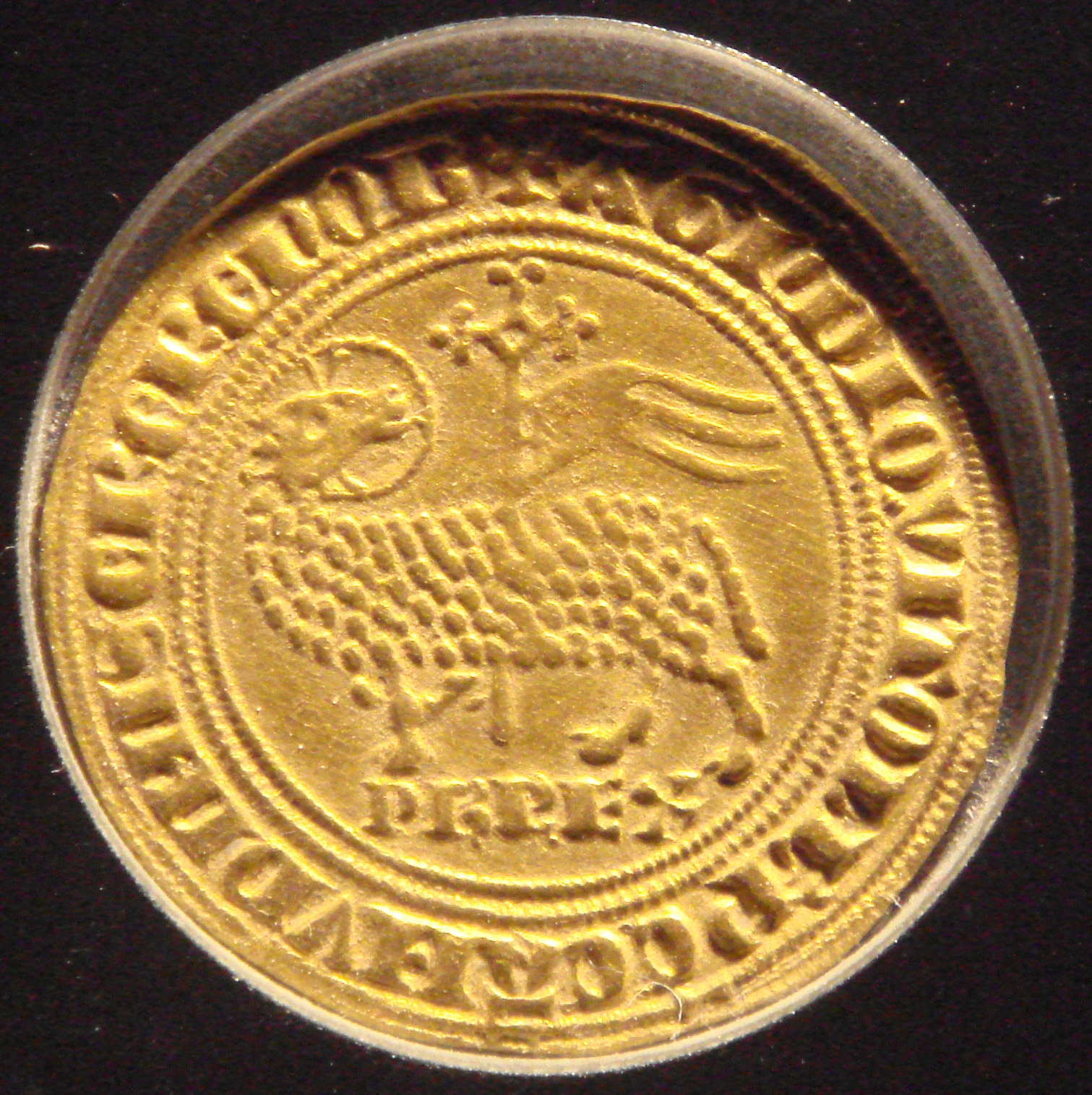
Agnel de Philippe le Bel, 26 January 1311, gold 4.01g. Obv: "AGN'(us)D(e)I'QVITOLL(is)P(e)CCA(ta)MV(n)DI MISERERE NOB'(IS) "Lamb of God burdened by the sins of the World, have mercy on us".

The Agnel d'or ("golden lamb") was the last gold coin of the reign of Philip the Fair. It had a weight of 4.13g and was composed of pure 24 karats gold. Its value was one Livre tournois or 15 Parisis sols (Sous Parisis).

Philip IV also minted a variety of silver and billon coins.

== Exhibits ==
- Monnaie de Paris
- Cabinet des Médailles
