= Waleran II of Ligny =

Waleran II of Luxembourg
- Lord of Ligny
- Coat of Arms of Waleran II.

Lord of Beauvoir and Roussy
- Reign: 1300–1354
- Predecessor: Joan of Beauvoir
- Successor: John I

Lord of Ligny and La Roche
- Reign: 1303–1354
- Predecessor: Henry II
- Successor: John I
- Died: 1354
- Burial: Church of Notre-Dame in Cambrai
- Spouse: Guyotte of Lille
- Issue: John I, Lord of Ligny
- House: Luxembourg
- Father: Waleran I of Luxembourg, Lord of Ligny
- Mother: Joan of Beauvoir

Waleran II of Luxembourg, Lord of Ligny (French: Waléran II de Luxembourg II; German: Walram II. von Ligny; died 1354), was a French nobleman and member of the House of Luxembourg. He was Lord of Beauvoir, Roussy and Ligny. He was a son of Waleran I and his wife, Joan of Beauvoir.

Walram initially inherited the castles of Beauvoir and Roussy from his mother. After the death of his brother Henry II in 1303, he also inherited his father's Lordship of Ligny.

He died in 1354 and was buried in the church of Notre-Dame in Cambrai.

He was married to Guyotte (died 1338), the heiress of the Burgraviate of Lille. Together they had a son:

- John I (died 1364).

== Sources ==
- Hoensch, Jorg K. (2000). Die Luxemburger: Ein spatmittelalterliche Dynastie gesamteuropaischer Bedeutung, 1308-1437 (in German). Verlag W. Kohlhammer. ISBN 3-17-015159-2.

Waleran II of Ligny House of Luxembourg-Ligny Died: 1354
| Preceded by Henry II | Lord of Ligny; 1303–1354 | Succeeded by John I |
