= Walram I =

Walram I or Waleran I may refer to:

- Waleran I of Meulan (died c. 986)
- Waleran I of Arlon (died c. 1053)
- Waleran I of Limburg (died 1082)
- Walram I, Count of Nassau (died 1198)
- Waleran I, Lord of Ligny (died 1288)
- Walram I of Zweibrücken (died 1308)
