= Walram II =

Walram II or Waleran II may refer to:

- Waleran II of Meulan (died c. 989)
- Waleran II of Arlon (11th century)
- Walram II of Limburg (c. 1085–1139)
- Walram II of Monschau (died 1242)
- Walram II, Count of Nassau (ca. 1220 – 1276)
- Waleran II, Lord of Ligny (died 1354)
- Walram II of Zweibrücken (died 1366)
