= John I of Ligny =

Nobleman

John I, Lord of Ligny

Lord of Ligny, La Roche, Beauvoir and Roussy
- Reign: 1354–1364
- Predecessor: Waleran II
- Successor: Guy I
- Born: 1313
- Died: 17 May 1364 (aged 50–51)
- Spouse: Alix of Dampierre
- Issue: Marie of Luxembourg; John, Lord of Roussy; Guy I, Count of Ligny; John, Archbishop of Strasbourg; Johanna of Luxembourg
- House: Luxembourg
- Father: Waleran II of Luxembourg, Lord of Ligny
- Mother: Guyotte of Lille

John I of Luxembourg (French: Jean I^{er} de Luxembourg; died: 17 May 1364), was a Lord of Ligny, Beauvoir, Roussy and La Roche from the House of Luxembourg. He was a son of Lord Waleran II and his wife, Guyotte of Lille. He was a 3rd generation descendant of Henry V, Count of Luxembourg.

Around 1330 John married Alix of Dampierre (d. 1346), the heiress of Guy of Dampierre-Richebourg. Their children were:

- Marie, married in 1347 to Count Henry of Vaudémont (d. 1365)
- John (d. 1360/61), Lord of Roussy, and priest
- Guy I (d. 22 August 1371), Count of Ligny and St. Pol
- John (d. 4 April 1373), Bishop of Strasbourg from 1365 to 1369 and Archbishop of Mainz from 1371 to 1373
- Johanna (d. 1392), married Count Guy V of Saint-Pol (d. 1360)

== Sources ==
- Hoensch, Jorg K. (2000). Die Luxemburger: Ein spatmittelalterliche Dynastie gesamteuropaischer Bedeutung, 1308-1437 (in German). Verlag W. Kohlhammer. ISBN 3-17-015159-2.

John I of Ligny House of Luxembourg-Ligny Died: 17 May 1364
Preceded by Waleran II	Lord of Ligny; 1354–1364	Succeeded by Guy I
