= Honorat I de Savoie =

- Seigneur de Sommerive
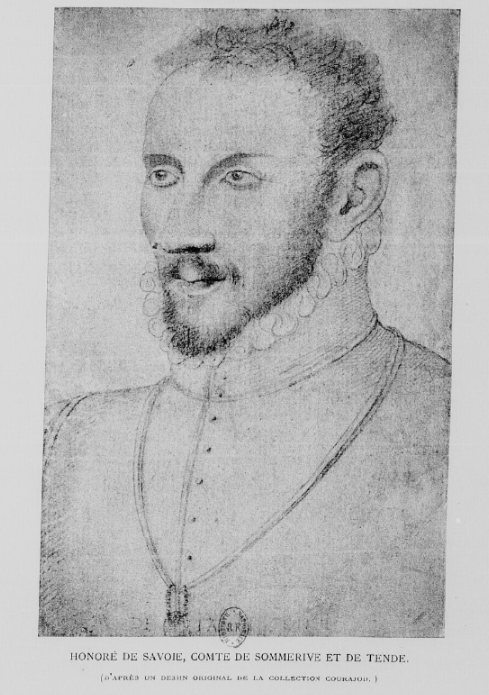
- Honorat I de Savoie, seigneur de Sommerive,
- Other titles: Count of Tende; Governor of Provence
- Born: October 1538; Marseille
- Died: 1 October 1572 (aged 34); Avignon
- Family: Savoie-Tende
- Spouse: Clarisse Strozzi
- Father: Claude de Savoie
- Mother: Marie de Chabannes

Honorat I de Savoie, seigneur de Sommerive (1538–1572) was a governor and soldier during the French Wars of Religion. He entered high office as lieutenant-general of Provence, appointed in 1562, serving under his father. He would take the opportunity civil war presented to usurp the authority of his father, and drive him into exile, temporarily claiming the title of governor for himself, before relinquishing it during peace. He fought for the crown loyally after this, aiding in the campaign against the viscounts of Languedoc in both the second and third civil war. His father died in 1566 and he inherited his titles despite his earlier rebellion. The crown would award him his father's office of governor of Provence shortly thereafter. He died on 8 October 1572.

== Early life and family ==
Honorat is known as 'Sommerive' to distinguish him from his uncle Honorat II of Savoy. Sommerive was the second son of Claude de Savoie count of Tende and governor of Provence since the death of René de Savoie in 1525, and Marie de Chabannes. His mother would die in childbirth, and his older brother would die young, leaving him the eldest child. He was a Catholic, and opposed the Protestantism of his step-mother and younger brother René, and the Protestant sympathies of his father Tende. Sent to court by his parents, he would make a positive impression in the political centre.

Sommerive would marry Clarisse Strozzi, daughter of Pietro Strozzi in May 1558. The marriage would be childless.

== Reign of Charles IX ==
=== Rebellion ===
In 1562 he was raised to the office of lieutenant-general of Provence by Catherine de' Medici, a role that put him on a collision course with his father. When civil war broke out, the subordinate Catholic governors of Provence, rallied to him instead of his father. With their backing, and an alliance with the militant Catholic partisans under Carcès he entered formal revolt against his father in May. In his letter explaining his actions he described himself as his 'very sorry son and servant.' He then set about imposing taxes, accompanying this with an ordinance explaining that his father was a prisoner of the Protestants, and need not be obeyed.

The rebellious Parlement of Aix proved receptive to this coup and allowed him to garrison the town. He made efforts to besiege Sisteron but despite making a breach was forced to withdraw. A little while later, he led his troops into the town of Orange where they committed a massacre of the Protestant population in June. He further introduced his garrison into Marseille, and with the assistance of Papal troops from Avignon drove his father into exile in Savoy for the remainder of the first civil war. Returning to Sisteron he seized it in early September. He made attempts with the comte de Suze to cross the Rhône with the aim of recovering Montpellier, however his army was intercepted by the southern Huguenots, and destroyed. In November the Parlement formerly recognised Sommerive as governor. In January 1563 he invited the Papal governor of the Comtat Venaissin to Aix, so that they could discuss measures to repress the Protestants in their respective territories.

=== Long peace and second civil war ===
With peace declared, Sommerive's fortunes declined. In late 1563 Biron was sent into the region under arms to bring Sommerive and Carcès back into line with the crown. They had continued since the peace to intimidate royal commissioners sent to enforce the Edict of Amboise. Biron recommended to the crown in April 1564 that the pair be summoned to court to answer for their actions.

Despite his violent rebellion against his father, when Claude drew up his will, it would be Sommerive that inherited his titles. The elderly count would note 'the ingratitudes and disobedience of Honorat, our eldest son, whose youth and bad judgement pitted him against us, as everyone knows to our great regret and displeasure, which would justify disinheriting him if we wished to'. He would be granted his father's position as governor of Provence on 23 April 1566.

Order began to collapse in his new governorship in late 1567 as the Protestant nobility attempted to seize the king during the Surprise of Meaux, and across France their co-religionists seized towns. In Provence the Huguenots seized Lauris and Cadenet and the baron de Cipières, his younger brother marched on Saint-Maximin with 500 men. The king wrote to him, urging him to put down the rebels in his governate. Sommerive raised 4000 men, and marched on Nîmes but withdrew without laying siege. He turned his attentions to his brother who was now in Sisternon. Having begun a siege, the two eventually spoke with one another, and Sommerive agreed to withdraw his forces in January.

With the Peace of Longjumeau bringing formal end to the second civil war in March 1568. Campaigning nevertheless continued in the south as both sides ignored the end of hostilities. Sommerive brought the Protestant lords d'Acier and Montbrun to battle at Montfrin and defeated them. Shortly thereafter the Protestant captain of Fréjus and his garrison were massacred with both the local authorities and Sommerive complicit in the act.

=== Third civil war to Saint Bartholomew ===
At the opening of the third civil war, Sommerive sent reinforcements to Anjou's army as it assembled on the Loire, he was able to raise 3000 troops for the royal army in his governorship. In alliance with Guillaume de Joyeuse he blocked Protestant forces under the viscounts of Languedoc from joining their forces to those of Condé.

Though he had sided with the radical Catholics during the first civil war, as the Massacre of Saint Bartholomew unfolded in 1572, he ignored the rumours spreading out from the capital that the king desired the liquidation of all Protestants and did not commit a massacre within his territory. It has therefore been argued his earlier alliance had less to do with religious convictions than an opportunistic desire to usurp his father's position. He died shortly thereafter on 8 October 1572.

== Sources ==
- Baird, Henry (1880). History of the Rise of the Huguenots: Vol 2 of 2. Hodder & Stoughton.
- Harding, Robert (1978). Anatomy of a Power Elite: the Provincial Governors in Early Modern France. Yale University Press.
- Panisse, Henri (1889). Les Comtes de Tendes de la Maison de Savoie. Librarie de Firmin-Didot et Cie.
- Romier, Lucien (1913). Les Origines Politiques des Guerres de Religion II: La Fin de la Magnificience Extėrieure le Roi Contre les Protestants (1555-1559). Librairie Académique Perrin et Cie.
- Salmon, J.H.M (1975). Society in Crisis: France during the Sixteenth Century. Metheun & Co.
- Thompson, James (1909). The Wars of Religion in France 1559-1576: The Huguenots, Catherine de Medici and Philip II. Chicago University Press.
