= Claude de Savoie =

French governor and commander

- Seigneur de Tende
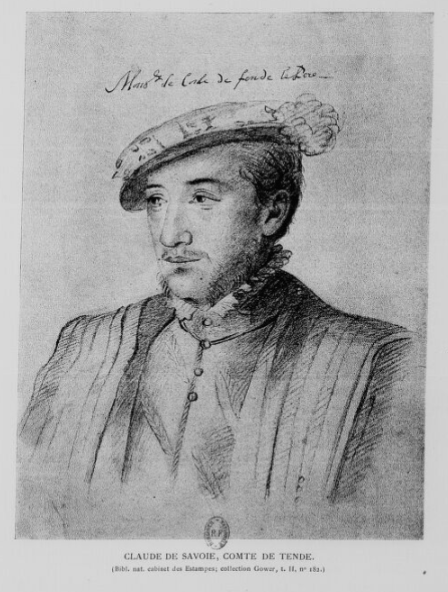
- Claude de Savoie, seigneur de Tende
- Other titles: Admiral of the Levant Sea; Count of Tende
- Born: 27 March 1507
- Died: 23 April 1566 (aged 59); Kingdom of France
- Family: Savoie-Tende
- Spouses: Marie de Chabannes; Françoise de Foix-Candale
- Issue: Honorat I de Savoie; René de Savoie-Tende
- Father: René of Savoy
- Mother: Anne Lascaris

Claude de Savoie (1507–1566) was a French governor and commander. Son of René of Savoy, Tende's career would begin at a young age, fighting at the Battle of Pavia in 1525. He served extensively throughout the later Italian Wars in particular holding a key role in the Italian War of 1536–1538 and the dauphins invasion of Roussillon. During this time he would establish himself as a moderate religious presence, keen to achieve compromise and avoid the brutality that typified the Massacre of Mérindol perpetrated by one of his subordinates in 1545. With the outbreak of civil war in 1562, his son Sommerive rallied the Catholics of Provence against him, and successfully drove him into exile. Restored to his office in 1563, he would lead the region for another 3 years before dying in 1566.

== Early life and family ==
Claude de Savoie was the eldest son of René of Savoy and Anne Lascaris, born on 27 March 1507.

Marriage negotiations took place between Tende and Adrienne d'Estouteville who refused to honour the contract, noting he had 'a bad odor' and 'kept the company of many women.' Tende for his part resented the prospect of renouncing his title that the contract would have involved. Frustrated at the failure of this match, Lascaris arranged a contract for Tende to marry Marie de Chabannes daughter of Jacques de Chabannes the governor of Bourbonnais. The contract was sealed in 1534. Anne, who held the title of Tende, Limon, Vernant and Loubet reserved rights to hold the titles formally until her death. He had a son with Marie, named Henri, however he did not reach adulthood. In 1538 Chabannes gave birth to a second son, Sommerive, however the birth would have fatal complications for the mother.

In 1539 Tende re-married, to Françoise de Foix-Candale with whom he had a third son, the baron de Cipières. Françoise was Protestant, and she instilled her faith in their younger son and sympathies in her husband. Sommerive by contrast remained Catholic in opposition to the remainder of his family.

His mother died in 1554, and with her death he inherited the lordship of Tende.

== Reign of François I ==
=== Entry to politics ===
In 1520 Tende was provided with the office of gentleman of the chamber, and later in that year his father presented him to the estates of Provence, which had assembled in Aix. René arranged for the relinquishing of his office of grand-seneschal in favour of his son while maintaining the title of governor of Provence for himself. At the age of seventeen he fought alongside his father at the Battle of Pavia and was taken prisoner. Ransomed for 30,000 écus he returned from captivity shortly after the death of his father. Upon René's death he assumed the roles of lieutenant-general and governor of Provence alongside his responsibilities as Admiral of the Levant Sea. In his capacity as Admiral he accompanied Marguerite for the negotiations that formed the Treaty of Madrid (1526).

In 1527 Lascaris mediated a dispute between Tende and his brother Villars by which Tende ceded 800 tournais pounds of income in exchange for Villars renouncing his rights to the Tende inheritance, further agreement was reached to exchange some land holdings relating to the barony of Pressigny and the county of Sommerive.

=== Invasion of Naples ===
Tende accompanied Lautrec on his invasion of Naples in 1529, and after the death of the captain of the Swiss regiments, was recommended as their new leader by Marshal Lautrec. Disease was destroying the French expedition, and when he returned to France Tende was very sick and took time in Lyon to recover. When Montmorency marched south to Bayonne to negotiate the release of the king's sons from Spanish captivity in 1530, Tende accompanied the diplomatic mission. In 1532 François elevated him to the Order of Saint Michael. The following year he was responsible for bringing the duchess of Urbino to France so that she might marry Orléans. To divide his responsibilities he established a separate office holder as lieutenant-general, choosing the seigneur de Puy-Martin.

=== Invasion of Provence ===
In 1536 Charles V invaded Provence with 60,000 men. Tende coordinated defence of the province from Aix, overseeing the defences for the city. The king established a strategy of creating no-mans lands so that Charles might be sapped of supplies, as a result those in the villages of Provence were ordered to bring all their livestock from the fields. Tende determined the city of Grasse untenable due to defects in its walls, and ordered it put to the torch. The emperor meanwhile had seized several towns across the Var. Tende was conscious he lacked the forces to impede the emperor and organised a retreat, leaving forces in the mountains around Grasse to harry their advance. The scorched earth policy continued as Tende retreated deeper into Provence. The brutal policy had its intended effect, after failing to siege Marseilles, and with his army disintegrating Charles was forced to retreat from Provence, crossing the Var again in September.

As the war continued, Tende accompanied the king in his entry to Piedmont, before a truce was agreed, and then peace in 1538. The terms of the peace were brokered in the lands of Provence, and Tende was responsible for transporting the parties to the location.

Around this time Tende fell out with the Parlement of Aix, unwilling to sanction their judgement against the village of Mérindol. Those in Mérindol would be exterminated in 1545. The deed was carried out by the new lieutenant-general of Provence, the comte de Grignan. With war resumed in 1541, Tende accompanied the dauphin on his campaign into Roussillon. After a failed siege of Perpignan Tende returned to his government in 1542.

== Reign of Henri II ==
Between 1549-1559 Tende sought to repair much of the damage that the ravages of war had done to his governorship in the prior year. He remained in good favour with the new king, with whom he had served in prior years, and for which he was granted the seigniory of Mujoulx. In 1554, wary of the movements of the duke of Savoy, Tende had forces camped at Mougins, observing their movements. Much of the most recent outbreak of war would however occur in northern France, and as a result his role was limited. He continued to coordinate with Brissac and the Turkish navy for potential operations against Nice as the king desired to capture the city.

== Reign of François II ==
Around this time dispute arose between the Protestant Antoine de Mauvans and the Parlement of Aix, Tende tried to mediate the dispute, as he had attempted at Mérindol, however Mauvans would be assassinated. Paulon de Mauvans swore vengeance for the killing of his brother, and began a campaign of terror across the countryside. Tende, urged to confront him by the court and local grandees, raised an army of 5000, and advanced on the rebellious noble. Finding him in his stronghold, Tende's instinct to negotiate arose, and he successfully convinced Mauvans that his conscience would not be infringed if he would disband his army and retire to a private life. He was able to inform Guise in November that 'everything is quiet in Provence.

== Reign of Charles IX ==
=== Breakdown of order ===
The quiet would however be a temporary illusion, shattered by the death of François II in December. Tende was attacked by the court for his soft approach to dealing with heresy. In particular Catherine wrote to him noting his failure to deal with the violence in Aix and urging him to make an example of those who cause disorder. Tende attempted to work with the Parlement of Aix to avoid a massacre of the towns Protestant population, but they were uninterested in acting against the perpetrators. The governor of Aix, Flassans led a vigilante organisation of militant Catholics that attacked Protestants. Tende worked with de Crussol in his opposition to Flassans.

=== First civil war ===
Tende entered the field against Flassans in early 1562, defeating his forces near Aix. To assist him against Flassans, Tende was working with Mauvans, who, upon capturing the base of Flassans support at Barjols perpetrated a massacre. Tende sent his son-in-law Jacques de Cardé to put a stop to it, however by the time he arrived in the town it was all over. Flassans brother Carcès reorganised the group on the lines of a ligue and reached out to form an alliance with Tende's son, Sommerive against him in May 1562. Sommerive began raising taxes, and explained to the notables of Provence that Tende was a prisoner of the Protestants, and as such his orders could safely be ignored. Together Sommerive and Carcès took the towns of Aix and Marseille from Tende, and in late 1562 drive him into exile in Savoy. In November the Parlement of Aix recognised Sommerives usurpation of power, declaring him the governor of Provence in lieu of Tende.

=== Making the peace ===
With the Edict of Amboise ending hostilities in Provence, much disorder remaining in the region. The provincial estates refused to accept Protestant worship despite the terms of the peace, and the Parlement' refused to register it. Their defiance, in combination with the continued presence of armed Protestant militia's in the region, persuaded the royal court to send Biron south with several commissioners and 500 soldiers. He reduced the Protestant garrison of Sisteron, persuaded the Catholic nobility to get into line with the edict, and re-installed Tende as governor of Provence, returning him from exile to Marseille. The Parlement would prove tenacious in its opposition however and in November 1563 the most militant members were suspended and replaced with judges from Paris.

=== Death ===
Despite the rebellion of his son against him, in determining his inheritance, he maintained that it was right his eldest son inherit his lands, noting 'the ingratitude and disobedience of Honorat, our eldest son, whose youth and bad judgement pitted him against us, as everyone knows, to our great regret and displeasure, which would justify disinheriting him if we wished to'.

== Sources ==
- Baumgartner, Frederic (1988). Henry II: King of France 1547-1559. Duke University Press.
- Harding, Robert (1978). Anatomy of a Power Elite: the Provincial Governors in Early Modern France. Yale University Press.
- Panisse, Henri (1889). Les Comtes de Tendes de la Maison de Savoie. Librarie de Firmin-Didot et Cie.
- Salmon, J.H.M (1975). Society in Crisis: France during the Sixteenth Century. Metheun & Co.
