= Anne Lascaris =

French noblewoman

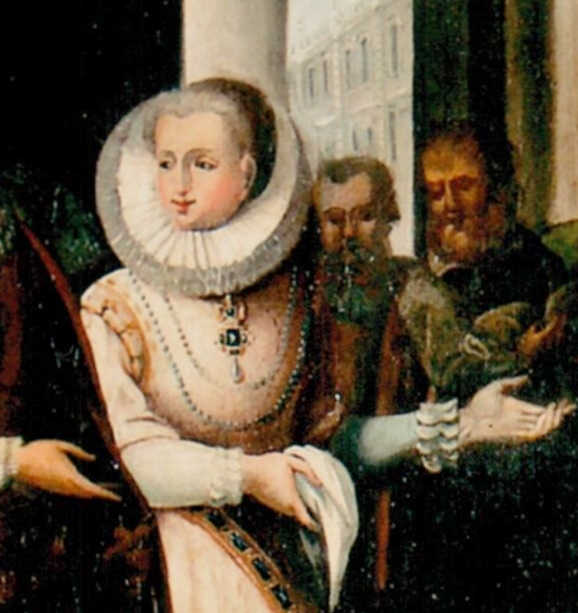
Anna Lascaris Countess of Tenda, in a detail of the 18th century painting preserved at the Commune of Limone Piemonte.

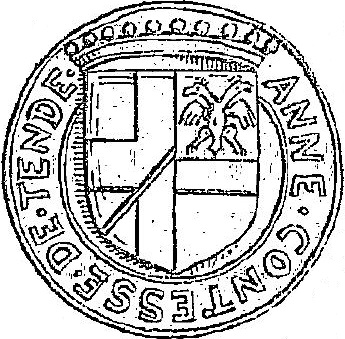
Seal of Anna, 1534

Anne Lascaris, countess of Tende and of Villars (November 1487 – July 1554), was a French noblewoman. She was the daughter of Jean-Antoine II de Lascaris, comte de Tende and Ventimiglia, lord of Mentone, and Isabeau (or Isabelle) d'Anglure-Estoges.

At 11 and a half years old, Anne married Louis de Clermont-Lodève, vicomte de Nébousan, then on 28 January 1501 she married René, le Grand Bâtard de Savoie 1468-1525), comte de Villars-en-Bresse, governor of Nice and Provence, admiral of France. With no male heirs, her father's properties and titles devolved on Anne at his death on 13 August 1509. Anne and René had the following children.

- Madeleine (c. 1510 - c. 1586), married Anne de Montmorency
- Claude of Savoy (27 March 1507 – 23 April 1566), count of Tende
- Honorat II of Savoy (1509-20 September 1580), count of Villars, marshal of France in 1571, married Françoise de Foix
- Marguerite, wife of Antoine II Luxembourg-Ligny (died 1557), count of Brienne
- Isabeau, wife of René de Batarnay, count of Bouchage

In 1515, Lucien, Lord of Monaco bought the feudal rights over the city of Mentone, from the family of Anne Lascaris, thus bringing the city, as a whole, under Monaco's sovereignty until the French Revolution.

== Sources ==
- Marshall, Rosalind Kay (2006). Queen Mary's Women: Female Relatives, Servants, Friends and Enemies of Mary, Queen of Scots. John Donald. ISBN 978-0859766678.
