= County of Brienne =

Medieval French county

Coordinates: 48.39°N 4.53°E

Coat of arms of the House of Brienne (Counts of Brienne)

The County of Brienne was a medieval county in France centered on Brienne-le-Château.

== Counts of Brienne ==
- Engelbert I (c. 950 – c. 968)
- Engelbert II (c. 968 – c. 990)
- Engelbert III (c. 990 – c. 1008)
- Engelbert IV (c. 1008 – c. 1035)
- Walter I (c.1035 – c. 1090)
- Erard I (c. 1090 – c. 1120?)
- Walter II (c. 1120? – c. 1161)
- Erard II (c. 1161 – 1191)
- Walter III (1191–1205)
- Walter IV (1205–1246)
  - John of Brienne (1205/1206–1221), ruled on behalf of the above
- John I (1246– c. 1260)
- Hugh (c. 1260–1296)
- Walter V (1296–1311)
- Walter VI (1311–1356)
- Isabella (1356–1360) with her son:
- Sohier (1356–1364)
- Walter VII (1364–1381)
- Louis I (1381–1394)
- Margaret (1394–1397) with her husband:
- John II (1394–1397)
- Peter I, comte de St-Pol (1397–1433)
- Louis II, comte de St-Pol (1433–1475)
- Peter II, comte de St-Pol (1475–1481)
- Anthony I, Count of Ligny (1481–1519)
- Charles I, Count of Ligny (1519–1530)
- Anthony II, Count of Ligny (1530–1557)
- John III, Count of Ligny (1557–1576)
- Charles II, Duke of Brienne, (1576–1608) (created Duke of Brienne in 1587; extinct on his death)
- Louise, Countess of Brienne (1608–1647)
- Louise de Béon (1647–1665) with her husband:
- Henri-Auguste de Loménie, comte de Brienne (1647–1666)
- Louis Henri de Loménie, comte de Brienne (1666–1698)
- Andrew Louis Henri de Loménie, comte de Brienne (1698–1743)
- Nicholas Louis de Loménie, comte de Brienne (1743–1758)
- Athanase Louis Marie de Loménie, comte de Brienne (1758–1794)
