= Charles I of Ligny =

Count of Ligny and Brienne (1488–1530)

Charles I, Count of Ligny
- Born: 1488
- Died: 1530 (aged 41–42)
- Noble family: House of Luxembourg
- Spouse: Charlotte of Estouteville
- Issue Detail: Anthony II, Count of Ligny; Louis III, Count de Roussy; Jean, Bishop of Pamiers; George, Baron de Ghistelles
- Father: Anthony I, Count of Ligny
- Mother: Françoise of Croÿ-Chimay

Charles I, Count of Ligny, (1488–1530) was the ruling Count of Ligny and Brienne.

== Early life ==
Born as the son of Anthony I, Count of Ligny, and his second wife, Françoise of Croÿ-Chimay. He belonged to the collateral branch of the House of Luxembourg.

== Biography ==
In 1519, he succeeded his father as Count of Brienne and Count of Ligny. Charles II, his great-grandson, was imprisoned after buying a copy of William Byrd's Gradualia on the basis of Catholic tensions [needs editing: William Byrd was born in 1539 or 1540].

== Marriage and issue ==
In 1510, he married Charlotte of Estouteville; they had the following children:

- Anthony II (d. 8 February 1557)
- Louis III, Count de Roussy (d. 11 May 1571) married Antoinette d'Amboise (1552); no issue
- Jean, Bishop of Pamiers (d. 1548)
- George, Baron de Ghistelles (d. after 30 September 1537)
- Guillemette married François de Vienne, Baron de Ruffey
- Françoise (d. 17 June 1566), married firstly to Bernhard III, Margrave of Baden-Baden; married secondly to Adolf IV, Count of Nassau-Wiesbaden (1518-1556)
- Antoinette (1525 – 30 September 1603), Abbess of Yerres
- Marie (d. 15 March 1597), Abbess in Troyes

Charles I of Ligny House of Luxembourg Born: 1448 Died: 1530
Preceded by Anthony I	Count of Ligny; Count of Brienne; 1519-1530	Succeeded by Anthony II
