= François de Luxembourg =

French noble, prince étranger, military commander and diplomat

- Duke of Piney
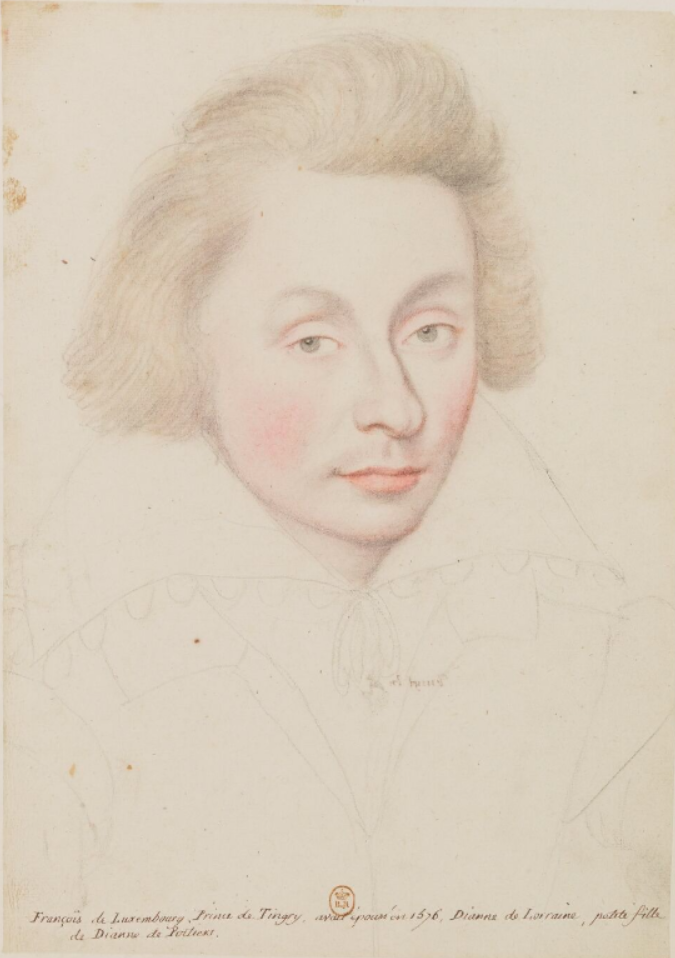
- Sketch of the duc de Piney by François Quesnel
- Born: 1563
- Died: c. 1613
- Noble family: House of Luxembourg
- Spouses: Diane de Lorraine (1576-1586); Marguerite de Lorraine (1599-1613)
- Issue: Henri de Luxembourg, Duke of Piney (from the 1st marriage)
- Father: Anthony II, Count of Ligny
- Mother: Margaret of Savoy

François de Luxembourg, duc de Piney (1563–c. 1613) was a French noble, prince étranger, military commander and diplomat during the latter French Wars of Religion. Born into a sovereign noble family, Piney expected an esteemed place in the French court. He fought for Henry III during the sixth war of religion under the nominal command of the king's brother Alençon seeing combat at La Charité-sur-Loire and Issoire. The following year, 1578, he was elevated as a chevalier de l'Ordre de Saint-Michel, although he complained frustratedly to the secretary of state about how we was shut out from access to the king's person.

In 1581, his lordship of Piney was elevated to a duché-pairie, in a flurry of royal erections for new peers of the realm, making Piney among the most senior members of the nobility. During 1588 Henri, frustrated at the influence the Guise family had over his rule, assassinated the duke of Guise. In the wake of this coup, many cities defected from the crown. Approached by royalists in Reims, Henry nominated Piney as the new governor of the city, however this alienated the Catholic League which saw him as too royalist, and they joined the ligueur Sainte-Union. When Henry in turn was assassinated on 1 August, Piney quickly swore himself to the Protestant Henry IV, after the king had promised to protect Catholicism. He served Henry as his ambassador to the states of Italy in early 1590, securing Venice's recognition of Henry IV as king, and receiving a warm reception from the Pope despite his master's Protestantism. He would again serve as ambassador to the Pope in 1598, during Henry's attempt to annul his marriage, though without succeeding in acquiring Papal approval. He died in 1613.

== Early life and family ==
Coat of arms of Piney, featuring the collars of the Order of Saint-Michel and Saint-Esprit

During 1574, Piney pursued a relationship with Louise of Lorraine, the Lorraine family ruling not far from his duchy of Piney. However, upon Henry's return to France from his kingship in the Commonwealth, he took up with Louise, and the two became king and queen. Henry wrote to Piney, to explain that, as he had taken the duke's mistress, in return he offered his own mistress Renée de Rieux. Piney declined the offer of marriage with Renée.

On 8 August 1576 Piney married into the Lorraine family, powerful neighbours of his estates in eastern France. At Meudon he married Diane de Lorraine, sister to the duke of Aumale. Explaining the marriage to a family ally in November, Antoinette de Bourbon, the woman's grandmother explained to Jacques, Duke of Nemours that Piney was very rich, was financially solvent, and had a nice house and furniture.

Diane died in 1586 and Piney remarried to Marguerite of Lorraine in 1599, the daughter of Nicolas of Lorraine, duke of Mercœur and of Joan of Savoy. Marguerite would outlive her husband, dying in 1625.

== Reign of Henry III ==
After the generous Peace of Monsieur which had brought the fifth civil war to a close was broken off and civil war resumed in 1577, the king's brother Alençon, keen to demonstrate his newfound loyalty to the crown, volunteered to lead the royal army against the rebels he had allied with in the previous war. His request was granted and on 7 April he departed Blois with a royal army. Piney joined him for the campaign and fought under his nominal command (though actual command of the army was under the more experienced duke of Nevers. He resultingly fought at the sieges of La Charité-sur-Loire and Issoire, both of which were subjected to brutal sacks for their resistance. The Estates General of 1576 had not however granted Henry any funds for this army, and as a result it disintegrated due to desertions as the year continued. After Issoire, the army was in no condition to continue fighting, and Henry established peace with the Treaty of Bergerac on 17 September 1577.

The following year, Henry honoured Piney with an elevation as a knight of the Order of Saint Michael, the highest order of chivalry in France until it was superseded by his new Order of the Holy Spirit in 1578. Despite this high honour, Piney was not particularly close with the king, and he complained to the secretary of state Villeroy that royal grace relied on the physical closeness and presence of the king, and that without it he was unsure how to proceed. Henry administered through a far more cloistered style of governance than his predecessors had.

Henry engaged in a flurry of elevations of lordships to the status of duché-pairie in 1581. Joyeuse was elevated for Anne de Joyeuse in August, the marquisate of Elbeuf for Charles de Lorraine, in September, Piney was raised for Piney in October, and both Retz and Épernon were raised for Retz and Épernon in November.

With the election of Pope Sixtus V to the pontificate in 1586, Piney was dispatched by Henry as his ambassador to congratulate him.

=== Reims ===
Shortly after the assassination of the duke of Guise, many cities in France defected from the king to the cause of the League. Reims was not initially among them, and during January 1589, it hung in the balance between ligueur and royalist elements on its council. The royalists dispatched Regnault Feret, lord of Montlaurent, to the king, to ask him to appoint a governor. Montlaurent wished for Henry to select someone who was seen as a neutral figure, as the ligueur citizens would reject a royalist. Henry chose Piney for the task, due to his family ties to the Guise through his marriage. The council of Reims at large received news of Piney's appointment on 27 January and baulked. An investigation was launched into the royalists who had made the request to Henry, while a letter was dispatched to Piney informing him they would not be in need of his services. The ligueurs on the council seized the moment, and on 9 February they ratified their membership of the Sainte Union in an extraordinary session. To rile up the population for this momentous decision, Piney's reply to the council was read out.

== Reign of Henry IV ==
=== Loyalist ===
When on 1 August 1589 Henry was murdered, Navarre, now styling himself Henry IV, was in a potentially vulnerable position. Many noblemen who had served the Catholic king were unable to stomach the prospect of a Protestant king, and defected from the royal camp. Henry moved to quiet fears of his rule, promising to respect and protect the Catholic church, and to receive teachings in Catholicism in future. This promise was sufficient for a core group of Catholic notables, among them Dinteville, lieutenant-general of Champagne, Marshal Aumont, and Biron, the governor of Picardy, Longueville, and Piney, who swore their allegiance to him. With these declarations ensured, Henry was acclaimed by his soldiers.

In a letter sent to Ferdinando I de' Medici, Grand Duke of Tuscany, explaining the reasoning for Cathlolics to support Henry, Piney was among the signatories.

=== Ambassador ===
Henry selected Piney for the sensitive mission of explaining the Catholic support for Henrt to the Pope. Piney travelled first to the Republic of Venice in December before heading to Mantua and Ferrara to defend Henry. Venice agreed to recognise Henry IV as king of France at this time, the first Catholic power in Europe to do so, and dispatched an ambassador to him. Piney then travelled to Tuscany, where he met with Ferdinando in secret to perform much the same mission. Finally he arrived in Rome and was granted an audience with Pope Sixtus V on 14 January 1590.

Sixtus gave him a comfortable reception, allowing Piney to sit down in his presence, an honour usually reserved for the ambassadors of kings, something Sixtus did not recognise Piney to be. Piney outlined the royalist narrative of events in the kingdom to the Pope, provided the manifesto of the royalist Catholics, and confided in him the promises towards Catholicism Henry had made. After this meeting, the ligueur Enrique de Guzmán, 2nd Count of Olivares, and allied Cardinals attempted to convince Sixtus to have Piney dismissed. However Sixtus refused, and met again with the prince on 19 January.

At their second meeting, Piney assured Sixtus that Henry was not a true heretic, and that he was ready to abandon his errors if they were made known to him. He informed the Pope that Henry would even affirm the real presence if necessary. Sixtus was approving of what he heard, an attitude no doubt in part fostered by the military success Henry was experiencing currently after his victory at Arques. With a ligueur victory looking remote, some form of accommodation would be needed with the ruler of a key European kingdom.

=== Coronation ===
On 27 February 1594, Henry entered Chartres Cathedral for his coronation. Representing the lay peers for the ceremony were the Bourbon prince Conti, Henri's cousin Montpensier and the prince étranger Piney.

With Henry increasingly distant from his former Protestant co-religionists, he discussed the intimate details of negotiations that were taking place between himself and the Protestant leaders with Piney. Ultimately the famous Edict of Nantes would provide limited toleration to Protestantism.

In February 1598, Henry was moving towards the annulment of his marriage to Marguerite de Valois so that he could marry Marie de Médicis. Piney, in his capacity as ambassador to Rome, returned to the French court empty handed that month, not having secured the Pope's assent, though the Pope had not yet been officially informed of the move, he had been made aware by Cardinal Joyeuse.

== Sources ==
- Babelon, Jean-Pierre (2009). Henri IV. Fayard.
- Carroll, Stuart (2011). Martyrs and Murderers: The Guise Family and the Making of Europe. Oxford University Press.
- Chevallier, Pierre (1985). Henri III: Roi Shakespearien. Fayard.
- Constant, Jean-Marie (1996). La Ligue. Fayard.
- George, Hereford Brooke (1875). Genealogical Tables Illustrative of Modern History. Oxford at the Clarendon Press.
- Jouanna, Arlette (1998). Histoire et Dictionnaire des Guerres de Religion. Bouquins.
- Konnert, Mark (2006). Local Politics in the French Wars of Religion: The Towns of Champagne, the Duc de Guise and the Catholic League 1560-1595. Ashgate.
- Le Roux, Nicolas (2000). La Faveur du Roi: Mignons et Courtisans au Temps des Derniers Valois. Champ Vallon.
- Le Roux, Nicolas (2006). Un Régicide au nom de Dieu: L'Assassinat d'Henri III. Gallimard.
