= Anthony II, Count of Ligny =

- Died: 8 February 1557
- Noble family: House of Luxembourg
- Spouse: Margaret of Savoy
- Issue: John III, Count of Ligny; François de Luxembourg; Anthony; Henry; Madeleine
- Father: Charles I, Count of Ligny
- Mother: Charlotte of Estouteville

Anthony II, Count of Ligny (died 8 February 1557) was the son of Count Charles I and his wife Charlotte of Estouteville. In 1530, he succeeded his father as Count of Ligny and Brienne.

In 1535, he married Margaret, a daughter of René of Savoy, Count of Villars. They had the following children:

- John III (d. 1576)
- François
- Anthony (d. 1573)
- Henry
- Madeleine (d. 1588), married Christophe Jouvenel des Ursins. Marquis de Traînel

Anthony II, Count of Ligny House of Luxembourg Died: 8 February 1557
Preceded by Charles I	Count of Ligny; Count of Brienne; 1530-1557	Succeeded by John III
