= Honorat II of Savoy =

Honorat II de Savoie
- Seigneur de Villars
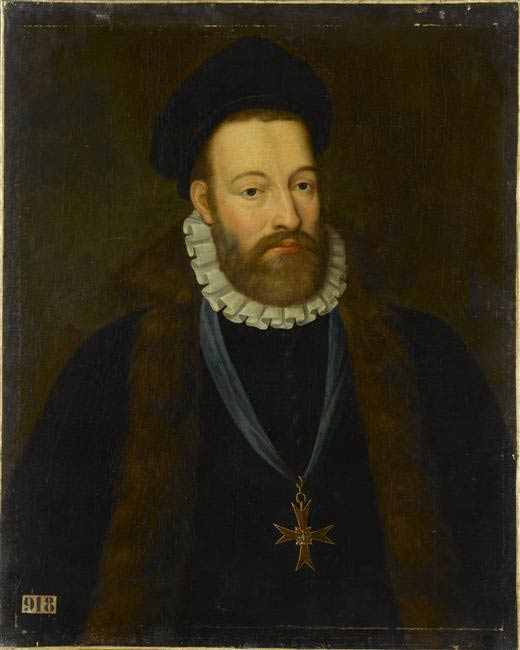
- Honorat II de Savoie, marquis de Villars, Amiral de France en 1569, musée historique de Versailles in 1834.
- Other titles: Admiral of France; Marshal of France; Count of Tende
- Born: ~1511
- Died: 20 September 1580 (aged 69); Le Grand-Pressigny, Kingdom of France
- Family: Savoie-Tende
- Spouse: Jeanne de Foix, Vicomtesse de Castillon
- Issue: Henriette de Savoie-Villars
- Father: René of Savoy
- Mother: Anne Lascaris

Honorat de Savoie, marquis of Villars (c. 1511 – 20 September 1580, Le Grand-Pressigny) was a marshal of France and admiral of France. Born into a cadet branch of the House of Savoy, he fought for first Francis I, and then Henri II during the Italian Wars. This included fighting at Hesdin and the battle of Saint-Quentin. During this period he also conducted diplomacy for the French court, and was involved in the negotiations that brought an end to the Italian Wars. Subsequently, he received the office of lieutenant-general of Languedoc, in which he suppressed Huguenots for several years before resigning the commission in 1562.

During the French Wars of Religion he fought at Rouen, Saint-Denis and Moncontour. During the third civil war he received the office of Admiral for the first time, before it was restored to Coligny when peace was declared.

Further promotion awaited him during the peace, as he attained first the office of lieutenant-general of Guyenne then the title of Marshal in 1571, and finally the office of Admiral again, upon the death of Coligny during the Massacre of Saint Bartholomew. He would hold this incredibly prestigious title until 1578, when he was compelled to resign it in favour of Charles, Duke of Mayenne. He died in 1580.

== Early life and family ==
Honorat de Savoie was the second son of René of Savoy and Anne of Lascaris. The exact year of his birth is uncertain, but it cannot have been earlier than 1511.

He held the titles of first Comte then Marquis of Villars, Comte de Tende et Sommerieve, Baron de Pressigny-le-Grand et Hauvet, Seigneur de Loyes, Marro, Préla, Vernant, Limon, Villeneuve, Cipières, La Garde, Loubet, Antibes and Ferrières-Lar-çon. During his career he would also become first Marshal and then Admiral of France, lieutenant-general in Guyenne and a member of the Order of Saint-Michel.

In 1540 he married Jeanne Françoise de Foix, viscountess of Castillon (†1542), with whom he only had one child, Henriette de Savoie-Villars († 1611), who married Charles, Duke of Mayenne.

He first appears in the records upon receipt of a gift from Francis I who granted him several seigneuries at Blois in 1524. Around the year 1531 he likely reached his majority, as it was on 25 August 1531 that he was granted the county of Villars by the Duke of Savoy. In 1533 he became a gentleman of the chamber.

== Reign of Francis I ==
In 1536 he campaigned in Picardy for France, as part of the Italian Wars. The following year he fought under Admiral Annebault fighting at Thérouanne where the Admiral was taken prisoner. In the early 1540s he campaigned in Roussillon under the authority of the Dauphin, fighting alongside his brother Claude, Count of Tende. As a gentleman of the chamber he had frequent need to be at court, and it was in one of his stays at Rambouillet that Francis I died.

== Reign of Henri II ==
The advent of a new reign brought promotion to Villars, in 1547 he was made lieutenant-general of Languedoc. He was further elevated to the Order of Saint-Michel. He accompanied Henry II of France on his 1552 entry into Lorraine to seize the three bishoprics of Toul Verdun and Metz. In 1553 he was involved in the attempts to relieve the siege of Hesdin from Duke of Savoy, the effort would be a failure and he would be captured. By 1554 he had been released, and Villars received further office from Henri, being granted the Seigneurie of Loches. He spent time in the court of the Duke of Ferrara and was regularly subject to the dukes complaints about the conduct of the war. He was heavily wounded at battle of Saint-Quentin on 10 August 1557, with those around him doubting he would survive but before he could fully heal he threw himself into relieving the siege of Corbie, attacking the Spanish besiegers with 300 men, and succeeding in having the siege lifted. Alongside the sons of Montmorency, Villars was sent to negotiate with the duke of Savoy, arriving in the Spanish camp in late October 1558, and being treated to dinner by the duke. Subsequent to the negotiations he was invited to the tournament to celebrate the peace, at which Henri II was killed in a jousting accident.

== Reign of Francis II ==
With the death of Henri II, the religious situation in the kingdom, which had been precarious, deteriorated into disorder, as emboldened Calvinists began to assert their worship publicly, particularly in the wake of the Conspiracy of Amboise. This represented a particular issue for Villars in his position as lieutenant-general of Languedoc, a region where the reformation was strongest, resulting his efforts were consumed suppressing 'seditious conduct'. From this position he oversaw the arrest of preachers and their supporters, before having many of them executed without trial.

== Reign of Charles IX ==
=== First civil war ===
In March 1562, he resigned his post as lieutenant-general of Languedoc to Joyeuse. With the outbreak of the French Wars of Religion in the following month, he was tasked by Charles with reporting on the situation in Poitou, he visited the city of Châtellerault and informed the king of the inhabitants continued loyalty. He joined up with the main royal army for the siege of Rouen in October.

=== Long peace ===
With peace declared in 1563, he accompanied Charles and the queen mother on their grand tour of France, aimed at reinforcing the provinces loyalty to the crown, and dealing with reticence in adhering to the Edict of Amboise. While following the monarchy on this tour in 1565, the duke of Savoy elevated his county of Villars into a marquisate. In 1566 he was among the grandees at the Assemblée des Grands de France held at Moulins, the result of the grandees deliberations being the Ordinance of Moulins which aimed to bring order back to the divided country.

=== Second and third civil war ===
He fought for the crown during the second of the French Wars of Religion, fighting at Saint-Denis in 1567.

During the third civil war he fought at the decisive royal victory at Jarnac and Moncontour. At the former, noticing the presence of Robert Stuart, who had killed his brother-in-law Montmorency on the field at Saint-Denis, he had Stuart summarily executed. At Moncontour, Villars was among the gentleman who rescued the young Anjou after he was unhorsed during a charge. With Coligny declared a public enemy by the Parlement de Paris in 1569, his offices were forfeit. As a result, Villars became Admiral of France.

=== Admiral of France ===
In 1570, he succeeded Blaise de Monluc as lieutenant of Guyenne. He was quickly subject to the same barrage of complaints about edict violations from Jeanne d'Albret as had his predecessor been. In this role he became increasingly involved in the local Catholic leagues that had been formed in the province during the prior decade. The king rewarded him further for his service by making him marshal of France on 30 November 1571. After the death of Gaspard II de Coligny during the Massacre of Saint Bartholomew he again took possession of the title of Admiral alongside a position on the conseil privé. With all these new offices, he was relieved of his role as lieutenant-general of Guyenne in favour of his son-in-law. He further inherited those titles belonging to his nephew Honorat I de Savoie upon his death in October 1572, making him Comte de Tende et Sommerieve.

In his new role as Admiral of France, he fought alongside Anjou during the fourth civil war, leading Gascon troops with the aims of reducing the town of Montauban before being forced to divert them to Anjou's Siege of La Rochelle (1572-1573). The troops had been so ill-disciplined he had made little progress against the town. He wrote despairingly to the Queen Mother about the difficulties he was having with paying his men, and the resulting damage this was causing to the countryside. With Damville going into rebellion in 1574 as leader of the politique party, Villars was offered his former role of 'commandant' of Languedoc however he declined the office. He was dismissed as admiral in 1578 in favour of his relation Charles de Lorraine, duc de Mayenne. He was appointed to the Order of the Holy Spirit on 1 January 1579.

== Sources ==
- Harding, Robert (1978). Anatomy of a Power Elite: the Provincial Governors in Early Modern France. Yale University Press.
- Panisse, Henri (1889). Les Comtes de Tendes de la Maison de Savoie. Librarie de Firmin-Didot et Cie.
- Roelker, Nancy (1968). Queen of Navarre: Jeanne d'Albret. Harvard University Press.
- Romier, Lucien (1913). Les Origines Politiques des Guerres de Religion II: La Fin de la Magnificience Extėrieure le Roi Contre les Protestants (1555-1559). Librairie Académique Perrin et Cie.
- Wood, James (2002). The Kings Army: Warfare, Soldiers and Society during the Wars of Religion in France, 1562-1576. Cambridge University Press.

French nobility
Preceded by René of Savoy	Count of Villars; 1525-1565	Succeeded by Promoted to marquisate
Preceded by New creation	Marquis of Villars; 1565-1580	Succeeded by Henriette of Savoy-Villars
