= Agnel (coin) =

Old French coin

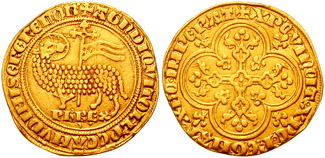
An agnel of Philip the Fair

An agnel, aignel, agnel d'or or mouton d’or (English lamb, gold lamb, gold sheep) was a French gold coin, introduced by Louis IX of France through an ordinance on 24 November 1226. However, the first known examples were struck under Philip the Fair from 26 January 1311 onwards.

Agnels were minted in nearby states as well. John III, Duke of Brabant was the first outside of France to mint the coin. After his death his eldest daughter Joanna, Duchess of Brabant continued the minting with her husband Wenceslaus I, Duke of Luxembourg. Other copies of the agnel were minted in the County of Holland, Duchy of Guelders, Prince-Bishopric of Liège and the County of Ligny.

The obverse of the coin showed the Paschal Lamb or Agnus Dei, which gave the coin its name. The reverse showed a Gothic cross. The last agnels were struck under Charles VII of France in the 15th century.

== Sources ==
- http://gallica.bnf.fr/ark:/12148/btv1b7700432x
