= Anthony I, Count of Ligny =

French nobleman (1450–1519)

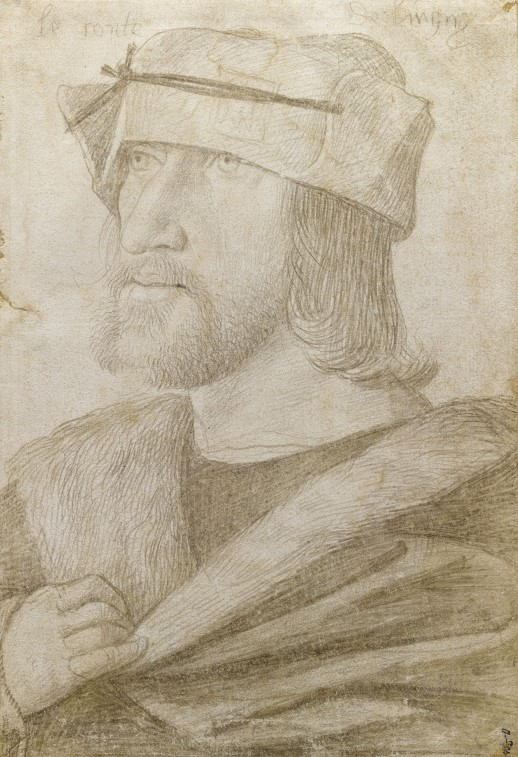
- Portrait by Jean Perréal, c. 1493
- Born: 1450
- Died: 1519 (aged 68–69)
- Noble family: House of Luxemburg
- Spouses: Antoinette of Bauffremont; Françoise of Croÿ-Chimay; Gilette de Coétivy
- Issue Detail: Philiberta; Charles I, Count of Ligny
- Father: Louis de Luxembourg, Count of Saint-Pol
- Mother: Jeanne de Bar, Countess of Marle and Soissons

Anthony I, Count of Ligny (1450–1519) was the youngest son of Louis de Luxembourg, Count of Saint-Pol and his wife, Jeanne de Bar, Countess of Marle and Soissons. In 1482, he inherited the County of Brienne from his brother Peter II, Count of Saint-Pol. After the death of Charles of Bourbon in 1510, Anthony inherited the County of Ligny, which thereby fell back to the House of Luxembourg.

== Marriage and issue ==
His name originates from the fact that he was an 8th generation descendant of Henry V, Count of Luxembourg, and thus belonged to the French branch of the House of Luxembourg.

He married three times:

- Antoinette (d. 1490), the daughter of Peter of Bauffremont and mother of:
  - Philiberta, married in 1495 to John IV of Chalon-Arlay, Prince of Orange
- Françoise of Croÿ-Chimay, the daughter of Philip I of Croÿ-Chimay and mother of:
  - Charles (1488–1530), his successor as Count of Ligny.

By his mistress, Peronne de Machefert, he had an illegitimate son, Antoine of Luxembourg, Bastard of Brienne (1480–1538), who married and had issue (last male descendant John III of Chapelle died in 1670).

Anthony I, Count of Ligny House of Luxembourg Born: 1450 Died: 1519
| Preceded by Charles as Charles of Bourbon | Count of Ligny; 1482–1519 | Succeeded by Charles I as Charles of Luxembourg-Ligny |
