= René of Savoy =

French nobleman and soldier

René of Savoy (1473 – 31 March 1525) was a French nobleman and soldier. He was count of Villars (1497) and of Tende (1501). Known as "the Great Bastard of Savoy", he was the illegitimate son of Philip II, Duke of Savoy and Libera Portoneri - this made him the originator of the Savoie-Villars (or Savoie-Tende) branch of the House of Savoy.

== Biography ==
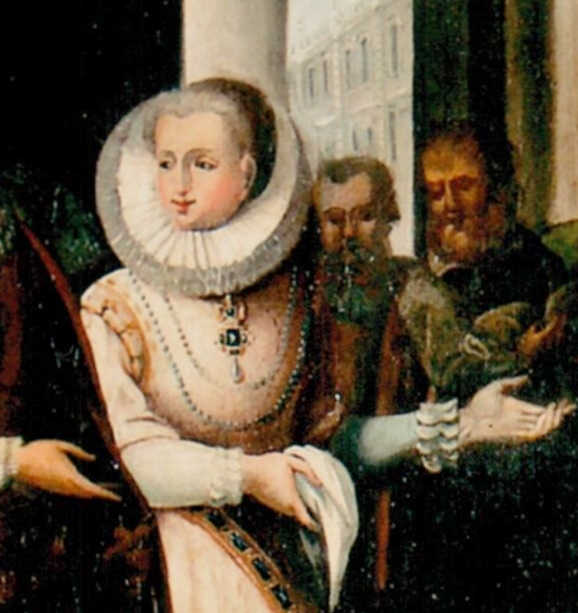
Anne Lascaris

He was legitimated in 1499, by his half-brother Philibert II. He was the second husband of Anne Lascaris - a daughter of the count of Tende, she was countess of Tende, marquise of Marro, lady of Prela, of Villeneuve and of Menton. René and Lascaris married on 28 January 1501 at Tende, during René's governorship of Nice. The count of Tende gave most of his lands with his daughter as her dowry and the marriage contract required that René take the name and coat of arms of the counts of Tende.

In 1501 Philibert II remarried, to Margaret of Austria, who hated René and had her father Maximilian I revoke René's legitimation in 1502. An increasing influence on her husband, Margaret brought René to trial and in 1503 got Philibert to revoke his act legitimating René, thus losing him his fiefdoms in the Piedmont and leaving him only with those in Tende, held through his wife. On Anne's father's death in 1509, Anne Lascaris and René received homage from their vassals in the Tende and from the vassals of all their fiefdoms in Provence and Genoa. René took refuge in France and paid homage to Louis XII of France in 1510 in return for keeping Tende.

Philibert died suddenly in 1504 and René faced opposition from the Holy Roman Emperor when he tried to succeed to Philibert's duchy of Savoy - his half brother Charles III became duke instead. As half-brother of Louise of Savoy, René was uncle to Francis, Count of Angoulême. When Francis acceded to the French throne as Francis I, René was made governor of Provence and grand sénéchal of Provence in 1515, then Grand Master of France (surintendant of the Maison du Roi) by letters patent of 31 October 1519, posts he held until his death. 1519 also saw René finally regain the duchy of Savoy. On 2 January 1562 Emmanuel Philibert declared by letters patent that Claude of Savoy was count of Tende and that his descendants could succeed to Savoy if the direct line died out.

Around 1519-1520, René built a grand nef called the Sainte Marie de Bonaventure, nicknamed "La Grande Maîtresse", which served as his flagship. This ship left Marseille on 24 August 1520 to protect the Knights Hospitaller against an attack by the Turks, returning there on 6 January 1521. During this expedition, admiral Christophe de Chanoy was killed at Beirut. In May 1522, the ship took part in the expedition to aid Genoa, commanded by René as admiral and by Pedro of Navarre as lieutenant general. The ship took part in the defence and resupply of Marseille during the city's siege by the constable de Bourbon in 1524. René rented the ship to his nephew France I for 1500 écus per month between 28 June 1524 and 30 April 1525.

He died at Pavia on 31 March 1525, seven days after sustaining serious injuries during the Battle of Pavia. After René's death, Louise of Savoy put a value-estimate on the ship and it was bought by Francis I from the countess of Villars and Tende between July and August 1526.

== Marriage and issue ==
On 28 January 1501, he married Anne Lascaris, countess of Tende (1487–1554), daughter and heiress of Jean-Antoine Lascaris, Count of Tende and Ventimiglia, dame of Chateau Montfort in La Colle sur Loup, and of Isabelle d'Anglure, widow of Louis de Clermont-Lodève, with whom he had the following children:

- Claude de Savoie
- Madeleine (c. 1510 - c. 1586), married the Constable of France, Anne de Montmorency (1492 † 1567)
- Marguerite (died 15 July 1591), married Antoine of Luxembourg, count de Brienne;
- Honorat II of Savoy
- Isabelle, in 1527 married René de Batarnay, count de Bouchage

== Sources ==
- Cholakian, Patricia Francis; Cholakian, Rouben Charles (2006). Marguerite de Navarre. Columbia University Press.
- Coolidge, W. A. B. (1916). "The History of the Col de Tenda". The English Historical Review. 31 (122 (Apr)). Oxford University Press: 193–223.
- Vester, Matthew Allen (2012). Renaissance dynasticism and apanage politics : Jacques de Savoie-Nemours, 1531-1585. Truman State University Press.

Preceded by Antoine of Lévis	Count of Villars; 1497–1525	Succeeded by Honorat II of Savoy
Preceded by Artus Gouffier de Boissy	Grand Master of France; 1519–1525	Succeeded by Anne de Montmorency
