= Charles II de Luxembourg =

- Count of Brienne
- Brienne's coat of arms
- Born: c. 1558
- Died: c. 1608
- Spouse: Anne-Marie de La Valette
- House: House of Luxembourg
- Father: John III, Count of Ligny

Charles II de Luxembourg, Count of Brienne (c. 1558–c. 1608) was a French noble, prince étranger and military commander during the latter French Wars of Religion. The son of John III, Count of Ligny, he inherited the valuable county on his father's death in 1576. In 1583, he married a sister of Épernon, tying their two families together. Thereafter he became a client of the Épernon, and was desired by the duke to serve as Governor of Metz. He was created Duke of Brienne in 1587, extinct on his death.

In early 1589, with his patron in internal exile, he represented his interests in Touraine. With Jean VI d'Aumont he was involved in the royalist recapture of Angoulême. On 28 April, his position was betrayed and his small scouting force was attacked by troops under the Catholic ligue lieutenant-general Charles de Lorraine, duc de Mayenne, in the ensuing combat Brienne was captured, and sent back to Paris as a valuable prisoner. Imprisoned in the Louvre, he was approached by Jacques Clément a Dominican Friar who pretended to be a royalist that desired to cross the siege lines to the king Henri. Brienne produced a passport for him, and Clément travelled to the king. Having achieved an audience with him, Clément stabbed the king in the stomach, Henri died the following day.

== Early life and family ==
Charles II de Luxembourg was born in 1558, the son of Jean III de Luxembourg. Jean was a chevalier de l'Ordre du Saint-Esprit and commanded 50 lances. He had died in 1576, and Charles inherited the county of Brienne.

By the 1580s, two favourites had emerged as premier among Henri's considerations, Joyeuse and Épernon. To secure their positions at court, Henri sought to marry them into prestigious and ancient families. It was decided that Épernon's youngest sister, Anne-Marie de La Valette would marry Brienne. The wedding took place in Paris in February 1583, with a wedding feast celebrated with the king at the Louvre. Anne-Marie was around 23 years old. Brienne was a wealthy county, with an income of 20,000 livres, and as such the king had to forward a dowry for Anne-Marie of 150,000 livres.

Épernon himself would arrange for his marriage on 22 August 1587 to Marguerite de Foix-Candale, the Foix-Candale being one of the most powerful families in the south west. As a brother in law of the duke, Brienne served as one of his witnesses for the signing of the marriage contract.

== Reign of Henri III ==
By 1588, with Joyeuse dead, Épernons ascendency at court became entirely intolerable to the Guise and their ligueur allies. After the Day of the Barricades, Henri was forced to concede to relieving Épernon of his charges. He agreed to resign his military commissions, and many of his governorships, on the condition they are not given to the Guise. To this end he proposed his governorship of Metz be restored to his client, Brienne.

=== War with the ligue ===
Under the command of Jean VI d'Aumont Brienne participated in the re-capture of the ligueur held city of Angers in early 1589. At this time, Épernon was in internal exile, down south in Angoulême and Brienne represented his patrons interests in the Touraine.

On 28 April 1589, Brienne was leading a small reconnaissance party at the Château de Saint-Ouen near Amboise when he ran into forces under Charles, Duke of Mayenne. In the skirmish that followed his small party was able to kill 50 ligueurs, but in the chaos he was captured by the ligue army, and he was quickly moved back to Paris as a captive. The ligueur army had learned of his parties position due to information delivered to them by Épinac, the archbishop of Lyon. Épinac had been a prisoner of the king, but his captor De Gast, an enemy of Épernon and his clique, allowed his escape.

=== Assassination ===
Jacques Clément, a Dominican friar made the fateful decision, with Paris surrounded by the royal siege, to kill the king. To reach the king he would first need to pass the ring of siege lines around Paris. He paid a visit to the Louvre where Brienne was held captive. He explained to Brienne that he was a committed royalist, and he wanted to be able to join the king on the siege lines. Brienne was convinced of his sincerity. The imprisoned Brienne provided him the necessary passport he needed to be allowed across the lines to the royalist camp.

Having deceived his way into Henri's presence, Clément handed him his letter from Brienne. He informed Henri that alongside providing this letter he had been entrusted with relaying a secret from the captive Brienne to him. Henri told his guards to leave, and began to read the letter Clément had handed him. As he read Clément pulled a knife from up his sleeve and stabbed Henri in the abdomen. Henri died the following day.

== Sources ==
- Chevallier, Pierre (1985). Henri III: Roi Shakespearien. Fayard.
- Constant, Jean-Marie (1996). La Ligue. Fayard.
- Knecht, Robert (2010). The French Wars of Religion, 1559-1598. Routledge.
- Knecht, Robert (2016). Hero or Tyrant? Henry III, King of France, 1574-1589. Routledge.
- Le Roux, Nicolas (2000). La Faveur du Roi: Mignons et Courtisans au Temps des Derniers Valois. Champ Vallon.
- Le Roux, Nicolas (2006). Un Régicide au nom de Dieu: L'Assassinat d'Henri III. Gallimard.
