= John III, Count of Ligny =

- Died: 1 July 1576
- Noble family: House of Luxembourg
- Spouse: Wilhelmina of Bouillon
- Issue Detail: Charles II de Luxembourg
- Father: Anthony II, Count of Ligny
- Mother: Margaret of Savoy

John III, Count of Ligny (died 1 July 1576) was the eldest son of Count Anthony II and his wife Margaret of Savoy. He succeeded his father as Count of Brienne and Ligny in 1557.

He arrived in Edinburgh on 2 November 1566 as the ambassador of Savoy and was lodged in Henry Kinloch's house in the Canongate near Holyrood Palace. He visited Craigmillar Castle to meet Mary, Queen of Scots on 20 November, and went to Stirling Castle on 12 December for the baptism of Prince James, escorted by George Seton, 7th Lord Seton. He gave the queen a necklace of pearl and rubies and earrings.

== Marriage and family ==
John married Wilhelmina (d. 1592), the daughter of Duke Robert IV of Bouillon. Together, they had the following children:

- Anthony
- Charles II (1558–1608), his successor, elevated to Duke of Brienne in 1587
- Margaret (1562–1566)
- François
- Diana (d. 1624), married:
  1. Louis of Plusquelec, Count of Kerman
  2. Justus of Pontaillier, Baron of Pleurs
- Louise (1567–1647), married:
  1. George of Amboise, Baron of Casaubon
  2. Bernard of Béon, Seigneur de Massez

John III, Count of Ligny House of Luxembourg Died: 1 July 1576
Preceded by Anthony II	Count of Ligny; Count of Brienne; 1557-1576	Succeeded by Charles II
