= Waleran I of Ligny =

Waleran I, Lord of Ligny
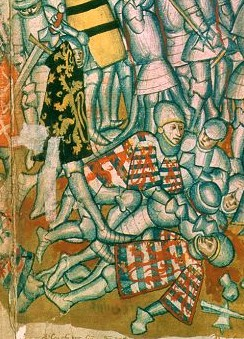
- Battle of Worringen

Lord of Ligny and La Roche
- Reign: 1281–1288
- Predecessor: Henry I
- Successor: Henry II
- Died: 5 June 1288
- Spouse: Jeanne of Beaurevoir
- Issue: Henry II of Luxembourg, Lord of Ligny; Waleran II of Luxembourg, Lord of Ligny; Philipotte of Luxembourg; Elisabeth of Luxembourg; Marguerite of Luxembourg; Marie of Luxembourg
- House: Luxembourg
- Father: Henry V of Luxembourg-Ligny
- Mother: Margaret of Bar

Waleran I of Luxembourg (died 5 June 1288 in the Battle of Worringen) was Lord of Ligny and La Roche around 1281.

Waleran was the second son of Henry V, Count of Luxembourg and Margaret of Bar. While his older brother Henry VI became Count of Luxembourg like their father, Waleran was the forefather and founder of what became the French branch of the House of Luxembourg, the so-called house of Luxembourg-Ligny.

Waleran married Jeanne, Dame de Beaurevoir, and had:

- Henry II, died 1304, 1295 Lord of Ligny
- Waleran II (1275–1354) Lord of Ligny, Roussy and Beauvoir, married Guyotte Châtelaine de Lille († 1338)
- Philipotte
- Elisabeth
- Marguerite, nun
- Marie (died 1337), married Jean de Ghistelles (killed in 1346 in the Battle of Crécy)

Waleran was killed together with his brother Henry VI, Count of Luxembourg in the Battle of Worringen against John I, Duke of Brabant. His eldest son, Henry II of Ligny, succeeded him.

Waleran of Luxembourg is one of the protagonists in Le Tournoi de Chauvency by trouvère Jacques Bretel.

== Sources ==
- Hoensch, Jorg K. (2000). Die Luxemburger: Ein spatmittelalterliche Dynastie gesamteuropaischer Bedeutung, 1308-1437 (in German). Verlag W. Kohlhammer. ISBN 3-17-015159-2.
- Monnet, Pierre (2020). Charles IV: Un empereur en Europe (in French). Fayard. ISBN 9782213699523.

Preceded by Henry I	Count of Ligny; 1281–1288	Succeeded by Henry II
