= Ligny-en-Barrois =

- Commune
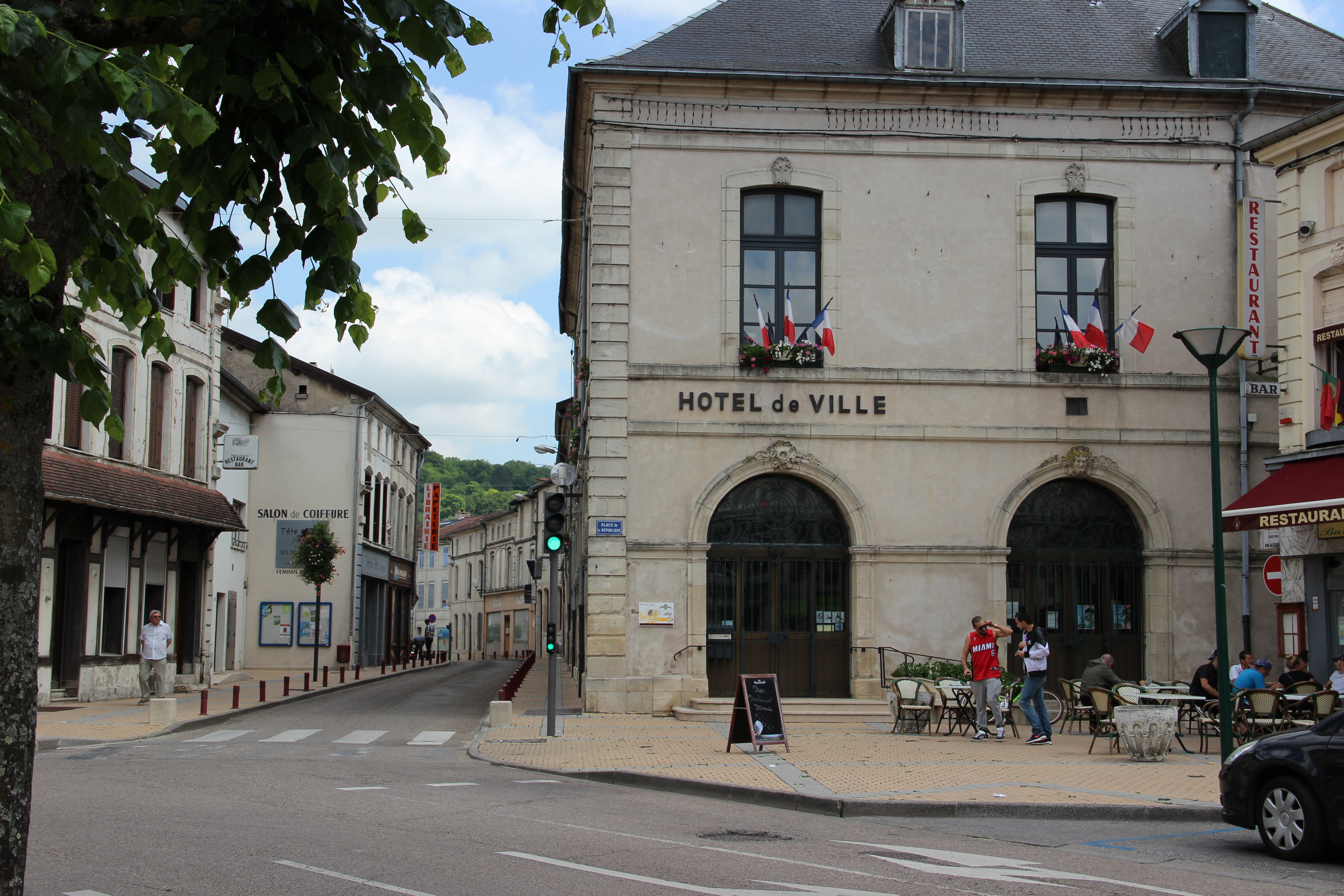
- The town hall in Ligny-en-Barrois

- Coat of arms
- Location of Ligny-en-Barrois
- Location within France Location within Grand Est
- Coordinates: 48°41′23″N 5°19′30″E
- Country: France
- Region: Grand Est
- Department: Meuse
- Arrondissement: Bar-le-Duc
- Canton: Ligny-en-Barrois
- Intercommunality: CA Bar-le-Duc - Sud Meuse

Government
  - Mayor (2020–2026): Jean-Michel Guyot
- Area^{1}: 32.26 km^{2} (12.46 sq mi)
- Elevation: 225 m (738 ft)
- Population (2023): 3,677
  - Density: 114.0/km^{2} (295.2/sq mi)
- Time zone: UTC+01:00 (CET)
  - Summer (DST): UTC+02:00 (CEST)
- INSEE/Postal code: 55291 /55500
- ^{1} French Land Register data, which excludes lakes, ponds, glaciers > 1 km^{2} (0.386 sq mi or 247 acres) and river estuaries.

Ligny-en-Barrois (French pronunciation: [liɲi ɑ̃ baʁwa], lit. 'Ligny in Barrois') is a commune in the Meuse department in Grand Est in north-eastern France.

The town is in the arrondissement of Bar-le-Duc, beside the canal that links the rivers Rhine and Marne, fifteen kilometres to the south east of Bar-le-Duc: it is the administrative seat of the canton of Ligny-en-Barrois. The area of Ligny-en-Barrois is 32.26 km^{2}.

A principal employer is the French Evobus motor bus assembly plant. Ligny is also the home town of the Essilor company which specialises in ophthalmic lens production.

The commune is listed as a Village étape.

== Population ==
Historical population
Year	Pop.	±% p.a.
1968	5,861	—
1975	6,143	+0.67%
1982	5,591	−1.34%
1990	5,342	−0.57%
1999	5,035	−0.66%
2007	4,564	−1.22%
2012	4,170	−1.79%
2017	4,052	−0.57%
2023	3,677	−1.61%
Source: INSEE

The inhabitants are called Linéens in French.

== Twin towns – sister cities ==
Ligny-en-Barrois is twinned with:

- Aichtal, Germany (1998)

== See also ==
- Communes of the Meuse department
