= John II of Ligny =

French nobleman (1392–1441)

John II of Luxembourg
- Count of Ligny, Count of Guise, Lord of Beauvoir and Richebourg
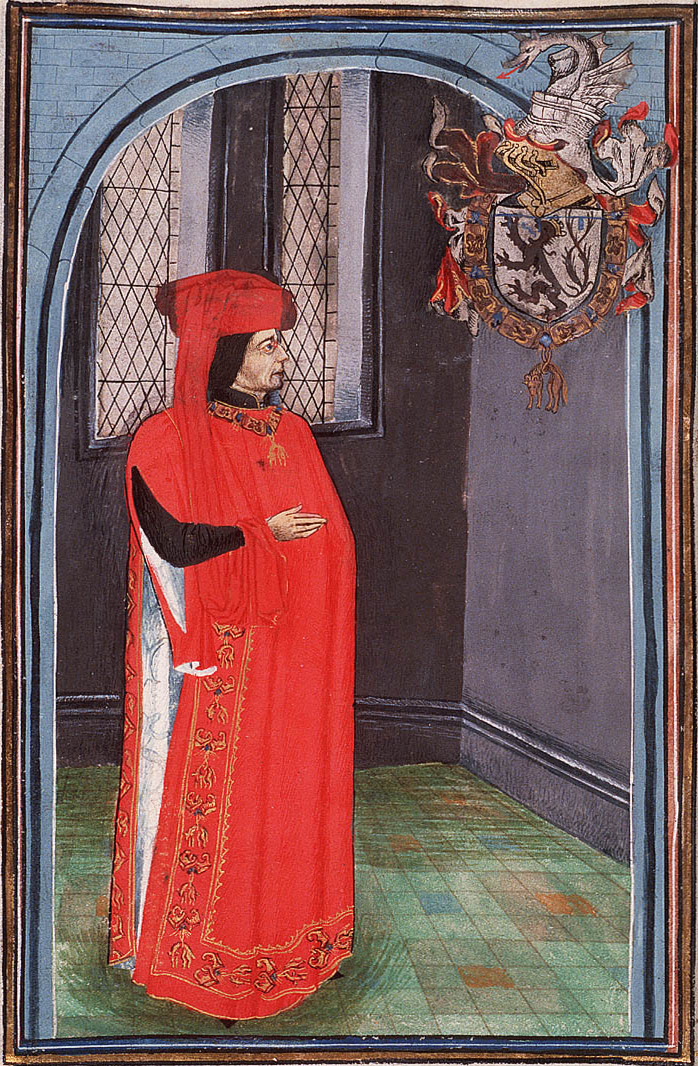
- Predecessor: Joan
- Successor: Louis, Count of Saint-Pol
- Born: 1392
- Died: 5 January 1441 (aged 48–49); Guise, France
- Buried: Cambrai Cathedral
- Family: House of Luxembourg
- Spouse: Joan of Béthune (m. 1418)
- Father: John of Luxembourg I
- Mother: Margaret of Brienne

John II of Luxembourg, Count of Ligny (1392 – 5 January 1441) was a French nobleman and soldier, a younger son of John of Luxembourg, Lord of Beauvoir, and Marguerite of Enghien. His older brother Peter received his mother's fiefs, including the County of Brienne, while John received Beaurevoir. He married Jeanne de Béthune, Viscountess of Meaux, widow of Robert of Bar, on 23 November 1418, and became step-father to Jeanne de Bar, Countess of Marle and Soissons. He and Jeanne de Béthune had no children.

== Career ==
His name originates from the fact that he was a 6th generation descendant of Henry V, Count of Luxembourg, and thus belonged to the French branch of the House of Luxembourg.

His career began in the service of John the Fearless, the Duke of Burgundy, during the Armagnac-Burgundian Civil War in France. John II of Luxembourg was appointed governor of Arras in 1414, and conducted several raids into nearby Armagnac outposts. In April 1418, at the command of a Burgundian force, he relieved the besieged city of Senlis from the Armagnacs. After Paris was seized by the Burgundians in May of the same year, John II became governor of Paris, serving from 1418 to 1420.

He took the side of the English during the Hundred Years' War, and carried out a number of chevauchées on behalf of the Regent Bedford. John II and his family were steadfast supporters of the English cause among the French nobility, and his brother Louis (1391–1443), the bishop of Thérouanne, became chancellor of France for the Duke of Bedford.

In 1425, he seized the seigneurie of Guise, which he had disputed with René of Anjou. Guise, at that time the last Armagnac outpost in northern France, was of strategic importance grew due to its position between Burgundy and the Burgundian Netherlands. John II was a descendant of the Châtillon counts of Saint-Pol, who formerly held Guise, and his claim to it was recognized by the Duke of Bedford. Joined by an English force under sir Thomas Rempston, John II put the city under siege, and Guise, along with the fortress of Hirson, formally surrendered to him on 1 March 1425.

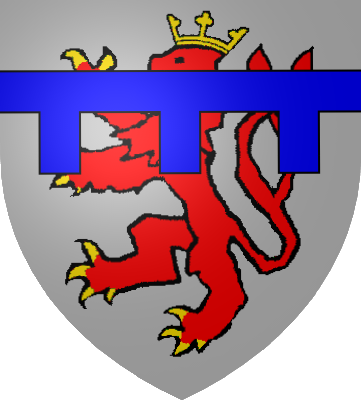
Coat of Arms of John II of Luxembourg

He joined Philip III, Duke of Burgundy, in the Siege of Compiègne in 1430. While the siege was ultimately unsuccessful, a soldier in his company (the Bastard of Vendôme) captured Joan of Arc, whom he sent to Beauvoir as a prisoner. Shortly thereafter, his aunt Jeanne of Luxembourg, who was then living with him, died and left him the County of Ligny. Under pressure from England and Burgundy, John ultimately sold Joan to the English for 10,000 livres, thus causing her death.

The Count of Ligny continued campaigning in France for the next few years. He made a few incursions in the region around Laon, and from 1433, he campaigned in Picardy, capturing Haplincourt in that year and Saint-Valery in 1434.

During the congress of Arras in 1435, Ligny was one those who urged Philip of Burgundy not to sign a peace treaty with the Armagnacs. Philip did so anyway and concluded the Treaty of Arras with Charles VII of France, which Ligny peremptorily refused to sign. This irritated Charles, who authorised his men to attack his lands. Ligny from then on was forced to deal with écorcheurs ravaging his lands. In 1436, La Hire pillaged Soissons, which belonged to Ligny's daughter-in-law, Jeanne of Bar.

In early 1436, Ligny was asked by Duke Philip III to help reach a peace agreement with the English, through John's older brother Louis of Luxembourg. The English however were furious at Philip's betrayal and war broke out between the former allies. In late 1437, the Duke of Burgundy asked the Count of Ligny for help in raising levies for the Burgundian siege of English-held Le Crotoy. John refused, asserting that he never broke faith with his English allies and would not do so at that moment.

Ligny died on 5 January 1441 at Guise, having never taken the oath to the treaty of Arras. At his death, he left his lands to his nephew Louis. His fiefs were instead confiscated by Charles VII, though they were later restored.

Preceded by John I	Lord of Beauvoir and Richebourg; 1397–1441	Succeeded by Louis I
Preceded by René	Count of Guise; 1425–1441	Succeeded by Louis I
Preceded by Jeanne	Count of Ligny; 1430–1441	Succeeded by Louis I
