= Jacquetta Woodville, Baroness Strange of Knockin =

English noblewoman

Jacquetta Woodville
- Baroness Strange of Knockin
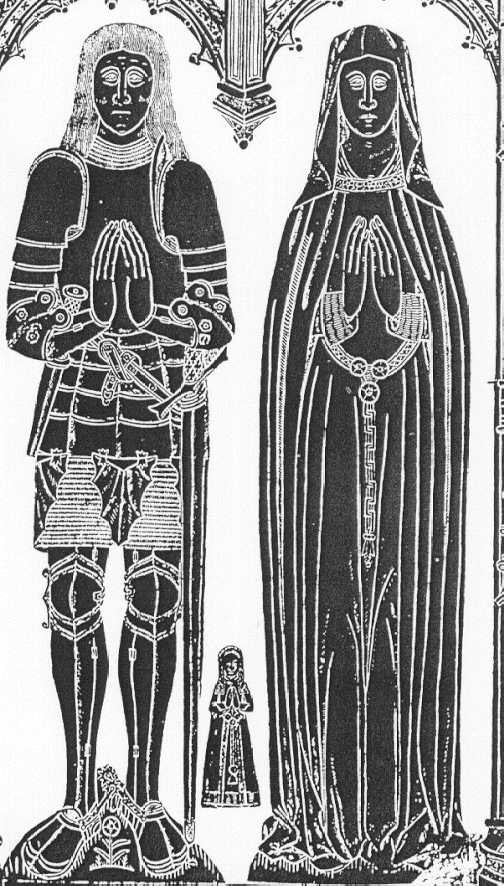
- Memorial brass of John le Strange and Jacquetta with their only child Joan in between.
- Born: about 1446; Grafton Regis, Northamptonshire, England
- Died: bef. 1479 (aged 32–33)
- Noble family: Woodville
- Spouse: John le Strange, 8th Baron Strange
- Issue: Joan le Strange
- Father: Richard Woodville, 1st Earl Rivers
- Mother: Jacquetta of Luxembourg

Jacquetta Woodville, Baroness Strange of Knockin (c. 1446 – before 1479) was an English noblewoman. She was a younger sister of Queen Consort Elizabeth Woodville. Through her marriage to John le Strange, 8th Baron Strange, she became Baroness Strange of Knockin.

== Family ==
According to author Lynda Pidgeon, Jacquetta Woodville was born about 1446, probably at Grafton Regis, Northamptonshire. She was the third daughter and one of the fourteen children of Richard Woodville, 1st Earl Rivers and Jacquetta of Luxembourg. Her eldest sister, Elizabeth Woodville, later became the queen consort of King Edward IV.

Jacquetta's paternal grandparents were Sir Richard Wydeville and Joan Bedlisgate, while her maternal grandparents were Peter I of Luxembourg, Count of Saint-Pol, Conversano, and Brienne, and Margaret de Baux.

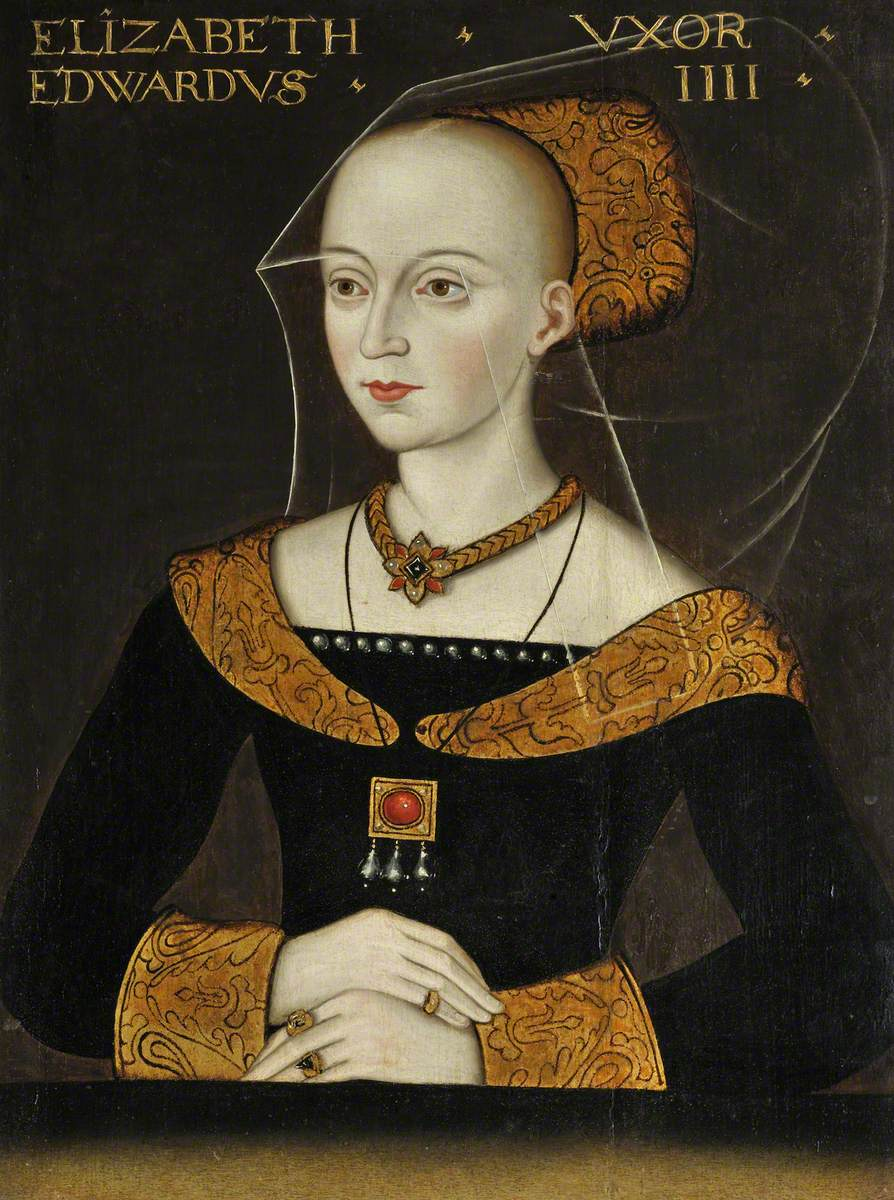
Queen consort Elizabeth Woodville, the eldest sister of Jacquetta Woodville.

== Marriage and issue ==
Jacquetta was the first of her siblings to marry. Despite the Woodvilles' comparatively modest gentry origins, she married John le Strange, 8th Baron Strange (1444–1479), son Richard le Strange and Elizabeth Cobham. His mother was a sister of Eleanor, Duchess of Gloucester. His family was of influential nobility. At that time, they were experiencing financial difficulties owing to two successive generations of minor heirs. Both John's father and grandfather appear to have depended on unscrupulous custodians. Pidgeon suggests that John's mother may have hoped Richard Woodville would help protect her son's estates during his minority. It is also possible that the marriage contract had been arranged by their fathers, Richard Woodville and Richard le Strange, before the latter's death, and that John's mother wished to honour the agreement. Whatever the reason, there is little evidence that the young couple received assistance from either the Woodville family or Edward IV following his marriage to Jacquetta's sister.

The marriage took place on or before 27 March 1450, according to the Calendar of the Patent Rolls, in which they are mentioned as husband and wife. Jacquetta was about four years old, while John was about six.

Jacquetta and John had one child:

- Joan le Strange (c. 1463 – 20 March 1514), who married George Stanley, 9th Baron Strange of Knockin and had issue.

== Downfall of the Woodvilles ==
In 1483, the fortunes of the Woodville family declined following the death of King Edward IV in April. Jacquetta's sister Elizabeth, as the mother of the young King Edward V, became queen mother. However, in June 1483, her marriage to the late king was declared invalid on the grounds that Edward had allegedly been precontracted to Lady Eleanor Talbot. Edward IV's younger brother, Richard, Duke of Gloucester, then serving as Lord Protector, claimed the throne for himself on 22 June. His claim was supported by an Act of Parliament known as Titulus Regius, which declared Edward V and his siblings illegitimate.

Elizabeth, now styled Dame Grey, sought sanctuary with her daughters, while her two sons, the "Princes in the Tower", were confined in the Tower of London on the orders of Richard III. On 25 June 1483, Richard also ordered the executions of Jacquetta and Elizabeth's brother Anthony Woodville, Earl Rivers and Richard Grey, Elizabeth's younger son by her first marriage to Sir John Grey of Groby.

== Death ==
Jacquetta's exact date of death is unknown, and different authors have proposed different dates. Cokayne and Richardson state that the Baroness Strange of Knockin died before 13 October 1479, at about thirty-three years of age. Since her husband died on 13 October 1479 and had married twice, they conclude that Jacquetta, his first wife, must have died before his second marriage and therefore before his death.

Lynda Pidgeon, although also uncertain of Jacquetta's date of death, notes that she appears to have been present at several family events during the 1480s. Pidgeon concludes that she died before 4 August 1492, when the surviving Woodville sisters were named as heirs in the inquisition post mortem of their brother Richard and Jacquetta was not included among them. Likewise, on 24 September 1485, the surviving Woodville sisters were named in a grant to Edward Woodville, but Jacquetta was again omitted, suggesting that she had died by that date.

After Jacquetta's death, her widowed husband married Anne Neville, a daughter of Edward Neville, 3rd Baron Bergavenny, by his second wife, Katherine Howard.

Jacquetta was buried in St John's Church, Hillingdon, Middlesex, beneath a brass memorial commemorating both her and her husband, John le Strange.

== Ancestry ==
Ancestors of Jacquetta Woodville, Baroness Strange of Knockin

8. John Woodville
4. Richard Woodville
9. Isabel Godard
2. Richard Woodville, 1st Earl Rivers
10. Thomas Bedlisgate
5. Joan Bedlisgate
11. Joan Beauchamp
1. Anne Woodville
24.Guy I, Count of Ligny
12. John, Lord of Beauvoir
25. Mathilde of Châtillon
6. Peter I, Count of Saint-Pol
26. Louis, Count of Enghien
13. Margaret, Countess of Brienne
27. Giovanna Sanseverino
3. Jacquetta of Luxembourg
28. Bertrand III, Lord of Baux
14. Francis of Baux
29. Marguerite of Aulnay
7. Margaret of Baux
30. Nicola Orsini, Count of Nola
15. Sueva Orsini
31. Jeanne de Sabran

== Sources ==
- Pidgeon, Lynda (June 2017). "A Strange Marriage: Jacquetta Wydevile and John Lord Strange". The Ricardian. 27.
- Richardson, Douglas (2011). Plantagenet Ancestry: A Study in Colonial and Medieval Families (2nd ed.). Douglas Richardson. p. 303.
- Great Britain (1891). Calendar of the Patent Rolls Preserved in the Public Record Office: Henry VI, 1446–1452. Vol. 5. London: H.M. Stationery Office. p. 311.
- Pidgeon, Lynda (June 2017). "A Strange Marriage: Jacquetta Wydevile and John Lord Strange". The Ricardian. 27: 132–140.
- Pidgeon, Lynda (June 2017). "A Strange Marriage: Jacquetta Wydevile and John Lord Strange". The Ricardian. 27: 141.
- Cokayne, George Edward. The Complete Peerage; or, A History of the House of Lords and All Its Members from the Earliest Times. Vol. 12. St Catherine Press.
- Macklin, Herbert Walter (1913). The Brasses of England. London: Methuen. p. 223.
- Richardson, Douglas (2011). Plantagenet Ancestry: A Study in Colonial and Medieval Families (2nd ed.). Douglas Richardson. p. 303.
- Cokayne, George Edward. The Complete Peerage; or, A History of the House of Lords and All Its Members from the Earliest Times. Vol. 12. St Catherine Press.
- Pidgeon, Lynda (June 2017). "A Strange Marriage: Jacquetta Wydevile and John Lord Strange". The Ricardian. 27: 144.
- Campbell, William (1873). Materials for a History of the Reign of Henry VII: From Original Documents Preserved in the Public Record Office. p. 562.
