= Margaret of Baux =

Italian noblewoman

- Countess of Brienne, of Conversano, and of Saint-Pol
- Coat of arms
- Born: 1394
- Died: 15 November 1469 (aged 74–75)
- Noble family: House of Baux (by birth)
- Spouse: Peter of Luxembourg
- Issue: Louis de Luxembourg, Count of Saint-Pol; Jacquetta of Luxembourg; Thibaud of Luxembourg; Jacques of Luxembourg; Valeran of Luxembourg; Jean of Luxembourg; Catherine of Luxembourg; Isabelle of Luxembourg; Philippa of Luxembourg
- Father: Francis of Baux
- Mother: Sueva Orsini

Margaret of Baux (French: Marguerite des Baux, Italian: Margherita del Balzo; 1394 – 15 November 1469) was a Countess of Saint-Pol, of Brienne, and of Conversano. She was a member of the noble House of Baux of the Kingdom of Naples, which had its origins in Provence dating back to the 11th century. Her husband was Peter of Luxembourg, Count of Saint-Pol, of Brienne, and of Conversano (1390 – 31 August 1433).

== Family ==
Margaret was born in 1394, the daughter of Francis of Baux and his third wife Sueva Orsini. She was a descendant of Simon de Montfort, 6th Earl of Leicester and Eleanor of England (daughter of King John of England and Isabella of Angouleme, through their fourth son Guy de Montfort and his eldest daughter Anastasia de Montfort. Her paternal grandparents were Bertrand III of Baux, Count of Andria and Squillace, and Marguerite d'Aulnay, and her maternal grandparents were Nicola Orsini, Count of Nola, Senator of Rome (27 August 1331 – 14 February 1399), and Jeanne de Sabran (1296 - 1375).

== Marriage and issue ==
On 8 May 1405, Margaret married Peter of Luxembourg, Count of Saint-Pol, of Brienne, and of Conversano (1390 – 31 August 1433), the eldest son of John of Luxembourg, Lord of Beauvoir and Marguerite of Enghien, Countess of Brienne and of Conversano, Heiress of Enghien. Peter inherited his mother's fiefs, which included the counties of Brienne and Conversano. He succeeded his aunt Jeanne of Luxembourg, Countess of Saint-Pol and Ligny, as Count of Saint-Pol in 1430. His younger brother John II of Luxembourg, Count of Ligny, an ally of the English during the Hundred Years War, received Joan of Arc as his prisoner, and subsequently sold her to the English, for 10,000 livres.

Peter and Margaret had:

- Louis of Luxembourg, Count of Saint-Pol, de Brienne, de Ligny, and Conversano, Constable of France (1418 – 19 December 1475), married firstly, in 1435, Jeanne de Bar, Countess of Marle and Soissons (1415 – 14 May 1462). He married secondly, Marie of Savoy (20 March 1448 – 1475), by whom he had issue. He was beheaded in Paris in 1475 for treason against King Louis XI.
- Jacquetta of Luxembourg (1415/1416 – 30 May 1472), married firstly in 1433, John, Duke of Bedford, and secondly, in secret, c. 1436, Richard Woodville, 1st Earl Rivers
- Thibaud of Luxembourg, Seigneur de Fiennes, Count of Brienne, Bishop of Le Mans, (died 1 September 1477), married Philippa de Melun, by whom he had issue.
- Jacques of Luxembourg, Seigneur de Richebourg (died 1487), married Isabelle de Roubaix, by whom he had issue.
- Valeran of Luxembourg, died young.
- Jean of Luxembourg, died in Africa.
- Catherine of Luxembourg (died 1492), married Arthur III, Duke of Brittany (24 August 1393 – 26 December 1458)
- Isabelle of Luxembourg, Countess of Guise (died 1472), married in 1443, Charles, Count of Maine (1414–1472).
- Philippa of Luxembourg, Abbess of Saint-Maixent.

Margaret died on 15 November 1469 at the age of 75 and was buried in Cercamp Abbey, Frévent, Pas-de-Calais. Her husband Peter had died of plague in August 1433.

== Sources ==
- Baldwin, David (2010). Elizabeth Woodville: Mother of the Princes in the Tower. The History Press.
- Lefèvre, Sylvie (2006). Antoine de la Sale: la fabrique de l'œuvre et de l'écrivain (in French). Librairie Droz.
- Richardson, Douglas (2011). Plantagenet Ancestry: A Study In Colonial And Medieval Families (2nd ed.).
- Russell, Peter Edward (1995). Portugal, Spain, and the African Atlantic, 1343-1490: Chivalry and Crusade from John of Gaunt to Henry the Navigator. Variorum.
