= Countess of Richmond =

Countess of Richmond is a title that was given to the wife of the Earl of Richmond (title now defunct). Women who have held the title include:

== In her own right ==
- Constance, Duchess of Brittany (1161–1201)
- Eleanor, Fair Maid of Brittany (c.1184–1241)
- Alix, Duchess of Brittany (1200–1221)

== By marriage ==
- Bertha, Duchess of Brittany (fl. 1125-55), wife of Alan, 1st Earl of Richmond
- Margaret of Huntingdon, Duchess of Brittany (1145–1201), wife of Conan IV, Duke of Brittany, Earl of Richmond
- Blanche of Navarre, Duchess of Brittany (1226–1283), wife of John I, Duke of Brittany
- Beatrice of England (1242–1275), wife of John II, Duke of Brittany
- Isabella of Castile, Queen of Aragon (1283–1328), second wife of John III
- Joan of Savoy (1310-1344), third wife of John III, Duke of Brittany
- Joan of Valois, Countess of Beaumont (1304–1363), wife of Robert III of Artois
- Blanche of Lancaster (1342–1368), first wife of John of Gaunt
- Constance of Castile, Duchess of Lancaster (1354–1394), second wife of John of Gaunt
- Joan Holland, Duchess of Brittany (1350–1384), second wife of John IV, Duke of Brittany
- Margaret of Nevers (1393–1442), first wife of Arthur III, Duke of Brittany
- Anne of Burgundy (1404-1432), first wife of John of Lancaster, Duke of Bedford.
- Jacquetta of Luxembourg (1415/6-1472), second wife of John, Duke of Bedford.
- Catherine of Luxembourg-Saint-Pol (1445–1458), third wife of Arthur III
- Margaret Beaufort, Countess of Richmond and Derby (1441/3–1509), wife of Edmund Tudor, 1st Earl of Richmond
