= John of Luxembourg (disambiguation) =

John of Luxembourg (1296–1346), also called of Bohemia or the Blind, was Count of Luxembourg, King of Bohemia and titular King of Poland.

John of Luxembourg may also refer to:

- John of Luxembourg, Lord of Beauvoir (c. 1370–1397)
- John II, Count of Ligny (1392–1441)
- John of Luxembourg, Count of Soissons (died 1476)
