= Louis de Luxembourg =

Louis de Luxembourg may refer to:

- Louis II de Luxembourg (died 1443), Archbishop of Rouen and Bishop of Ely
- Louis de Luxembourg, Count of Saint-Pol (1418–1475)
- Louis de Luxembourg (born 1986), third son of Henri, Grand Duke of Luxembourg
