= Jean de Luxembourg =

Jean de Luxembourg or John of Luxembourg may refer to:

- John of Bohemia (1296–1346), King of Bohemia and Count of Luxembourg.
- John I, Lord of Ligny (1313–1364), Count of Ligny
- John of Luxembourg, Lord of Beauvoir (c. 1370 – 1397), Lord of Beauvoir
- John II of Luxembourg, Count of Ligny (1392–1441)
- John of Luxembourg (died 1476), Count of Soissons
- Jean de Luxembourg (1400-1466), Admiral of the Netherlands
- John III, Count of Ligny (died 1576)
- Jean, Grand Duke of Luxembourg (1921–2019)
- Prince Jean of Luxembourg (born 1957)
