= Jacquetta of Luxembourg =

French-English noblewoman (c. 1415–1472)

- Duchess of Bedford; Countess Rivers
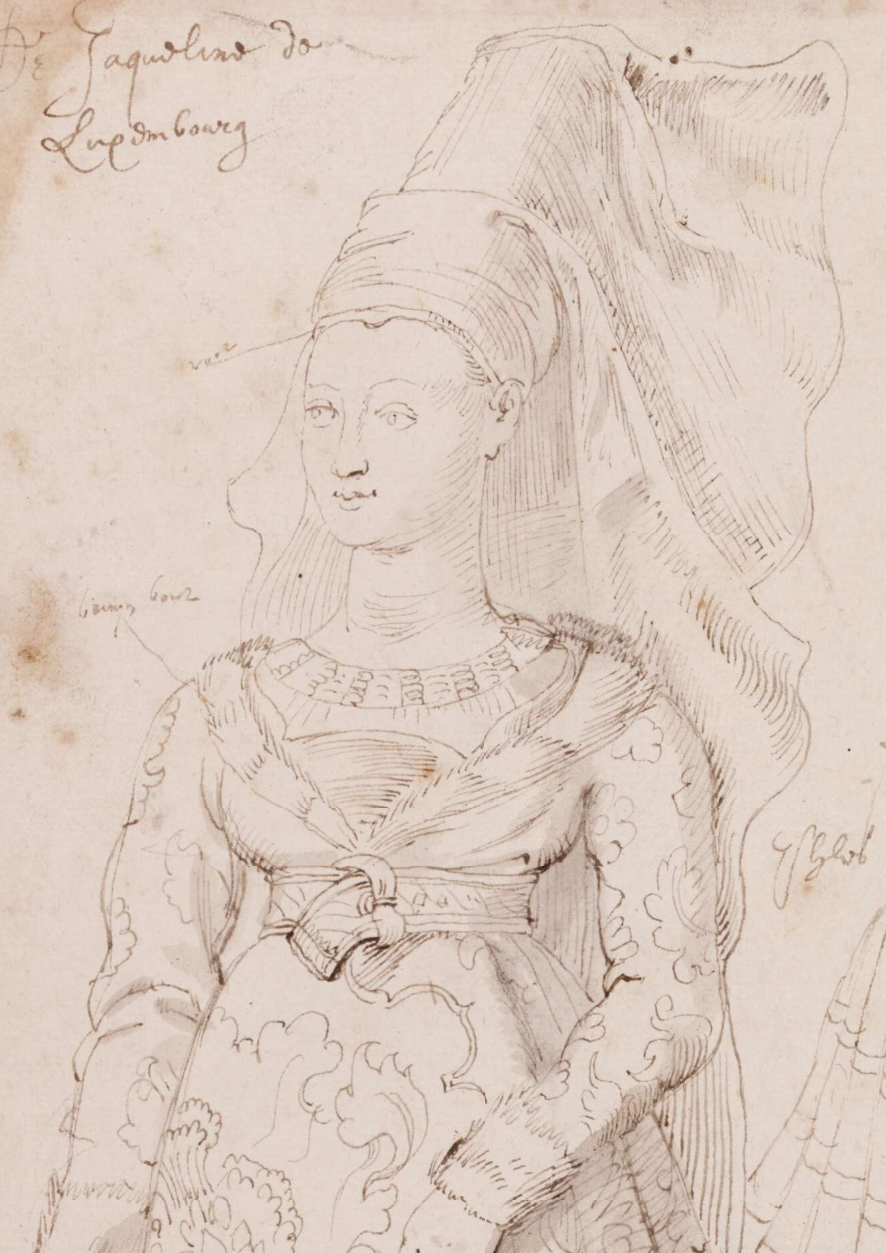
- 17th century sketch by Peter Paul Rubens labeled as Jacquetta (Jacqueline) of Luxembourg
- Born: 1415/1416
- Died: 30 May 1472 (aged 56/57)
- Spouse: John of Lancaster, 1st Duke of Bedford (m. 1433; died 1435) Richard Woodville, 1st Earl Rivers (m. 1437; died 1469)
- Issue: Elizabeth Woodville, Queen of England; Lewis Woodville; Anne Woodville, Viscountess Bourchier; Anthony Woodville, 2nd Earl Rivers; Sir John Woodville; Jacquetta Woodville, Baroness Strange of Knockin; Lionel Woodville, Bishop of Salisbury; Eleanor Woodville, Lady Grey; Margaret Woodville, Countess of Arundel; Martha Bromley; Richard Woodville, 3rd Earl Rivers; Edward Woodville, Lord Scales; Mary Woodville, Countess of Pembroke; Katherine Woodville, Duchess of Buckingham
- House: Luxembourg
- Father: Peter I, Count of Saint-Pol
- Mother: Margaret of Baux

Jacquetta of Luxembourg (1415/1416 – 30 May 1472) was a member of the House of Luxembourg and a prominent figure in the English civil wars known as the Wars of the Roses (1455–1487). Through her short-lived first marriage to John of Lancaster, 1st Duke of Bedford, brother of Henry V of England, she was initially firmly allied to the House of Lancaster. However, following the emphatic Lancastrian defeat at the Battle of Towton, she and her second husband Richard Woodville defected and sided closely with the House of York. Three years after the battle and the accession of Edward IV of England, Jacquetta's eldest daughter Elizabeth Woodville married him and became queen consort of England. Jacquetta bore Woodville 14 children and later stood trial on charges of witchcraft, of which she was exonerated.

== Family and ancestry ==
Jacquetta was the eldest daughter of Peter I of Luxembourg, Count of Saint-Pol, Conversano and Brienne, and his wife Margaret of Baux (Margherita del Balzo of Andria). Her father was also the hereditary Count of Brienne from 1397 until his death in 1433.

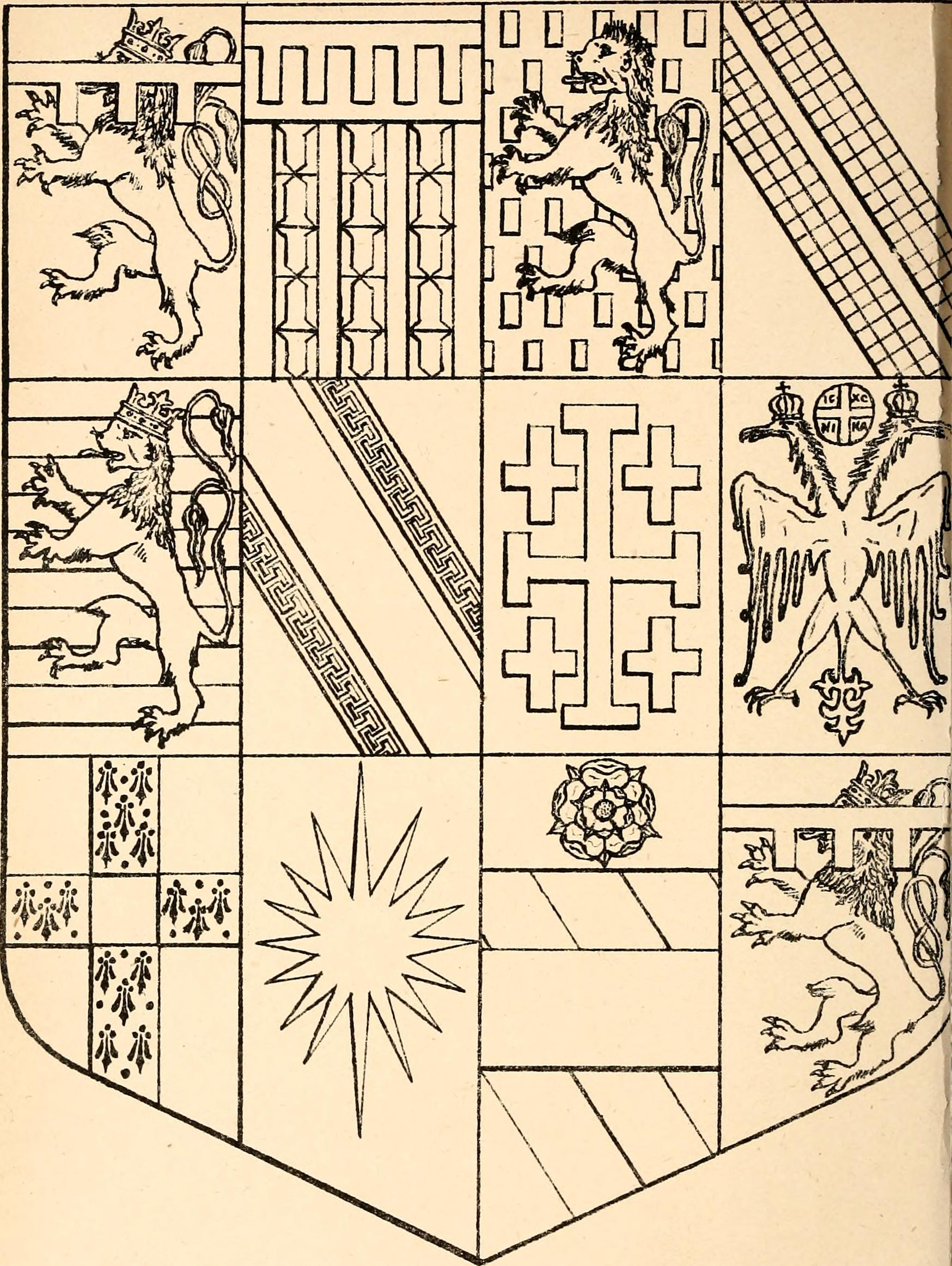
Arms of Jacquetta of Luxembourg

== First marriage ==
On 22 April 1433 at age 17, Jacquetta married John of Lancaster, 1st Duke of Bedford, at Thérouanne. The Duke was the third son of King Henry IV of England and Mary de Bohun, and thus the grandson of John of Gaunt, 1st Duke of Lancaster, himself the third son of King Edward III. The marriage was childless, and the Duke died on 15 September 1435 at Rouen. As was customary at the time, Jacquetta retained the title of her first husband after her second marriage and was always known as the Duchess of Bedford, this being a higher title than that of countess. Jacquetta inherited one-third of the Duke's main estates as her widow's share.

== Second marriage ==
On Jacquetta's journey to England, she was escorted by Sir Richard Woodville, who was commissioned by Henry VI of England. During the journey, Jacquetta and Richard fell in love and married in secret (before 23 March 1437), without seeking the king's permission. Jacquetta had been granted dower lands following her first husband's death on condition that she not remarry without a royal licence. On learning of the marriage, Henry VI refused to see them, but was mollified by the payment of a fine of £1000. The marriage was long and very fruitful: Jacquetta and Richard had fourteen children, including the future Queen consort Elizabeth Woodville. She lost her first-born son Lewis to a fever when he was 12 years old.

By the mid-1440s, the Woodvilles were in a powerful position. Jacquetta was related to both King Henry and Queen Margaret by marriage. Her sister, Isabelle de Saint Pol, married Margaret's uncle Charles du Maine while Jacquetta was the widow of Henry VI's uncle. She outranked all ladies at court with the exception of the queen. As a personal favourite, she also enjoyed special privileges and influence at court. Margaret influenced Henry to create her husband Baron Rivers in 1448, and he was a prominent partisan of the House of Lancaster as the Wars of the Roses began.

== Wars of the Roses ==
Edward IV's victory at Towton in 1461 allowed him to secure the English throne for himself. In 1464 he married Jacquetta's daughter Elizabeth, who then became the Queen of England. The Woodvilles rose to great prominence and power, through Elizabeth's influence. Jacquetta's husband Richard was created Earl Rivers and appointed Lord High Treasurer in March 1466. Jacquetta found rich and influential spouses for her children and helped her grandchildren achieve high posts. She arranged for her 20-year-old son, John, to marry the widowed and very rich Katherine Neville, Duchess of Norfolk, who was at least 45 years older than John. The rise of the Woodvilles created widespread hostility among the Yorkists, including Warwick and the king's brothers George and Richard, who were being displaced in the king's favour by the former Lancastrians.

In 1469, Warwick openly broke with Edward IV and temporarily deposed him. Earl Rivers and his son John were captured and executed by Warwick on 12 August at Kenilworth. Jacquetta survived her husband by three years and died in 1472, at about 56 years of age.

== Witchcraft accusations ==
Shortly after Jacquetta's husband's execution by Warwick in 1469, Thomas Wake, a follower of Warwick, accused her of witchcraft. Wake brought to Warwick Castle a lead figurine "made like a man-of-arms ... broken in the middle and made fast with a wire," and alleged that Jacquetta had fashioned it and two others to represent the king's family to use for witchcraft and sorcery. He claimed that the images had been found by "an honest person", Harry Kyngeston of Stoke Bruerne, Northamptonshire, in his house after the departure of soldiers, who delivered it to the parish clerk John Daunger of Shutlanger (in the parish of Stoke Bruerne). Daunger could allegedly attest that Jacquetta had made the three images. The case fell apart when Warwick released Edward IV from custody, and Jacquetta was cleared by the king's great council of the charges on 21 January 1470. In 1484, Richard III, in the act known as Titulus Regius, revived the allegations of witchcraft against the dead Jacquetta when he claimed that she and Elizabeth had procured Elizabeth's marriage to Edward IV through witchcraft; however, Richard never offered any proof to support his assertions.

== Issue ==
Jacquetta and Richard had:

1. Elizabeth Woodville, Queen consort of England (c. 1437 – 8 June 1492), married first Sir John Grey, second Edward IV of England.
2. Lewis Woodville (c. 1438), died in childhood.
3. Anne Woodville (1438/9 – 30 July 1489), married first William Bourchier, Viscount Bourchier, second George Grey, 2nd Earl of Kent.
4. Anthony Woodville, 2nd Earl Rivers (c. 1440 – 25 June 1483), married first Elizabeth Scales, 8th Baroness Scales, second Mary Fitzlewis; not married to Gwenllian Stradling, the mother of Margaret.
5. John Woodville (c. 1444 – 12 August 1469), married Catherine Neville, Dowager Duchess of Norfolk.
6. Jacquetta Woodville (1445–1509), married John le Strange, 8th Baron Strange of Knockin.
7. Lionel Woodville, Bishop of Salisbury (c. 1446 – June 1484).
8. Eleanor Woodville (d. c. 1512), married Sir Anthony Grey, son of Edmund Grey, 1st Earl of Kent.
9. Margaret Woodville (c. 1450 – 1490/1), married Thomas Fitzalan, 10th Earl of Arundel.
10. Martha Woodville (d. c. 1500), married Sir John Bromley of Baddington.
11. Richard Woodville, 3rd Earl Rivers (1453 – March 1491).
12. Edward Woodville, Lord Scales (1454/8 – 28 July 1488).
13. Mary Woodville (c. 1456 – 1481), married William Herbert, 2nd Earl of Pembroke.
14. Catherine Woodville (c. 1458 – 18 May 1497), married first Henry Stafford, 2nd Duke of Buckingham, second Jasper Tudor, Duke of Bedford, and third Sir Richard Wingfield.

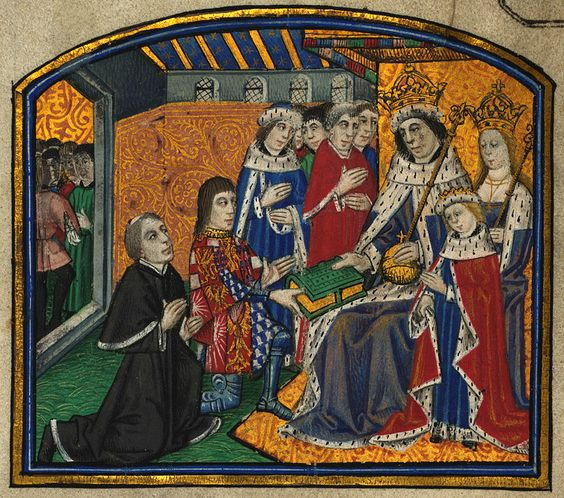
Two of Jacquetta's children are depicted here: Anthony and Elizabeth.

The Visitation of Buckinghamshire of 1566 mentions the marriage of William Dormer of Wycombe (only later of Ascott House) to "Agnes, da. of Sir Richard Woodvyle, Erle Ryvers" but does not say whether the father was the first or the third earl, who the mother was or whether Agnes was legitimate.

== In fiction ==
Jacquetta is a main character in Philippa Gregory's 2009 novel The White Queen, a fictionalized account of the life of her eldest daughter Elizabeth. In the novel, Jacquetta is portrayed as having indeed dabbled quite a bit in witchcraft, displaying what would seem to be actual power. She is also the main protagonist in Gregory's 2011 prequel novel The Lady of the Rivers. Gregory's works explore the historical claim by Jacquetta's family that they were descended from the water deity Melusine. Gregory uses Jacquetta's tenuous ties to Melusine and Joan of Arc to further her potential ties to witchcraft. In the 2013 BBC One/Starz television series adaptation The White Queen, Jacquetta is portrayed by actress Janet McTeer.

Jacquetta is also an important character in Margaret Frazer's fifth "Player Joliffe" novel, A Play of Treachery (2009). The story is set in 1435–6, after the death of her first husband, John, Duke of Bedford. This historical novel tells a tale regarding her marriage to Sir Richard Woodville. There is no mention of witchcraft in this novel.

Jacquetta is also a prominent character in The Last of the Barons (1843), a novel by Edward Bulwer-Lytton (1803–1873). The book's title is a reference to Richard Neville, Earl of Warwick.

== Ancestry ==
Ancestors of Jacquetta of Luxembourg

8. Guy I, Count of Ligny
4. John, Lord of Beauvoir
9. Mathilde of Châtillon
2. Peter I, Count of Saint-Pol
10. Louis, Count of Enghien
5. Margaret, Countess of Brienne
11. Giovanna Sanseverino
1. Jacquetta of Luxembourg
12. Bertrand III, Lord of Baux
6. Francis of Baux
13. Marguerite of Aulnay
3. Margaret of Baux
14. Nicola Orsini, Count of Nola
7. Sueva Orsini
15. Jeanne de Sabran

== Sources ==
- Baldwin, David (2010). Elizabeth Woodville: Mother of the Princes in the Tower. The History Press. Genealogical table 4.
- Gregory, Philippa; Baldwin, David; Jones, Michael (2011). The Women of the Cousins' War. London: Simon & Schuster.
- Griffiths, Ralph A. (1991). "The Court during the Wars of the Roses". In Asch, Ronald G.; Birke, Adolf M. (eds.). Princes Patronage and the Nobility: The Court at the Beginning of the Modern Age, cc. 1450–1650. Oxford University Press. pp. 59–61. ISBN 0-19-920502-7.
- Schirmer, Walter F. (1961). John Lydgate. Translated by Keep, Ann E. University of California Press.
- Wagner, John A., ed. (2001). "Jacquetta of Luxembourg, Duchess of Bedford (c.1416-1472)". Encyclopedia of the Wars of the Roses. ABC-CLIO.
