= Jean, bastard of Luxembourg =

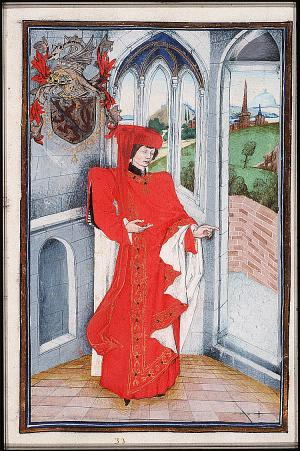

Jean (c. 1400 – 28 July 1466), Lord of Haubourdin, called the Bastard of Luxembourg (French: le Bâtard de Luxembourg) or the Bastard of Saint-Pol (French: Bâtard de Saint-Pol), also named Hennequin, was a nobleman and knight from northern France, a vassal of the duke of Burgundy. He was the illegitimate son of Waleran of Luxembourg, Count of Saint-Pol (whose surname and title gave name to Jean's appellations), by a liaison with Agnès de Brie. Jean fought in the Anglo-Burgundian side during the Hundred Years' War; his first cousins, the counts of Saint-Pol and Ligny, as well as the bishop of Thérouanne, featured prominently in the English administration and military operations in France.

Arms of Jean de Saint-Pol

He was a member of the Council of Philip the Good, Duke of Burgundy, and later of the Great Council of Mechelen, the highest court in the Burgundian Netherlands. In 1433 he was made a Knight in the Order of the Golden Fleece. From 1446 until his death, he was Admiral of the Netherlands outside Flanders.

John married Jacqueline de La Trémoille, daughter of Pierre II de La Trémoille, and widow of André de Toulongeon. They had no children.
