= Saint-Pol =

Saint-Pol may refer to the following places in France :

- Saint-Pol-de-Léon, in the Finistère department
- Saint-Pol-sur-Mer, in the Nord department
- Saint-Pol-sur-Ternoise, in the Pas-de-Calais department
- Hôtel Saint-Pol, a former royal residence in Paris

== See also ==
- County of Saint-Pol, a county around the city of Saint-Pol-sur-Ternoise
- Counts of Saint-Pol, a list of the counts of the county of Saint-Pol
