= Peter of Luxembourg (bishop) =

French Catholic bishop, cardinal and blessed

Blessed Pierre de Luxembourg
- Pseudocardinal; Bishop of Metz
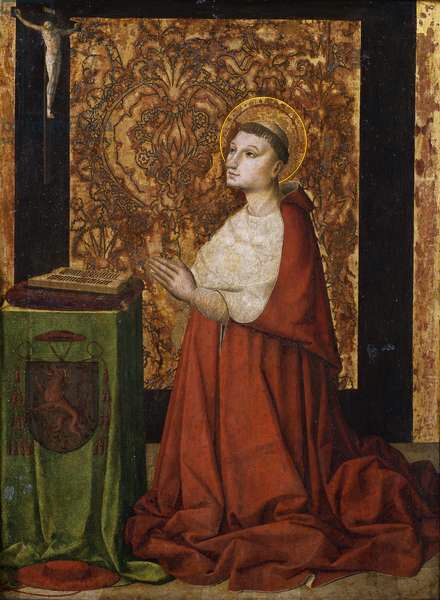
- Vision of Peter of Luxembourg by the Master of the Avignon, circa 1450
- Church: Catholic Church
- Diocese: Metz
- See: Metz
- Appointed: 10 February 1384
- Installed: September 1384
- Term ended: 2 July 1387
- Predecessor: Therri Bayer de Boppard
- Successor: Raoul de Coucy
- Other post: Pseudocardinal-Priest of San Giorgio in Velabro (1384-1387)

Orders
- Ordination: c. 1379
- Consecration: c. 1384
- Created cardinal: 15 April 1384 by Antipope Clement VII
- Rank: Cardinal-Priest

Personal details
- Born: Pierre de Luxembourg; 19 July 1369 Ligny-en-Barrois, Meuse, Kingdom of France
- Died: 2 July 1387 (aged 17) Villeneuve-lès-Avignon, Avignon, Kingdom of France
- Coat of arms: Pierre de Luxembourg's coat of arms

Sainthood
- Feast day: 2 July; 5 July (Carthusians)
- Venerated in: Roman Catholic Church
- Beatified: 9 April 1527; Old Saint Peter's Basilica, Rome, Papal States by Pope Clement VII
- Attributes: Shield; Crucifix; Cardinal's attire
- Patronage: Avignon

Peter of Luxembourg (French: Pierre; 19 July 1369 – 2 July 1387) was a French Catholic prelate who served as the bishop of Metz. He is venerated in the Catholic Church as a blessed, having been beatified by Pope Clement VII, 140 years after his death.

Pierre was descended from nobles who secured his entrance into the priesthood when he started to serve in several places as a canon before he was named as the bishop of Metz and a pseudocardinal under an antipope. He was noted for his austerities and successes in diocesan reform as well as for his dedication to the faithful and tried to end the Western Schism that pitted pope against antipope and rulers against rulers. His efforts were in vain and he was soon driven from Metz but moved to southern France where he died as a result of his harsh self-imposed penances.

Both sides in the conflict recognized his deep holiness and his dedication to the people in Metz and elsewhere. After many appeals for him to be beatified, Pope Clement VII beatified him on 9 April 1527.

== Life ==
Pierre de Luxembourg was born at the castle of Ligny-sur-Ornain in July 1369, the second of six children to Guy of Luxembourg, Count of Ligny (1340-1371) and Mahaut de Châtillon (1335-1378). He was orphaned by the age of four, which prompted his aunt Jeanne - the countess of Orgières - to raise him in Paris.

Pierre was uncle to Louis de Luxembourg and the quasi-cardinal Thibault de Luxembourg; he was the great-granduncle of Philippe de Luxembourg.

In 1377 he began studies at the Parisian college. In 1379 he was elected a canon for the cathedral chapter of Notre Dame de Paris. In 1381 he traveled to London to offer himself as a hostage to the English in order to secure his brother's release. The English were so perplexed yet enthralled with this offer that his brother was returned to France. Hearing this, Richard II invited him to remain at his court, but Pierre returned to Paris to pursue his vocation to the priesthood. That same year he became a canon for the cathedral chapter of Notre Dame de Chartres and was made Archdeacon of Dreux in the Chartres diocese. He had a great devotion to the passion and the cross of Christ. In 1382 he was elected Archdeacon for Cambrai.

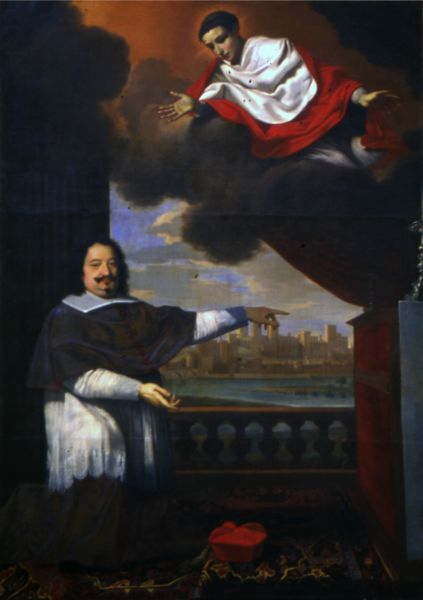
Sforza places Avignon under the protection of Pierre during the plague outbreak.

=== Bishop ===
In 1384 the episcopal see of Metz became vacant. The selection of a new bishop was complicated by the Western Schism in which the Kingdom of France supported Antipope Clement VII while the Holy Roman Emperor supported Pope Urban VI. The antipope named Pierre as Bishop of Metz in 1384 and he was enthroned there that September entering barefoot on a mule. He divided diocesan revenues into thirds: the first two were for the Church and the poor and the third for his household. He was able to take Metz with armed troops for a brief period of time but was forced to withdraw sometime in 1385. About this time Pope Urban VI named Tilman Vuss de Bettenburg as the legitimate Bishop of Metz.

After King Charles VI and Duke John of Berry asked the antipope to make Pierre a cardinal, he was made cardinal priest of San Giorgio in Velabro on 15 April 1384. During his time as a pseudocardinal he attempted without success to end the Western Schism. The antipope invited Pierre on 23 September 1386 to join him at his court in Avignon where he remained until his death.

Pierre died in July 2, 1387 from fever that resulted from the austerities he had imposed upon himself; he had fallen ill in March. He died at the Carthusian convent in Villeneuve-lès-Avignon in Avignon. His wished to be buried in a common grave as paupers were. In 1387, the mystic Marie Robine was reportedly healed at his tomb. On 16 March 1395, his brother Jean ordered the construction of a church dedicated to the sainted Pope Celestine V and Pierre's remains were transferred there.

== Veneration ==
The subject of his canonization was raised at the Council of Basel but without a solid conclusion. In 1432 he was named the patron saint of Avignon. His cult following included Metz and Paris in addition to Verdun and Luxembourg. His beatification had been requested on numerous occasions. Queen Maria of Naples made one such request on 1 February 1388 as did several other nobles and princes. The process was opened on numerous occasions but faced frequent interruptions (1389 and 1390 and later 1433 and 1435). Pope Clement VII beatified Pierre in 1527.

In 1597 his relics were taken to Paris where they were damaged during the French Revolution. In 1629 Pope Urban VIII allowed the Carthusians to celebrate a Mass and the Divine Office in his name. The vice-legate Sforza placed the city under his protection during a 1640 plague outbreak. Since 1854 his relics have been venerated in the Saint-Didier church in Avignon, in Châteauneuf-du-Pape and in Ligny-en-Barrois.

== Sources ==
- Brown-Grant, Rosalind; Damen, Mario, eds. (2022). A Chivalric Life: The Book of the Deeds of Messire Jacques de Lalaing. The Boydell Press. ISBN 9781783277216.
- Pascoe, Louis (2004). Church and Reform: Bishops, Theologians, and Canon Lawyers in the Thought of Pierre D'Ailly (1351-1420). Brill. ISBN 9789047406181.
- Warner, Marina (1981). Joan of Arc: The Image of Female Heroism. University of California Press. p. 14. ISBN 0-520-22464-7.
