= Louis, Lord of Enghien =

14th century nobleman

Louis of Enghien
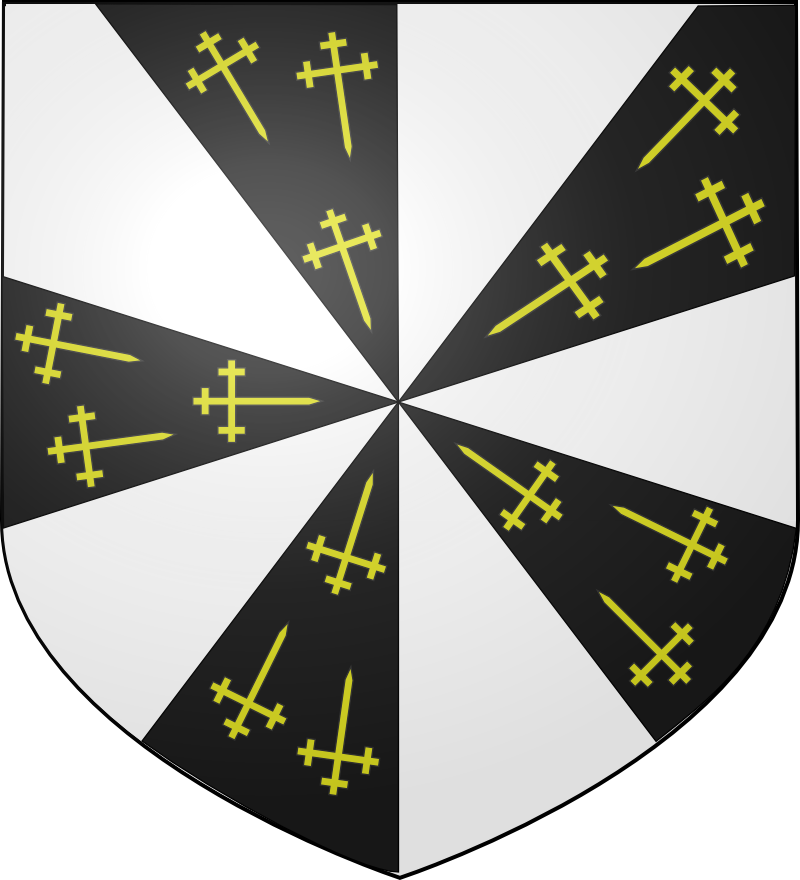
- Enghien coat of arms
- Died: March 17, 1394; Conversano
- Spouse: Giovanna of Sanseverino
- Issue: Margaret, Countess of Brienne
- Father: Walter III of Enghien
- Mother: Isabella of Brienne

Louis of Enghien (died March 17, 1394) titular Duke of Athens, Count of Brienne and Lord of Enghien in 1381–1394, Count of Conversano in 1356–1394.

== Biography ==
Louis was the fourth son of Walter III of Enghien and Isabella of Brienne. When his mother divided the inheritance of his uncle Walter VI of Brienne among her sons, he received the title of Count of Conversano.

In 1370, after Philip II of Taranto had secured the undisputed control of the Principality of Achaea against Maria of Bourbon, he was sent as Philip's bailli to the principality, which also included the lordship of Argos and Nauplia, ruled by his brother Guy. He remained in the position until 1371. From this position he and his brothers, including John of Enghien, wrote to the Doge of Venice to request Venetian aid in reclaiming the Duchy of Athens, which had been in their family's hands until 1311, from the Catalan Company, but help was not forthcoming. On the death of his childless nephew Walter V of Enghien in 1381, he also became titular Duke of Athens, Count of Brienne and Lord of Enghien.

He married Giovanna of Sanseverino, and they had four daughters: Margaret, Yolanda, Isabella, and Helena. On his death, at Conversano, on March 17, 1394, his titles were inherited by his eldest daughter

- Margaret (born 1365). In 1380, Margaret married John of Luxembourg, Lord of Beauvoir (1370–1397), son of Guy of Luxembourg and Mahaut of Châtillon, by whom she had issue, including
  - Peter I of Luxembourg, Count of St. Pol, of Brienne and of Conversano, and
  - John II of Luxembourg, Count of Ligny.

Peter I married in his own turn, Margaret de Baux, by whom he had nine children: among them are Louis, Count of St. Pol, Brienne, and Conversano, and Jacquetta (mother of Queen consort Elizabeth Woodville).

Louis was one of the founding members of the Order of the Ship of King Charles III (1381).

== Sources ==
- Boulton, D'A. J. D. (1985). "The Middle French Statutes of the Monarchical Order of the Ship (Naples, 1381): A Critical Edition, with Introduction and Notes". Mediaeval Studies. 47: 168–271. doi:10.1484/J.MS.2.306327.
- Luttrell, Anthony (1966). "The Latins of Argos and Nauplia: 1311-1394". Papers of the British School at Rome. 34. British School at Rome: 34–55. doi:10.1017/S0068246200007455. JSTOR 40310660. S2CID 179112752.

French nobility
Preceded by Walter VII	Count of Brienne; 1381–1394	Succeeded by Margaret
