= Louis, Count of Saint-Pol =

Noble and Constable of France (1418–1475)

Louis de Luxembourg, Count of Saint-Pol
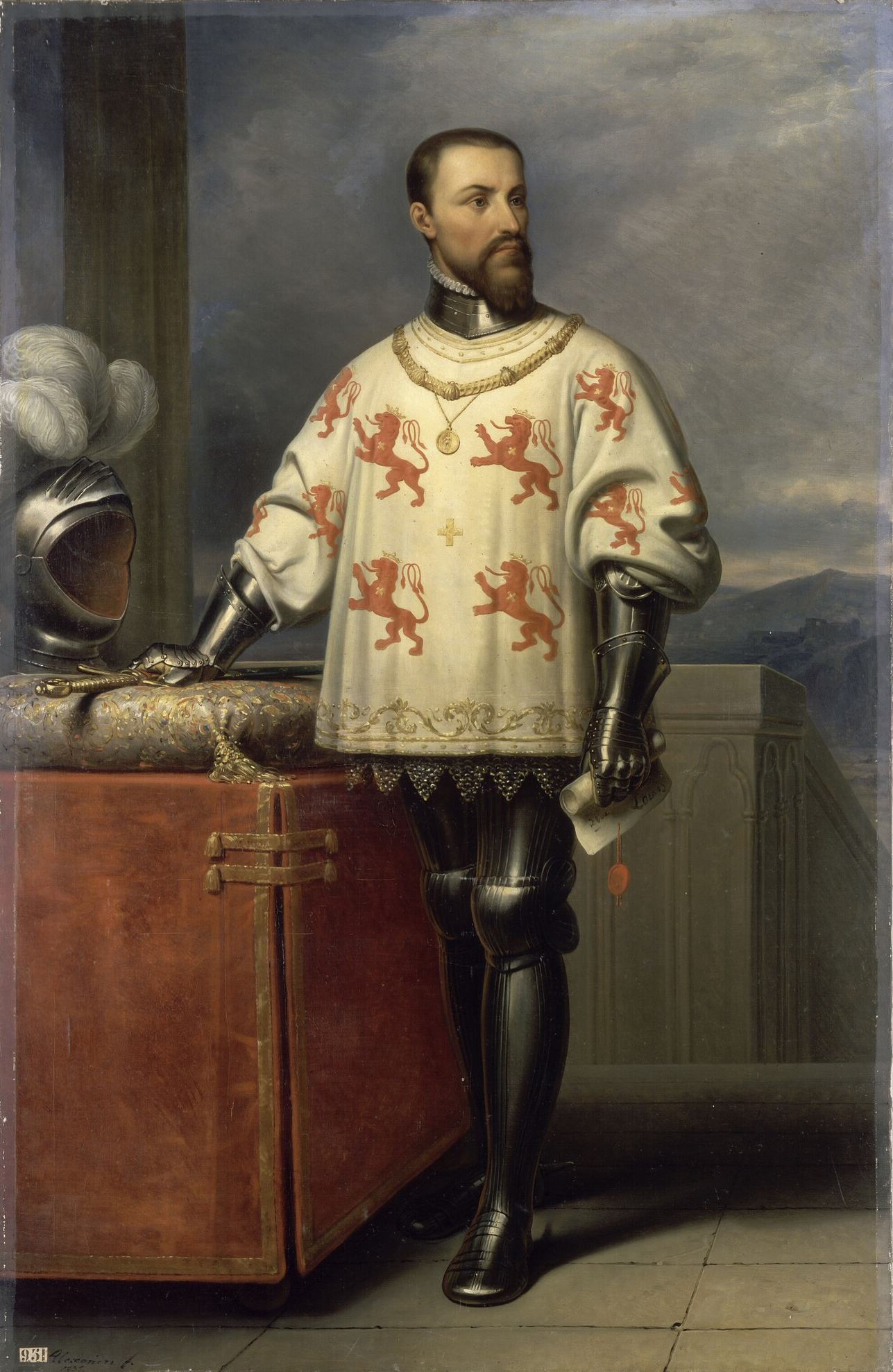
- Later portrait of Louis, Comte de Saint-Pol
- Born: 1418
- Died: 19 December 1475 (aged 56–57); Paris
- Noble family: House of Luxembourg
- Spouses: Jeanne de Bar, Countess of Marle and Soissons; Marie of Savoy
- Issue: John of Luxembourg, Count of Soissons; Peter II, Count of Saint-Pol; Jacqueline of Luxembourg; Anthony I, Count of Ligny
- Father: Peter I, Count of Saint-Pol
- Mother: Margaret de Baux

Louis de Luxembourg, Count of Saint-Pol, of Brienne, de Ligny, and Conversano (1418 – 19 December 1475) belonged to the Ligny branch of the House of Luxemburg and was Constable of France.

== Life ==
Saint-Pol was the eldest son of Peter of Luxembourg and Margaret de Baux. His name originates from the fact that he was a 7th generation descendant of Count Henry V of Luxembourg, and thus belonged to the French branch of the House of Luxembourg. His older sister Jacqueline, better known as Jacquetta of Luxembourg, married John of Lancaster, Duke of Bedford, and Louis was initially a supporter of the Lancastrian cause in the English Wars of the Roses.

He was brought up by his uncle, Count John II of Ligny, who named Louis as heir to his estates. However, King Charles VII of France sequestrated the estates on John's death in 1441. As a result, Saint-Pol sought a rapprochement with the French king and duly had his inheritance restored to him. However, the county of Guise was claimed by Charles, Count of Maine. The affair was settled by an agreement that Saint-Pol's sister Isabelle would marry the Count of Maine and receive the disputed lands as her dowry.

== War against the King ==
Saint-Pol became a close friend of the Dauphin Louis, the future King Louis XI, and fought with him in Flanders and in Normandy. However, in 1465 Saint-Pol broke with his friend, now King, to join with the King's brother, Charles, Duke of Berry in the League of the Public Weal. At the battle of Montlhéry, he commanded the van of Charles the Bold's army, yet later was made constable of France by Louis XI. The Treaty of Conflans ended the war, while Saint-Pol received the hand of the King's sister-in-law, Marie of Savoy.

After this, he was persistently disloyal to the King, conspiring with Charles, Count of Charolais, and with Edward IV of England (the husband of his niece, Elizabeth Woodville). The final treason came in 1474 when Saint-Pol approached Charles the Bold, Duke of Burgundy, who had already entered into a compact with Edward IV of England to dismember France in a renewal of the Hundred Years' War. The scheme envisaged the murder of Louis and the sub-division of France between Saint-Pol, the Dukes of Burgundy, Brittany, Bourbon and Nemours, the Count of Maine and King Edward. Saint-Pol then proceeded to draw other magnates into the conspiracy.

The whole thing started to unravel after Louis and Edward concluded the Treaty of Picquigny in August 1475. Angered by this, Saint-Pol was imprudent enough to write to Edward, upbraiding him as a "cowardly, dishonoured and beggarly king". Edward promptly forwarded the letter to Louis, who now had all the proof he needed. A messenger was sent to the conspirator, in which he was informed that the King had 'need of a head such as his.' He was arrested in September 1475, and later imprisoned in the Bastille. Execution followed in December. Philippe de Commynes, the chief chronicler of Louis' reign, was to write that Saint-Pol had been "abandoned by God because he had tried with all his might to prolong the hostilities between the King and the Duke of Burgundy."

From 1468 to 1472 his chaplain was the well-known translator, author and scribe Jean Miélot.

== Marriage and children ==
Louis de Luxembourg married twice, first to Jeanne de Bar, Countess of Marle and Soissons (died 1462), and secondly to Marie of Savoy. He left at least nine legitimate children, including:

- John of Luxembourg, Count of Soissons
- Peter II, Count of Saint-Pol
- Jacqueline of Luxembourg, married Philip I de Croÿ, Count of Porcéan (died 1511).
- Anthony I of Luxembourg, Count of Ligny
- Charles of Luxembourg, Bishop of Laon (died 1509).
