= Marie Robine =

French mystic

Marie Robine (d. 1399), also known as Marie of Avignon or Marie the Gasque, was a French mystic who was active during the time of the Western Schism.

== Biography ==
Robine's hometown was Héchac, near Soublecause in what is now Hautes-Pyrénées. In 1387, Marie was miraculously cured of a paralytic condition at the tomb of Pierre de Luxembourg, an event witnessed by Antipope Clement VII. Thereafter, she received financial support from the Avignon line of papal claimants, allowing her to live nearby as a recluse.

In the spring of 1398, she traveled to Paris in the hope of influencing Charles VI of France to continue his support of Antipope Benedict XIII, the successor of Clement. In this she was unsuccessful, as on 27 July 1398 a church council held at the University of Paris voted to withdraw obedience from Benedict XIII.

Marie withdrew to her life of solitude and until her death in 1399 received at least a dozen revelations which were recorded. On 9 November 1398, while praying to understand the disunion of the church, Marie reportedly had a vision of the different Christian sects accompanied by gold and silver idols. A star appeared, surrounded by men weeping, and an angel gathered the tears and poured them over their heads. The Lord explained to Marie that men who deny the importance of visions or revelations are akin to idolators, and that the specific men in the vision were the masters of theology at the University of Paris who had refused her an audience. At the Lord's prompting, Marie wrote a letter to the university warning of divine punishment promised to idolators.

Marie Robine's profile was raised posthumously as her prophecies were cited to support Joan of Arc. Jean Barbin, a witness at Joan of Arc's 1456 retrial, testified that in 1429, shortly after Joan had met with the Dauphin, a master of theology named Jean Erault had raised the possibility that Joan's arrival had been foretold. According to Erault, Marie Robine had received a vision of an armed woman being called to save the kingdom and was afraid that it applied to herself, but was reassured by her vision that the maid destined for battle was yet to come.

However, that incident is not among Marie's recorded prophecies, raising the possibility that Erault or Barbin was mistaken or confabulating. During the later stages of the Hundred Years War, prophecies attributed to figures such as Marie Robine or the Venerable Bede were widely promoted in France as proof that Joan of Arc's mission was preordained.

== In fiction ==
In the historical drama Saint Joan by George Bernard Shaw, the Dauphin (and future Charles VII of France) declares his willingness to meet Joan of Arc because of his family's history with religious mystics:

My grandfather had a saint who used to float in the air when she was praying, and told him everything he wanted to know. My poor father had two saints, Marie de Maillé and the Gasque of Avignon. It is in our family; and I don't care what you say: I will have my saint too.
