= Guy I of Ligny =

Count of St. Pol and Ligny

Guy I of Luxembourg-Ligny
- Born: 1340
- Died: 23 August 1371 (aged 30–31); Baesweiler
- Noble family: Luxembourg
- Spouse: Mahaut of Châtillon
- Issue Detail: Waleran III, Count of Ligny; Pierre de Luxembourg; Margaret of Luxembourg; John, Lord of Beauvoir; Joan, Countess of Ligny
- Father: John I of Luxembourg, Lord of Ligny
- Mother: Alix of Dampierre

Guy I of Luxembourg-Ligny (1340 – 23 August 1371) was Count of Saint-Pol (1360–1371) and Count of Ligny, Lord of Roussy and Beauvoir (1364–1371).

He was the son of John I and Alix of Dampierre, dame de Richebourg.

Guy participated in the Battle of Baesweiler (present-day Germany), a conflict between his relative Wenceslaus I of Luxembourg, husband of the Duchess of Brabant on the one side, and William II, Duke of Jülich and Edward, Duke of Guelders on the other side. Guy was killed during the battle.

== Marriage and children ==
In 1354, Guy married Mahaut de Châtillon (1335–1378), Countess of Saint-Pol, daughter of Jean de Châtillon-Saint-Pol and Jeanne de Fiennes, and had:

- Waleran III (1356–1415), Count of Ligny and of Saint-Pol
- Pierre (1369–1387), bishop of Metz and cardinal, beatified in 1527
- Margaret, married in 1377 Peter of Enghien, died in 1384, and in 1396 with Jean III de Werchin et Cysoing, died at the Battle of Agincourt
- John of Luxembourg, Lord of Beauvoir (1370–1397), married Margaret, Countess of Brienne. He started a cadet branch of the House of Saint-Pol and was the father of Peter of Luxembourg, Count of Saint-Pol and John II of Luxembourg, Count of Ligny.
- André (died 1396), Bishop of Cambrai
- Marie, married Jean de Condé (died 1391), and Simon, count of Salm (died 1397)
- Joan, Countess of Ligny (died 1430)

== Sources ==
- Boffa, Sergio (2004). Warfare in Medieval Brabant, 1356-1406, Volume 17. The Boydell Press.
- Brown-Grant, Rosalind; Damen, Mario, eds. (2022). A Chivalric Life: The Book of the Deeds of Messire Jacques de Lalaing. The Boydell Press.
- Bubenicek, Michelle (2002). Quand les femmes gouvernent: droit et politique au XIVe siècle. Ecole de Chartes.
- Gregory, Philippa; Baldwin, David; Jones, Michael, eds. (2011). The Women of the Cousins' War: The Duchess, the Queen, and the King's Mother. Simon & Schuster Inc.
- Hoensch, Jorg K. (2000). Die Luxemburger: Ein spatmittelalterliche Dynastie gesamteuropaischer Bedeutung, 1308-1437 (in German). Verlag W. Kohlhammer. ISBN 3-17-015159-2.

Guy I of Ligny House of Luxembourg-Ligny Born: 1340 Died: 23 August 1371
Preceded by Guy V	Count of Saint-Pol (jure uxoris); 1360–1371	Succeeded by Waleran III
Preceded by John I	Count of Ligny; 1364–1371	Succeeded by Waleran III
