= Jacques de Luxembourg, Seigneur de Richebourg =

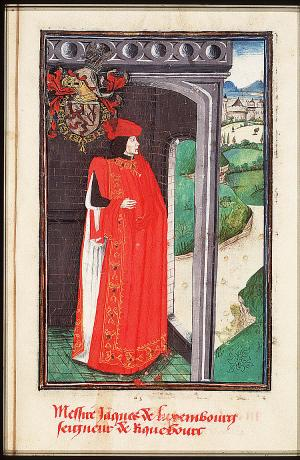
Jacques de Luxembourg as Knight in the Order of the Golden Fleece (Den Haag, KB, 76 E 10, fol. 71r)

Jacques de Luxembourg, Seigneur de Richebourg (1426 – Nantes, 20 August 1487) was a noble who served Charles the Bold, Duke of Burgundy and later King Louis XI of France.

== Early life ==
Jacques was the son of Peter I, Count of Saint-Pol and Margaret of Baux.

== Career ==
He fought beside Arthur de Richemont, Constable of France, at Formigny. He was knighted after the Battle of Gavere on 23 July 1453. In the following years, he served Charles the Bold, Duke of Burgundy as an army commander. In 1468 he was awarded the Order of the Golden Fleece. Supporting the Burgundians, Jacques was wounded and captured by the French near Arras. While convalescing in Paris, he agreed to serve Louis XI and was made chamberlain. He received the French Order of Saint Michael.

== Personal life ==
He married firstly Jeanne, Countess of Sarrewerden and Moers. After her death, he married Isabelle de Roubaix (1415–1498), a daughter of Pierre de Roubaix. Together, they had two sons, who died young, and three daughters, including:

- François de Luxembourg (b. 1472), who died young.
- Charles de Luxembourg, who died young.
- Isabelle de Luxembourg, who married Jean III de Melun, Baron of Antoing and Constable of Normandy.
- Yolande de Luxembourg (d. 1534), who married Nicolas, Lord of Werchin.
- Louise de Luxembourg (d. 1518), who married Jan van Gistel, Heer van Dudzeele, and Antoine de Cröy, Lord of Tours-sur-Marne.

Jacques died in 1487 and was buried at the Cistercian abbey at Cercamp. He was succeeded by his daughter Isabelle.
