= Margaret, Countess of Brienne =

Countess of Brienne and Conversano

Marguerite d'Enghien
- Countess of Brienne; Countess of Conversano; Heiress of Enghien; Lady of Beauvoir
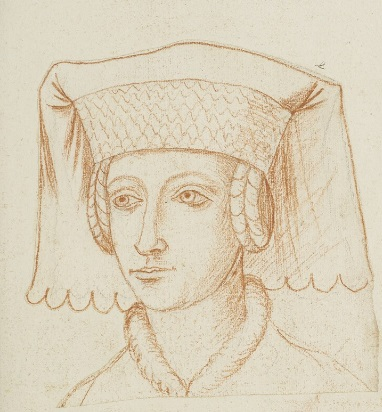
- Born: 1365
- Died: Unknown
- Noble family: Enghien
- Spouses: Pierre de Baux; Giacopo Sanseverino; John of Luxembourg, Sire of Beauvoir
- Issue: Peter of Luxembourg, Count of Saint-Pol; John II of Luxembourg, Count of Ligny; Louis of Luxembourg; Catherine of Luxembourg; Jeanne of Luxembourg
- Father: Louis of Enghien
- Mother: Giovanna of Sanseverino

Marguerite d'Enghien (born 1365 - d. after 1394), was the ruling suo jure Countess of Brienne and of Conversano, suo jure Lady of Enghien, and Lady of Beauvoir from 1394 until an unknown date.

== Life ==
Marguerite was born in 1365, the eldest daughter of Louis of Enghien, Count of Brienne and Conversano, Lord of Enghien, Titular Duke of Athens, and Giovanna of Sanseverino. Marguerite had a brother, Antoine who died at the age of sixteen, leaving her, the eldest daughter, heir to her father's estates and titles.

She inherited the counties of Brienne and of Conversano, and the Lordship of Enghien from her father Louis of Enghien on 17 March 1394. She was the wife of John of Luxembourg, Sire of Beauvoir and the mother of Peter of Luxembourg, Count of Saint-Pol, Count of Brienne and of Conversano who inherited her fiefs, and John II of Luxembourg, Count of Ligny.

=== Reign ===
Marguerite became the suo jure Countess of Brienne and Conversano, and Dame of Enghien upon her father's death on 17 March 1394. Her husband John also became Count of Brienne and of Conversano by right of his wife.

She died on an unknown date sometime after 1394. Her will was dated 19 September 1393. Her eldest son, Peter received her titles of Brienne and of Conversano.

== Marriages and issue ==
On an unknown date, Marguerite married her first husband, Pierre de Baux, and following his death, she married as her second husband, a relative of her mother, Giacopo of Sanseverino. Both of these early marriages were childless.

In 1380, after Giacopo's death, Marguerite married her third husband, John of Luxembourg, Sire of Beauvoir (1370–1397). He was the son of Guy of Luxembourg, Count of Saint-Pol and Mahaut of Châtillon, Countess of Saint-Pol. By her third husband, Marguerite had five children:

- Peter of Luxembourg (1390–31 August 1433), Count of Saint-Pol (1430), which he inherited from his aunt Jeanne of Luxembourg, Countess of Saint-Pol and Ligny; he also inherited, on an unknown date, Marguerite's fiefs of Brienne and of Conversano, thus becoming Count of Brienne and of Conversano. He married on 8 May 1405, Margaret de Baux, by whom he had nine children, including Jacquetta of Luxembourg, mother of Elizabeth Woodville Queen-Consort of Edward IV of England.
- John II of Luxembourg, Count of Ligny (1392–5 January 1441), inherited the title of Beauvoir from his father, and the title of Ligny from his aunt, Jeanne of Luxembourg. On 23 November 1418, married Jeanne de Béthune, widow of Robert of Bar, Count of Marle and Soissons who had been killed at the Battle of Agincourt on 25 October 1415. John, who was an ally of the English during the Hundred Years War, received Joan of Arc as his prisoner, and subsequently sold her to the English for 10,000 livres.
- Louis of Luxembourg (died 18 September 1443). He was a statesman and a high-ranking churchman. His posts and clerical titles included Cardinal (1439), Archbishop of Rouen (1437), Chancellor of France (1425), Governor of Paris (1436), Bishop of Thérouanne, Administrator of Ely (1437), Bishop of Frascati (1442). He was buried in Ely Cathedral.
- Catherine of Luxembourg (born c. 1393)
- Jeanne of Luxembourg (died 1420), married firstly, on 8 September 1415, Louis, Seigneur de Ghistelles (killed at the Battle of Agincourt); she married secondly on 28 October 1419, Jean IV, Viscount of Melun, Constable of Flanders.

== Sources ==
- Luttrell, Anthony (1982). Latin Greece, the Hospitallers and the Crusades, 1291-1440. Variorum.
