= Catherine of Luxembourg-Saint-Pol =

Catherine of Luxembourg-Saint-Pol (died 1492), was a Duchess consort of Brittany, married to Arthur III, Duke of Brittany. She was a daughter of Peter of Luxembourg, Count of Saint-Pol and Margherita del Balzo.

Catherine's marriage to Arthur III took place on 2 July 1445. In December 1445 she went to Nantes, where her husband organized wedding celebrations in her honor. Then she lived in Parthenay and travelled only in 1457 with her husband again to Brittany, because his nephew, the duke Peter II, had fallen ill. After Peter's death (22 September 1457) Arthur III became new Duke and therefore his wife Catherine briefly Duchess consort of Brittany, but Arthur already died on 26 December 1458 at Nantes at the age of 65 years. His marriage with Catherine had remained childless. Catherine lived as widow a secluded life, probably died in March 1492 and was buried in the Carthusian monastery of Nantes, which she had finished.

Royal titles
Preceded by Françoise d'Amboise	Duchess consort of Brittany; 1457–1458	Succeeded by Margaret of Brittany
