= Waleran III of Ligny =

French nobleman and soldier

Waleran III of Luxembourg
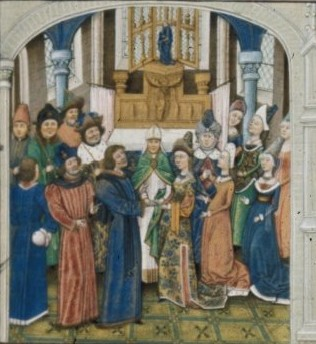

Count of Ligny and Saint-Pol
- Reign: 1371 - 1415
- Predecessor: Guy I
- Successor: Philip
- Born: 1355
- Died: 12 April 1415
- Spouse: Maud Holland (c.1374 - 1392); Bona of Bar (c.1392 - 1400)
- Issue: Jeanne of Luxembourg
- House: House of Luxemburg
- Father: Guy of Luxembourg
- Mother: Mahaut of Châtillon

Waleran III of Luxembourg (1355 – 12 April 1415) Count of Ligny and Saint Pol, was a French nobleman and soldier.

== Life ==
Waleran was the son of Guy of Luxembourg and Mahaut of Châtillon. His name originates from the fact that he was a 5th generation descendant of Henry V, Count of Luxembourg, and thus belonged to the French branch of the House of Luxembourg.

Waleran succeeded his father in 1371, after his death at the Battle of Baesweiler. Waleran was captured at the same battle, but released through the intercession of Charles IV, Holy Roman Emperor. In 1374, he was captured by the English before Ardres and sent to Windsor as a prisoner. The English attempted to exchange him for Jean III de Grailly, captal de Buch, but without success. In 1380, while a captive, Waleran married Maud Holland (d. 1392), daughter of Thomas Holland, 1st Earl of Kent and Joan of Kent and Richard II's half-sister. He did homage, to King Richard II of England, for his French domains, which allowed him to negotiate down his ransom, and he was released soon afterwards.

After Maud's death, Waleran married Bona of Bar (d. 1400), daughter of Duke Robert of Bar and Marie of Valois (daughter of King John II of France), but they had no children. He was one of the peace commissioners sent to London in 1396. On 30 December 1396, Waleran was made governor of Genoa.

Waleran wrote to King Henry IV of England a letter on 9 November 1403, stating his intentions to attack England. He declared a personal grudge against the man who had killed and replaced, his relative, Richard II. He blockaded Calais in 1403, stopping all overland commerce into the town ordering the arrest of any English merchants. Later in 1405, he made a futile attack on the English at Mercq near Calais.

Waleran was of the party of Philip II, Duke of Burgundy, marrying his daughter to Philip's son Antoine. Under the Burgundians he obtained preferment, becoming Grand Maître des Eaux et Forêts, the governor of Paris in 1410, and Constable of France in 1411. However, he lost the Constableship and was driven from Paris with the rest of the Burgundians in 1413. He died in 1415 and was succeeded by his grandson Philip of Saint-Pol.

== Marriage and issue ==
Waleran and Maud had:

- Jeanne (d. 1407), who married Antoine, Duke of Brabant in 1401.

By his mistress, Agnes de Brie, Waleran had:

- John, bastard of St. Pol, called Hennequin, lord of Hautbordin.(d.1466)

== Ancestors ==
Ancestors of Waleran III of Ligny

8. Waleran II of Luxembourg, Lord of Ligny
4. John I of Luxembourg
9. Guyotte of Lille
2. Guy of Luxembourg
10. Guy V of Richebourg
5. Alix of Dampierre
11. Beatrix of Putten
1. Waleran III of Luxembourg
12. Guy III of Chatillon
6. John of Châtillon, Count of Saint-Pol
13. Marie of Brittany, Countess of Saint-Pol
3. Mahaut of Châtillon
14. John of Fiennes, Lord of Tingry
7. Joanna of Fiennes
15. Isabella of Dampierre

== Sources ==
- Boffa, Sergio (2004). Warfare in Medieval Brabant, 1356-1406, Volume 17. The Boydell Press.
- Bubenicek, Michelle (2002). Quand les femmes gouvernent: droit et politique au XIVe siècle (in French). Ecole de Chartes.
- Given-Wilson, Chris (2008). "The Quarrel of Old Women": Henry IV, Louis of Orleans, and Anglo-French Chivalric Challenges in the Early Fifteenth Century". In Dodd, Gwilym; Biggs, Douglas (eds.). The Reign of Henry IV: Rebellion and Survival, 1403-1413. York Medieval Press.
- Sumption, Jonathan (2015). The Hundred Years War. Vol. 4: Cursed Kings. Faber & Faber.
- Taylor, Craig (2019). A Virtuous Knight: Defending Marshal Boucicaut (Jean II Le Meingre, 1366-1421). York Medieval Press.
- Vaughan, Richard (2009). Philip the Bold. The Boydell Press.
- Warner, Kathryn (2017). Richard II: A True King's Fall. Amberley Publishing Limited.
- de Wavrin, Jean (2012). Hardy, William (ed.). Recueil Des Chroniques Et Anchiennes Istories de la Grant Bretaigne (in French). Vol. 3: From A.D. 1422 to A.D. 1431. Cambridge University Press.

Waleran III of Ligny House of Luxemburg Born: 1355 Died: 25 October 1415
French nobility
Preceded by Guy of Luxembourg	Count of Ligny; 1371–1415	Succeeded by Philip of Saint-Pol
Preceded by Mahaut of Châtillon	Count of Saint Pol; 1378–1415	Succeeded by Philip of Saint-Pol
Political offices
Preceded by Charles I of Albret	Constable of France (Burgundian); 1411–1413; Disputed by Charles I of Albret	Succeeded by Charles I of Albret
