= John, Lord of Beauvoir =

John of Luxembourg
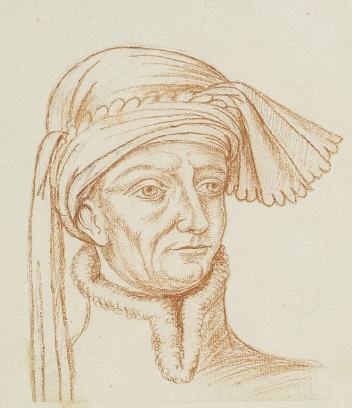

Lord of Beauvoir and Richebourg as John I
- Reign: 1387–1397
- Predecessor: Waleran III
- Successor: John II

Count of Brienne and Conversano, Lord of Enghien as John II
- Reign: 1394–1397 with Margaret, Countess of Brienne
- Predecessor: Louis, Count of Enghien
- Successor: Peter I of Luxembourg
- Born: c. 1370
- Died: bef. 2 July 1397; Italy
- Spouse: Margaret, Countess of Brienne (1387–1397)
- Issue: Peter I of Luxembourg; John II of Luxembourg, Count of Ligny; Louis of Luxembourg; Catherine of Luxembourg; Jeanne of Luxembourg
- House: House of Luxembourg
- Father: Guy I of Luxembourg
- Mother: Mahaut of Châtillon

John of Luxembourg (Jean de Luxembourg) (c. 1370 – bef. 2 July 1397, Italy), was Lord of Beauvoir (or Beaurevoir) and Richebourg, and also (as John II) Count of Brienne and Conversano (iure uxoris).

He was a member of the French branch of the House of Luxembourg, the son of Guy I of Luxembourg, Count of Ligny and Mahaut de Châtillon (1335–1378), Countess of Saint-Pol. Blessed Pierre de Luxembourg was his brother.

John married around 1387 with Margaret, Countess of Brienne, daughter of Louis of Enghien, suo jure heiress of the counties of Brienne and of Conversano, and the Lordship of Enghien.

They had:

- Peter I of Luxembourg (1390 – 31 August 1433), Count of Saint-Pol and Count of Brienne
- John II of Luxembourg, Count of Ligny (1392 – 5 January 1441), inherited the title of Beauvoir from his father, and the title of Ligny from his aunt, Jeanne of Luxembourg.
- Louis of Luxembourg (died 18 September 1443). He was a statesman and a high-ranking churchman.
- Catherine of Luxembourg (born c. 1393)
- Jeanne of Luxembourg (died 1420), married firstly, on 8 September 1415, Louis, Seigneur de Ghistelles (killed at the Battle of Agincourt); she married secondly on 28 October 1419, Jean IV, Viscount of Melun, Constable of Flanders.

== Sources ==
- Hughes, David (2007). The British Chronicles. Vol. 2. Heritage books.
- de Wavrin, Jean (2012). Hardy, William (ed.). Recueil Des Chroniques Et Anchiennes Istories de la Grant Bretaigne (in French). Vol. 3: From A.D. 1422 to A.D. 1431. Cambridge University Press.
