= Joan, Countess of Ligny =

Countess of Ligny and Saint-Pol in 1430

Joan, Countess of Saint-Pol and Ligny (died 18 September 1430, Avignon), called the Demoiselle de Luxembourg, was the ruling Countess of Saint Pol and Ligny in 1430.

She was the daughter of Guy of Luxembourg, Count of Ligny and Mahaut of Châtillon, Countess of Saint-Pol. She did not marry, and had no children.

At the death of Philip I, Duke of Brabant, she was his nearest living relative on the Saint-Pol side and inherited Saint-Pol and Ligny upon his death on 14 August 1430. She was living at the time at Beaurevoir, which belonged to her favourite nephew John.

At this time, John held Joan of Arc, whom he had captured, as a prisoner. The Demoiselle de Luxembourg showed kindness to her and pleaded with her nephew not to sell Joan to the English, giving him a promise to make him her heir if he did not.

The Demoiselle died shortly thereafter; her fiefs were divided between her senior nephew, the Count of Brienne, who received Saint-Pol, and John, her favourite, who received Ligny.

== Fiction ==
The Demoiselle is a character in Philippa Gregory's 2011 historical novel The Lady of the Rivers, which centres on her great-niece Jacquetta of Luxembourg.

Joan is depicted in the 1999 miniseries Joan of Arc where she appears in the credits as "Madame de Beaurevoir", played by Shirley MacLaine.

Preceded by Philip	Countess of Saint Pol; 1430	Succeeded by Peter I
Preceded by Philip	Countess of Ligny; 1430	Succeeded by John II
