= John of Luxembourg, Count of Soissons =

French nobleman (died 1476)

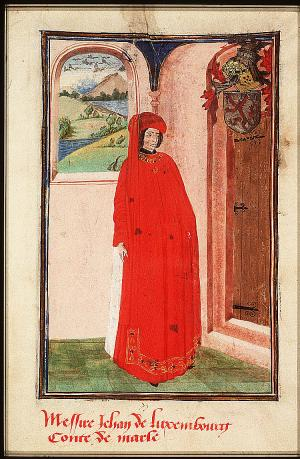
John of Luxembourg in the Armory of the Order of the Golden Fleece

John of Luxembourg (died 22 June 1476) was Count of Marle and Count of Soissons between 1462 and 1476, Lord of Dunkirk, Gravelines and Bourbourg.

John was the eldest son of Louis de Luxembourg, Count of Saint-Pol and Jeanne de Bar, Countess of Marle and Soissons. He became Count of Marle and Soissons, following the death of his mother in 1462. In 1473, John became a member in the Order of the Golden Fleece. He was unable to inherit his father's lands, since his father was beheaded for treason in 1475 and his lands confiscated.

John was killed at the Battle of Morat, 22 June 1476. He never married and his lands went to his younger brother Peter.

== Sources ==
- de Schryver, Antoine (2008). The Prayer Book of Charles the Bold: A Study of a Flemish Masterpiece from the Burgundian Court. J. Paul Getty Museum.
- Wijsman, Hanno (2010). Luxury Bound: Illustrated Manuscript Production and Noble and Princely Book Ownership in the Burgundian Netherlands (1400-1550). Brepols.
- Raphael de Smedt (Ed.) : Les chevaliers de l’ordre de la Toison d’or au XVe siècle. Notices bio-bibliographiques. (Kieler Werkstücke, D 3) Verlag Peter Lang, Frankfurt 2000, ISBN 3-631-36017-7, p. 176f.
