= Frévent =

- Commune
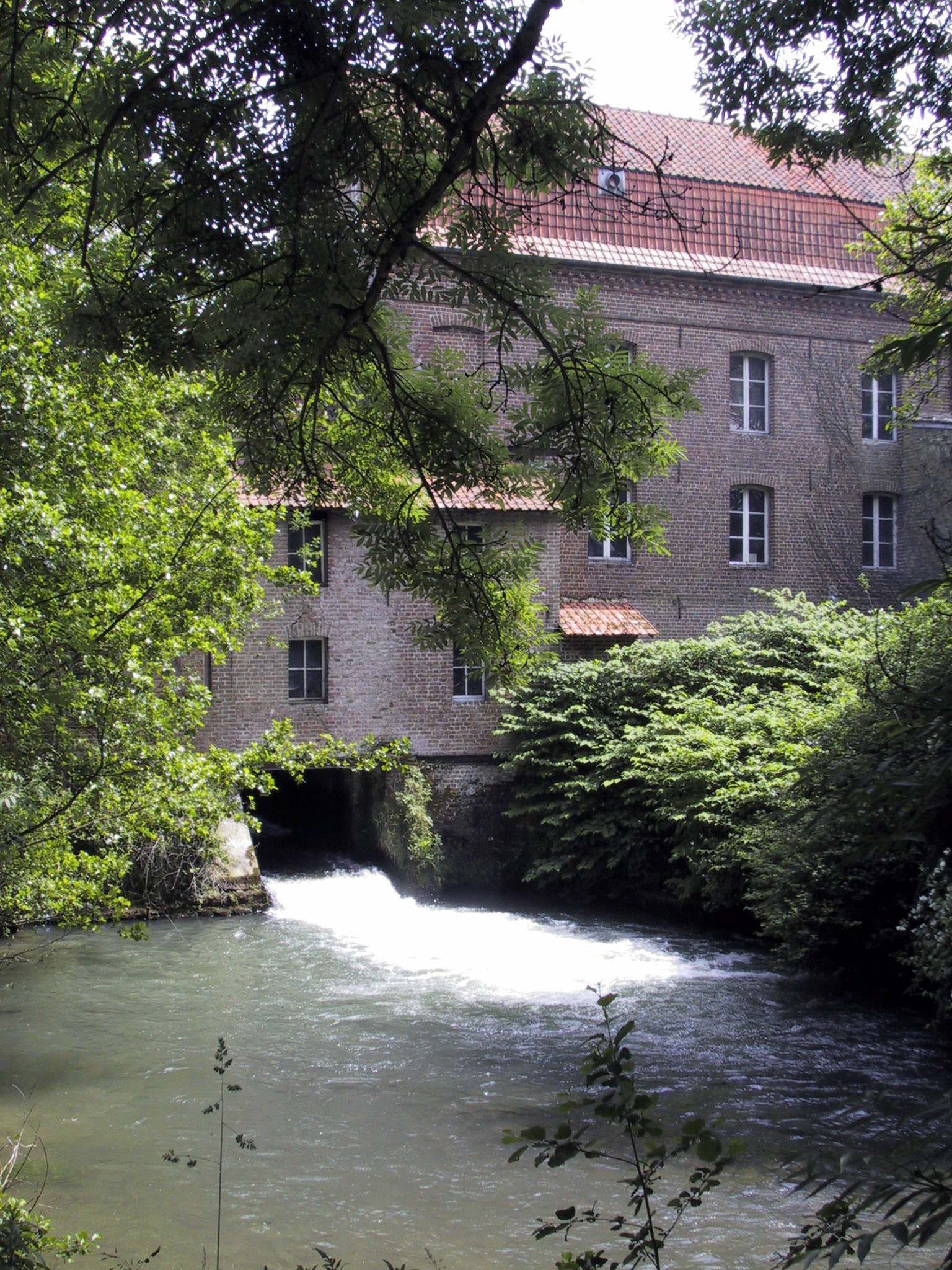
- Blondel watermill, housing the Wintenberger Museum

- Coat of arms
- Location of Frévent
- Location within France Location within Hauts-de-France
- Coordinates: 50°16′38″N 2°17′20″E
- Country: France
- Region: Hauts-de-France
- Department: Pas-de-Calais
- Arrondissement: Arras
- Canton: Saint-Pol-sur-Ternoise
- Intercommunality: CC Ternois

Government
  - Mayor (2023–2026): Johann Delarche
- Area^{1}: 15.23 km^{2} (5.88 sq mi)
- Elevation: 79 m (259 ft)
- Highest elevation: 145 m (476 ft)
- Lowest elevation: 62 m (203 ft)
- Population (2023): 3,259
  - Density: 214.0/km^{2} (554.2/sq mi)
- Demonym: Fréventins
- Time zone: UTC+01:00 (CET)
  - Summer (DST): UTC+02:00 (CEST)
- INSEE/Postal code: 62361 /62270
- ^{1} French Land Register data, which excludes lakes, ponds, glaciers > 1 km^{2} (0.386 sq mi or 247 acres) and river estuaries.

Frévent (French pronunciation: [fʁevɑ̃]) is a commune in the Pas-de-Calais department in the Hauts-de-France region of France in the valley of the Canche river, 20 miles (32 km) west of Arras.

== Population ==
The inhabitants are called Fréventins in French.

Historical population
Year	Pop.	±% p.a.
1968	4,531	—
1975	4,322	−0.67%
1982	4,217	−0.35%
1990	4,121	−0.29%
1999	3,952	−0.46%
2007	3,745	−0.67%
2012	3,702	−0.23%
2017	3,570	−0.72%
2023	3,259	−1.51%
Source: INSEE

== Places of interest ==
- The Louis Ducatel Museum, housing works of the painter Louis Ducatel, local archaeology, costumes and sculptures.

== See also ==
- Communes of the Pas-de-Calais department
