= Louis of Luxembourg =

15th-century Bishop of Ely, Archbishop of Rouen, and cardinal

His Eminence Louis of Luxembourg
- Archbishop of Rouen
- Archdiocese: Rouen
- In office: 1436–1443
- Other posts: Cardinal Bishop of Frascati and Bishop of Ely

Orders
- Consecration: by Renaud de Chartres, archbishop of Reims
- Created cardinal: 18 December 1439 by Pope Eugenius IV
- Rank: Cardinal priest

Personal details
- Died: 18 September 1443
- Buried: Ely Cathedral
- Parents: John of Luxembourg, Lord of Beauvoir and Marguerite of Enghien

Louis of Luxembourg; (died 1443). Bishop of Therouanne 1415–1436, Archbishop of Rouen, 1436, Bishop of Ely 1437, Cardinal.

The youngest son of John Count of Luxembourg, Lord of Beauvoir, d. 1397 and Marguerite, Countess of Brienne daughter of Louis of Enghien. The Counts of Luxembourg were clients of the Dukes of Burgundy and Louis became a member of Duke Philip the Good's council in 1419.

As bishop of Thérouanne he consecrated on 26 October 1415 part of the battlefield of Agincourt as a grave-site for the fallen. In 1425 during the Anglo-Burgundian alliance against France (1419-1435) John, Duke of Bedford, Regent of France appointed Louis to the Grand Conseil governing from Paris. King Charles VII of France recovered Paris in 1436 and Louis was forced to flee to Rouen in English Normandy. He became Chancellor of the Lancastrian council there and was elected Archbishop of Rouen in 1436. He was the leading native administrator/collaborator with the Lancastrian regime in France. His niece Jacquetta was the wife of John of Lancaster, 1st Duke of Bedford, who acted as regent for his nephew Henry VI.

Louis visited England in 1437 and became a naturalized citizen. Henry VI granted him the bishopric of Ely in 1437/38. This was the fifth wealthiest see in England, yet also amongst the smallest in terms of size or burden. Richard Beauchamp, Earl of Warwick, Henry VI's lieutenant in France died at his post in Rouen in 1439. Louis continued as Chancellor, conducting the government of Normandy and the war against King Charles VII from Rouen.

Pope Eugenius IV made Louis a cardinal at the request of the English in 1439.

Richard, Duke of York became the king's lieutenant in France in 1441 and in September 1442 Louis, as the English Chancellor in France, was named with York to a commission to attempt to negotiate a treaty with France. He was empowered to select a suitable place for a meeting.

Louis died on 18 September 1443. His body was buried in the cathedral of Ely, while his heart was sent to Rouen.

== Citations ==
Catholic Church titles
Preceded by Matthieu or Renaud de Bapaume	Bishop of Thérouanne; 1415–1436	Succeeded by Jean V "the Young"
Preceded by Hugh V des Orges	Archbishop of Rouen; 1436–1443	Succeeded by Raoul Roussel
Preceded by Philip Morgan	Bishop of Ely; 1437–1443	Succeeded by Thomas Bourchier
Vacant Title last held by Francesco Uguccione	Cardinal Priest of Quattro Santi Coronati; 1440–1442	Vacant Title next held by Alfons de Borja
Preceded by Hugues Lancelot de Lusignan	Cardinal Bishop of Frascati; 1442–1443	Succeeded by Julian Cesarini
