= Charles IV of Maine =

Count of Maine (1414-1472)

Charles of Anjou
- Count of Maine
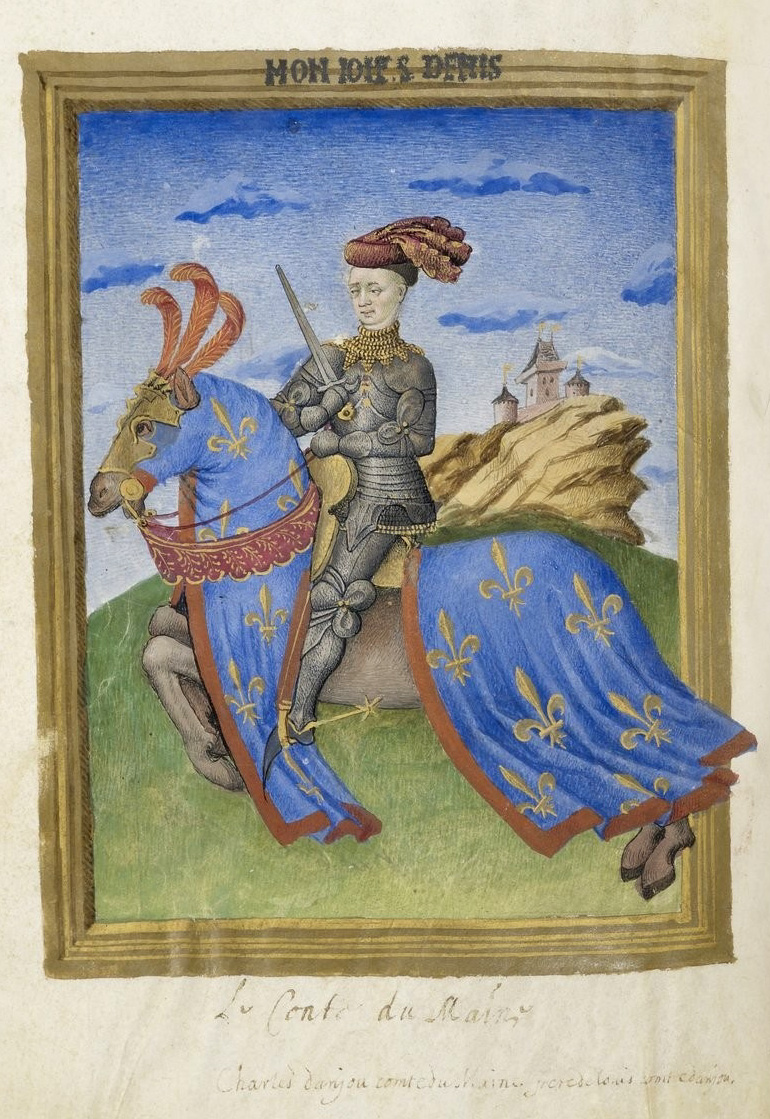
- Born: 14 October 1414; Château de Montils-lez-Tours
- Died: 10 April 1472 (aged 57); Neufvy-en-Touraine
- Burial: Le Mans Cathedral
- Spouses: Cobella Ruffo (m. 1434; died 1442) Isabelle of Luxembourg (m. 1443)
- Issue: Charles IV of Anjou
- House: Valois-Anjou
- Father: Louis II of Anjou
- Mother: Yolande of Aragon

Charles IV of Maine (1414–1472) was a French prince of blood and an advisor to Charles VII of France, his brother-in-law, during the Hundred Years' War. He was the third son of Louis II, Duke of Anjou and King of Naples, and Yolande of Aragon.

In 1434, he married Covella Ruffo (d. 1442), Countess of Montalto and Corigliano. They had one son, named Jean Louis Marin, who died as an infant.

In 1437, he took up arms on behalf of King Charles VII of France, participating in the capture of Montereau, and that of Pontoise, in 1441. At this time, his brother, René of Anjou, ceded to him the County of Maine. He continued to take part in King Charles' campaigns.

By his second marriage, in 1443, to Isabelle of Luxembourg (d. 1472), daughter of Peter I of Luxembourg, Count of Saint-Pol, he had two children:

- Louise of Anjou (1445–1477, Carlat), married in 1462 at Poitiers, Jacques d'Armagnac, Duke of Nemours (d. 1477).
- Duke Charles IV of Anjou (1446–1481)

A dispute over the county of Guise between Charles and Isabelle's brother, Louis of Luxembourg, Count of Saint-Pol, was settled by settling it upon Isabelle as a dowry.

Charles also had an illegitimate daughter, Mary of Anjou, who married Thomas Courtenay, 6th Earl of Devon.

He led the rearguard for King Louis XI at the Battle of Montlhéry in 1465.

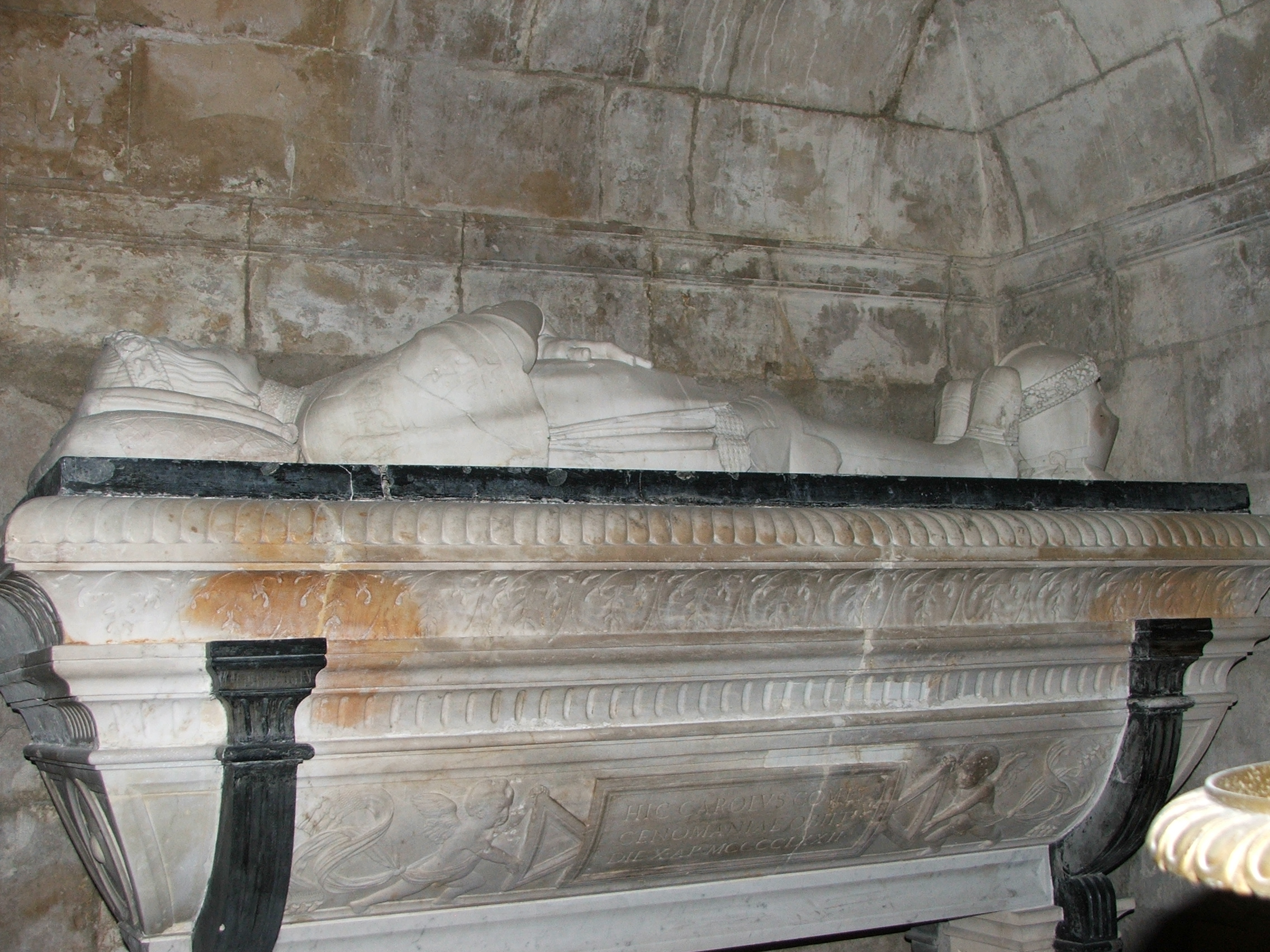
Tomb of Charles, Count of Maine

== Notes ==
French nobility
| Unknown | Count of Mortain; 1425 – 1472 | Succeeded by Charles |
| Preceded by Charles? | Count of Gien aft. 1432 – 1472 | Succeeded by Charles |
| Preceded by Louis | Count of Maine; 1434 – 1472 | Succeeded by Charles |
| Preceded by Louis | Count of Guise; 1444 – 1472 | Succeeded by Charles |
