= Richebourg-l'Avoué =

Village and former commune in Pas-de-Calais, France

Richebourg-l'Avoué is a village and former commune in the Pas-de-Calais region of France. It was merged with Richebourg-Saint-Vaast to form the commune of Richebourg on 21 February 1971.

The village was the site of the Attack on the Boar's Head on 30 June 1916, by the 11th, 12th and 13th (Southdowns) Battalions of the Royal Sussex Regiment, part of the 116th Southdowns Brigade of the 39th Division. In fewer than five hours the three Southdowns Battalions of the Royal Sussex lost 17 officers and 349 men killed and 1,000 men were wounded or taken prisoner. In the regimental history it is known as "The Day Sussex Died".

Following the 1916 publication, the poet Edmund Blunden recalled reading Masefield's Good Friday in a frontline dugout in Richebourg-l'Avoué just as their sentry was killed by a sniper.

== War memorial ==
The Le Touret Commonwealth War Graves Commission cemetery and memorial is sited here. It was begun in November 1914 by the Indian Corps (in particular by the 2nd Leicesters), remaining in use until the end of the war (barring a time in German hands from April–August 1918); the Le Touret Memorial is part of the cemetery. The Rue-des-Berceaux CWGC Cemetery is also sited here and includes the burial site of New Zealand tennis player Tony Wilding.
