= Beaurevoir =

- Commune
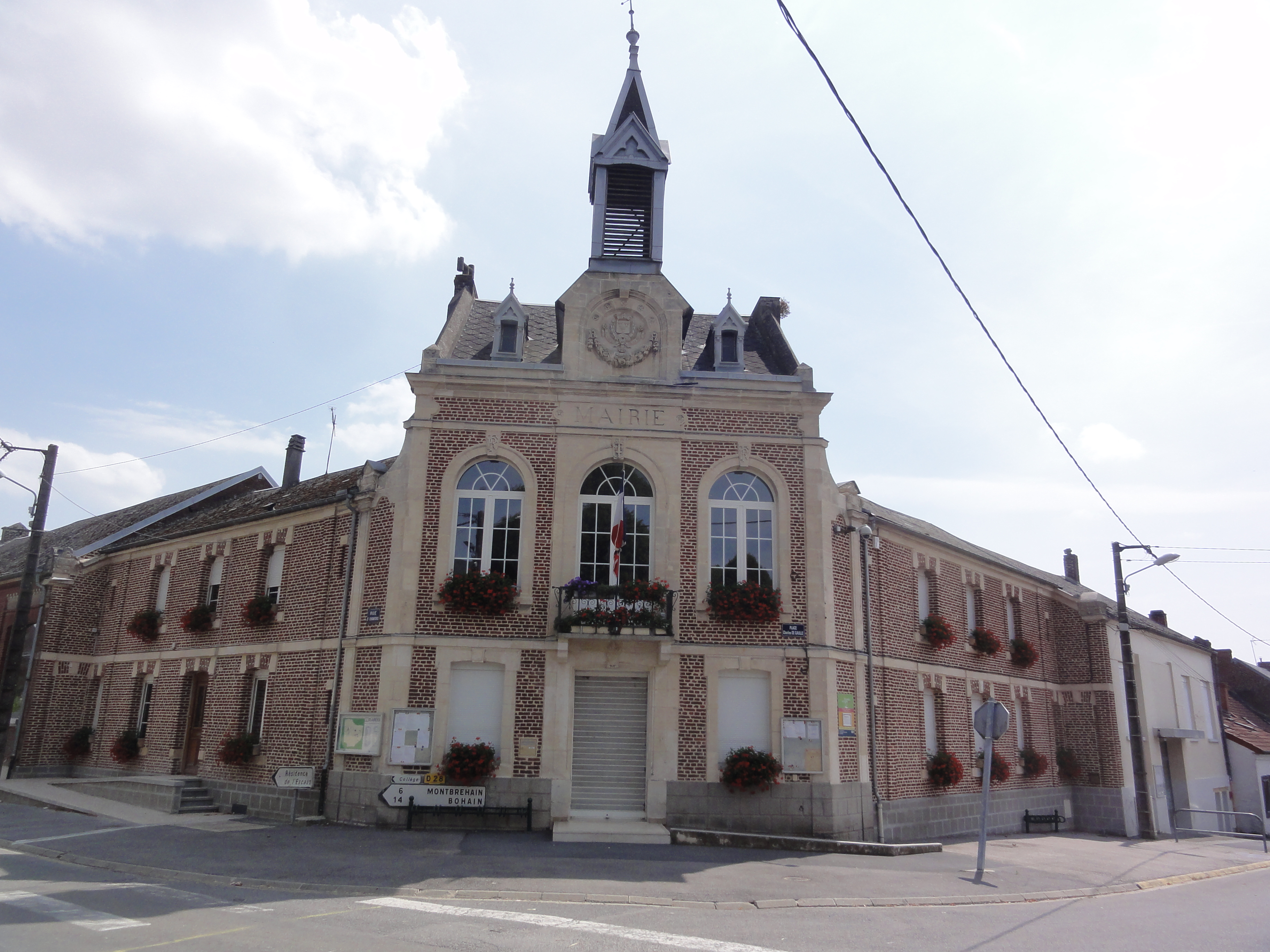
- Town hall

- Coat of arms
- Location of Beaurevoir
- Location within France Location within Hauts-de-France
- Coordinates: 49°59′50″N 3°18′35″E
- Country: France
- Region: Hauts-de-France
- Department: Aisne
- Arrondissement: Saint-Quentin
- Canton: Bohain-en-Vermandois
- Intercommunality: Pays du Vermandois

Government
  - Mayor (2026–32): Christian Wabont
- Area^{1}: 21.73 km^{2} (8.39 sq mi)
- Elevation: 138 m (453 ft)
- Highest elevation: 152 m (499 ft)
- Lowest elevation: 97 m (318 ft)
- Population (2023): 1,281
  - Density: 58.95/km^{2} (152.7/sq mi)
- Time zone: UTC+01:00 (CET)
  - Summer (DST): UTC+02:00 (CEST)
- INSEE/Postal code: 02057 /02110
- ^{1} French Land Register data, which excludes lakes, ponds, glaciers > 1 km^{2} (0.386 sq mi or 247 acres) and river estuaries.

Beaurevoir is a commune in the department of Aisne in Hauts-de-France in northern France.

== Population ==
Historical population
| Year | Pop. | ±% p.a. |
|---|---|---|
| 1968 | 1,342 | — |
| 1975 | 1,317 | −0.27% |
| 1982 | 1,442 | +1.30% |
| 1990 | 1,425 | −0.15% |
| 1999 | 1,498 | +0.56% |
| 2007 | 1,534 | +0.30% |
| 2012 | 1,483 | −0.67% |
| 2017 | 1,424 | −0.81% |
| 2023 | 1,281 | −1.75% |
Source: INSEE

== See also ==
- Communes of the Aisne department
