= John of Lancaster, Duke of Bedford =

English prince (1389–1435)

John of Lancaster
- Duke of Bedford; Regent of France; Lord Protector
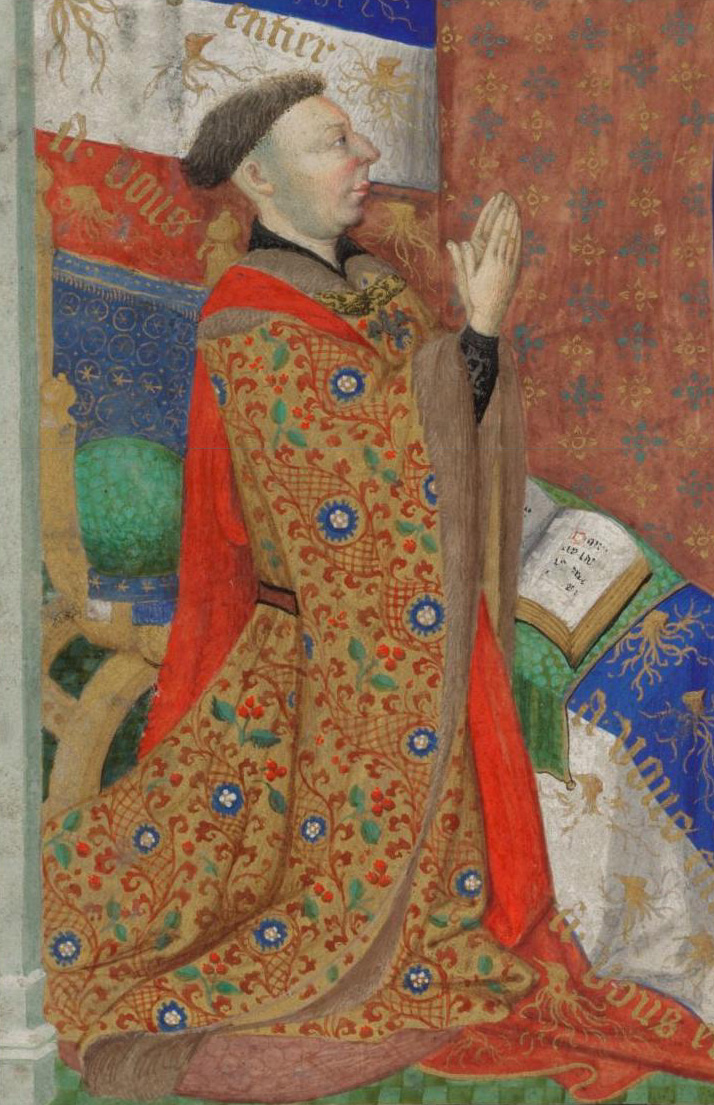
- The Duke of Bedford with his heraldic badge of "wood stocks" (tree-stumps) and his motto A Vous Entier (miniature from Bedford Hours)
- Born: 20 June 1389
- Died: 14 September 1435 (aged 46); Castle of Joyeux Repos, Rouen, Normandy
- Burial: 30 September 1435; Rouen Cathedral, Rouen
- Spouse: Anne of Burgundy (m. 1423; died 1432) Jacquetta of Luxembourg (m. 1433)
- Issue: Richard of Bedford (illegitimate)
- House: Lancaster
- Father: Henry IV of England
- Mother: Mary de Bohun

Military service
- Allegiance: Kingdom of England
- Conflicts: Anglo-Scottish border wars Hundred Years' War

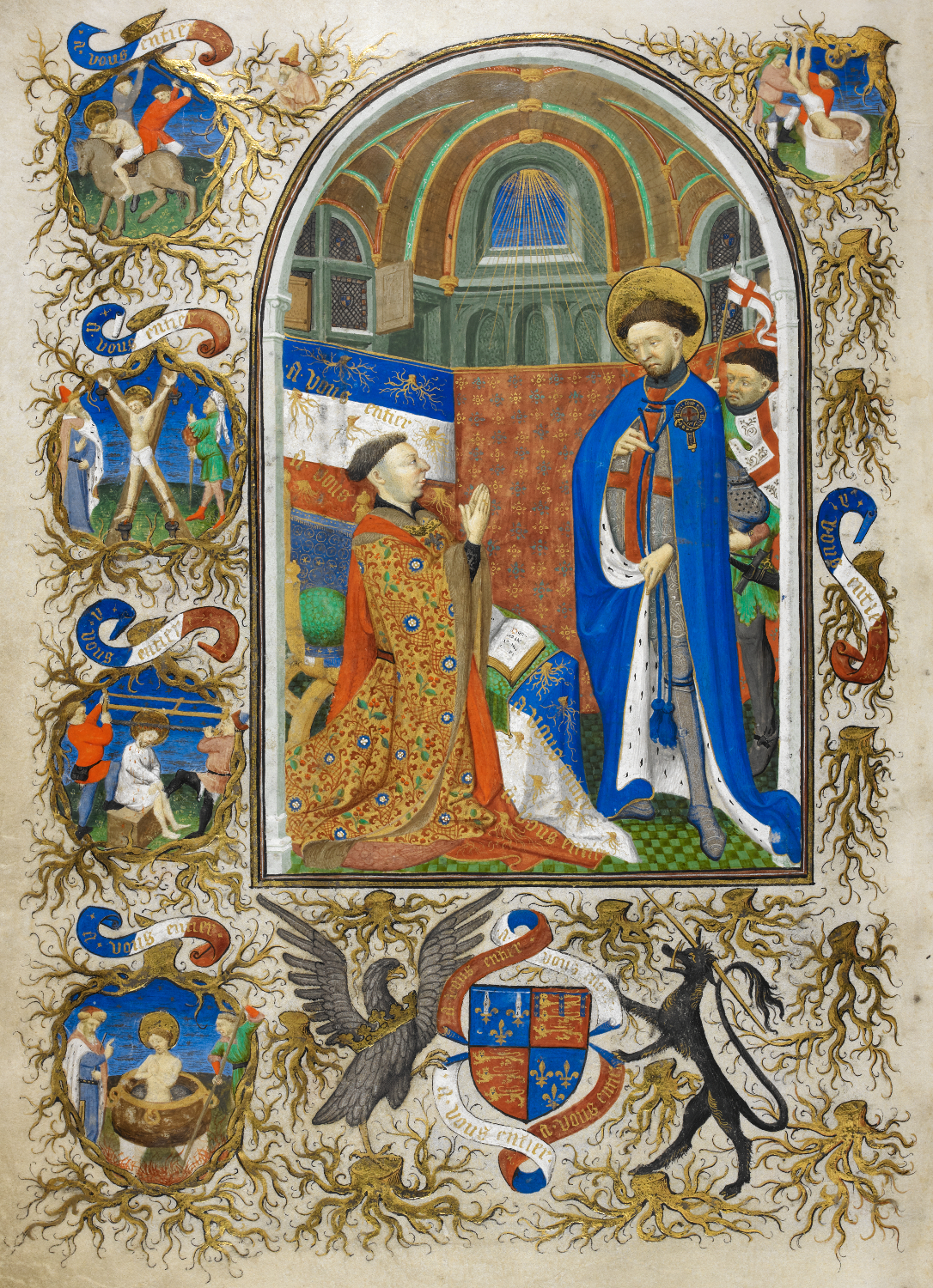
John of Lancaster, Duke of Bedford, Knight of the Garter, kneels before Saint George who wears the blue mantle of the Order of the Garter. Illuminated miniature from the Bedford Hours, formerly in the Duke's private library.

John of Lancaster, Duke of Bedford (20 June 1389 – 14 September 1435), was a medieval English prince, general, and statesman who commanded England's armies in France during a critical phase of the Hundred Years' War. Bedford was the third son of King Henry IV of England, brother to Henry V, and acted as regent of France for his nephew Henry VI. Despite his military and administrative talent, the situation in France had severely deteriorated for the English by the time of his death.

Bedford was a capable administrator and soldier, and his effective management of the war brought the English to the height of their power in France. However, difficulties mounted after the arrival of Joan of Arc, and his efforts were further thwarted by political divisions at home and the wavering of England's key ally, Duke Philip of Burgundy, and his faction, the Burgundians. In the last years of Bedford's life, the conflict devolved into a war of attrition, and he became increasingly unable to gather the necessary funds to prosecute the conflict.

Bedford died during the congress of Arras in 1435, just as Burgundy was preparing to abandon the English cause and conclude a separate peace with Charles VII of France.

== Early life ==
John of Lancaster was born on 20 June 1389, to Henry Bolingbroke (later Henry IV, King of England) and his wife, Mary de Bohun. He was a grandson of John of Gaunt, Duke of Lancaster, a son of King Edward III (r. 1327–1377). John's eldest sibling was Henry of Monmouth, later King of England as Henry V. John's other siblings were Thomas of Lancaster, Duke of Clarence; Humphrey, Duke of Gloucester; Philippa; and Blanche. Like his brothers, he received a good education; he started to study Latin grammar at the age of eight and learned to read and write in English and French. From 1394, he lived with his maternal grandmother Joan, Countess of Hereford. By 1397, he was in the household of Margaret Brotherton, Countess Marshal.

In 1399, Henry Bolingbroke accused another nobleman, Thomas Mowbray, of making treasonous statements against Henry's cousin, King Richard II (r. 1377–1399). As Mowbray denied the charges, a trial by combat was arranged, but Richard II called off the duel at the last moment and exiled both men. Bolingbroke's children remained in England in the meantime. Upon the death of John of Gaunt, Richard II did not allow Bolingbroke to inherit his father's duchy of Lancaster. That year Bolingbroke, with help from the nobility, was able to gather supporters and deposed Richard II, who later died of starvation either by his own will or by force. Bolingbroke was crowned King of England, as Henry IV, on 13 October 1399.

== Acquisitions, knighthood, and titles ==
After his father's accession to the throne of England as Henry IV in 1399, John began to accumulate lands and lucrative offices. He was knighted on 12 October 1399 on the eve of his father's coronation, and made a Knight of the Garter by 1402. He was appointed master of the mews and falcons in 1402, Constable of England in 1403 and Warden of the East March from 1403 to 1414. He was created Earl of Kendal, Earl of Richmond and Duke of Bedford in 1414 by his brother, King Henry V.

== Warden of the East March ==
John gained his early experiences in warfare when he undertook the office of warden of the east marches of Scotland in 1404; he was fairly successful in this command. By the middle of 1404, his pay was in arrears, his troops were mutinous, he was in a disaffected country, and was engaged in constant hostilities. With the little pay that was sent to him, John borrowed money from Lord Furnival and used revenues from a grant of castles belonging to Henry Percy to maintain his forces.

In 1405, he wrote to inform the council of the revolt of Lord Bardolf, joined Ralph Neville, 1st Earl of Westmorland, the warden of the west marches, and met the Archbishop Richard Scrope and the other rebels on Shipton Moor. He received grants of the castles of the Earl of Northumberland. In April 1408, and again in April 1411, he was appointed to treat with the Scots. During the rest of his father's reign, which ended in March 1413, he continued to hold his command in the north, fortifying Berwick and keeping peace as far as he was able in the east marches. Like his eldest brother, he seems to have been under the influence of the Beauforts, and acted cordially with the Earl of Westmoreland. He held the command until September 1414.

== Military campaigns ==
In May 1413, his brother, now King Henry V, had created him Duke of Bedford, and after resigning the wardenship he began to take a leading part in the royal councils. He acted as lieutenant of the kingdom during Henry's expedition to France in 1415. In August 1416, he commanded the ships which defeated the French fleet at the mouth of the Seine, and was instrumental in relieving Harfleur. Again appointed lieutenant in July 1417, he marched against the Scots, who abandoned the siege of Berwick at his approach; and on his return to London he brought Sir John Oldcastle to trial and was present at his execution. He appears to have governed the country with considerable success until December 1419, when he resigned his office as lieutenant and joined the king in France. Returning to England, he undertook the lieutenancy for the third time in June 1421, and in the following May conducted the queen to join Henry in Normandy. He then took his brother's place and led the English troops to the relief of Cosne, but on hearing of the king's serious illness he left the army and hurried to his side.

=== Regency ===
Henry V's last wish was that Bedford should be guardian of the kingdom and of the young king, and that Philip the Good, Duke of Burgundy, should act as regent in France. But when Philip declined to undertake this office, it too was assumed by Bedford, who, after the death of the French king Charles VI in October 1422, presided at a session of the Parlement of Paris, and compelled all present to take an oath of fidelity to King Henry VI of England. Meanwhile the English parliament had decided that Bedford should be Lord Protector of the kingdom, and that in his absence the office should devolve upon his brother Humphrey, Duke of Gloucester. Confining himself to the conduct of affairs in France the protector took up Henry V's work of conquest, captured Meulan and other places, and sought to strengthen his position by an alliance with Philip of Burgundy. This task was rendered more difficult as Gloucester had just married Jacqueline, Countess of Holland and Hainaut, a union which gave the English duke a claim on lands which Philip hoped to secure for himself. Bedford, however, having allayed Philip's irritation, formed an alliance with him and with John VI, Duke of Brittany, at Amiens in April 1423, and himself arranged to marry Anne of Burgundy, a sister of the Burgundian duke.

=== Campaigns in France ===
Bedford sought to restore prosperity to the districts under his rule by reforming the debased coinage, granting privileges to merchants and manufacturers, and removing various abuses. He then granted some counties to Philip to check the growing hostility between him and Gloucester, and on 17 August 1424 gained a great victory over a combined army of French and Scots at the Battle of Verneuil. But in spite of the efforts of the protector the good understanding between England and Burgundy was partially destroyed when Gloucester invaded Hainaut in October 1424. The ambition of his brother gave Bedford trouble in another direction also; for on his return from Hainaut Gloucester quarrelled with the chancellor, Henry Beaufort, Bishop of Winchester, and the council implored Bedford to come to England to settle this dispute. He reached London in January 1426, and after concluding a bond of alliance with Gloucester effected a reconciliation between the duke and the chancellor; and knighted the young king, Henry VI.

Bedford then promised to act in accordance with the will of the council, and in harmony with the decision of this body raised a body of troops and returned to France in March 1427. Having ordered Gloucester to desist from a further attack on Hainaut, he threatened Brittany and compelled Duke John to return to the English alliance; and the success of his troops continued until the Siege of Orléans, to which he consented with reluctance, was undertaken in October 1428. Having assured himself that Philip was prepared to desert him, Bedford sent orders to his army to raise the siege in April 1429. He then acted with great energy and judgment in attempting to stem the tide of disasters which followed this failure, strengthened his hold upon Paris, and sent to England for reinforcements; but before any engagement took place he visited Rouen, where he sought to bind the Normans closer to England, and after his return to Paris resigned the French regency to Philip of Burgundy in accordance with the wish of the Parisians.

Bedford had been Governor in Normandy between 1422 and 1432, where the University of Caen was founded under his auspices. He was an important commissioner of illuminated manuscripts, both from Paris (from the "Bedford Master" and his workshop) and England. The three most important surviving manuscripts of his are the Bedford Hours, the Salisbury Breviary, both made in Paris, and the Bedford Psalter and Hours of about 1420–23, which is English.

Retaining the government of Normandy, Bedford established himself at Rouen and directed the movements of the English forces with some success. He did not interfere to save the life of Joan of Arc. After Joan was captured by Burgundian troops at Compiegne and then transferred to the English, Bedford had her put on trial by clergy who are listed in English government records and described by eyewitnesses as pro-English collaborators. She was executed at Rouen on 30 May 1431.

He was joined by Henry VI in April 1430, when the regency was temporarily suspended, and he secured Henry's coronation at Paris in December 1431.

His next act was to secure an inquiry into the national finances; and when asked by the parliament to stay in England he declared that his services were at the king's disposal. As chief councillor he offered to take a smaller salary than had been previously paid to Gloucester, and undertook this office in December 1433, when his demands with regard to a continual council were conceded. Bedford, who was anxious to prosecute the war in France, left England again in 1434, but early in 1435 was obliged to consent to the attendance of English representatives at a congress held to arrange terms of peace at Arras. Unable to consent to the French terms the English envoys left Arras in September, and Philip of Burgundy made a separate treaty with France.

== Richard of Bedford ==
Richard of Bedford, John's illegitimate son by an unknown woman, was generally known as Richard Bastard of Bedford, which was not uncommon for illegitimate sons of noblemen in France and Devonshire, England. Richard was likely conceived before John was married in 1423. Richard's cousin, Henry VI of England, legitimised Richard on 30 August 1434 (which was recorded at the tabellionage in Rouen, France, on 27 September 1435). He was allowed to inherit property in England and France after he was legitimised. (Note: Between 1434 and Easter 1437, Richard married Isabel, who was married and widowed twice before. She was first the widow of John Boys, Esq. of Chaldwell, Essex. Her second marriage was to Nicholas Rickman of Ulting, Bishop's Ockendon in Cranham, who died between 1430 and July 1432. He was also of Chaldwell, Essex and Cheveley, Cambridgeshire. Isabel inherited manors in Doxey, High Offley, and Haughton from her cousin Humphrey Haughton. She also inherited property from Sir Nicholas de Wokyndon, although the nature of their family relationship is unknown.)

Richard succeeded to the lordship of La Haye-du-Puits, France (merged into La Haye, Manche, in 2016), and acquired the castle upon the death of his father in 1435. The bequest from his father was set aside. (Note: Richard became an honorary member in 1436 to 1437 of the Guild of Merchant Taylors during the reign of Henry VI. Richard went abroad in November 1440. Between their marriage and Isabel's death reportedly in 1443, the couple were involved in several real estate transactions, including her inheritance of property from Sir Nicholas de Wokyndon. Richard's last known transaction was when he witnessed the will of John Fisher of Fulham, London, Middlesex.)

== Marriages ==
John's first marriage was to Anne of Burgundy (d. 1432), daughter of John the Fearless, on 13 May 1423 in Troyes. (Note: Several authoritative sources are cited by the Library of Congress Name Authority File. Chevalier (1877–1903) states the marriage took place on 13 April 1423, but more recent sources agree on 13 May 1423 and one of those states Troyes (Library of Congress staff 2014).) The couple were happily married, despite being childless. Anne died of the plague in Paris in 1432.

Louis of Luxembourg, bishop of Thérouanne, arranged a marriage between his niece, Jacquetta of Luxembourg, daughter of Peter I, Count of Saint-Pol, and the regent. It was a strategic move as the House of Luxembourg was rich and powerful. The marriage was performed by the bishop at Therouanne on 20 April 1433. The new duchess was only seventeen. This marriage was also childless. Jacquetta went on to have more than a dozen children in her second marriage to Richard Woodville (later Earl Rivers). Her eldest child, Elizabeth Woodville, became queen consort of England as the spouse of Edward IV.

== Death ==
John died in Rouen on 14 September 1435, and was buried in the choir of Cathedral of Notre-Dame de Rouen. By his will, made four days before his death, he left all his possessions to his wife except one castle, which was to go to his natural son Richard. His nephew, Henry VI, was to have all in remainder. His grave was excavated in 1860. A large-framed skeleton was reportedly found there, matching a contemporary description of Bedford as a physically strong man with powerful limbs.

== In literature ==
He appears in William Shakespeare's plays Henry IV, Part 1, and Henry IV, Part 2, as John of Lancaster, and in Henry V and Henry VI, Part 1, as the Duke of Bedford. In the former play, he is portrayed as being present at the Battle of Shrewsbury in 1403, when then aged 14, though no chroniclers of the time mention him.

Georgette Heyer's novel My Lord John is the first part of a never-completed trilogy focused on him that deals with his life from when he was four to about twenty. Brenda Honeyman's novel Brother Bedford covers his life from Henry V's death to his own.

In the 2011 Philippa Gregory novel, The Lady of the Rivers, John features in a minor role as the first husband of its main character Jacquetta of Luxembourg.

== Arms ==
As a son of the sovereign, John bore the royal arms of his father King Henry IV, differenced by a label of five points per pale ermine and France, which are published in the Bedford Book of Hours.

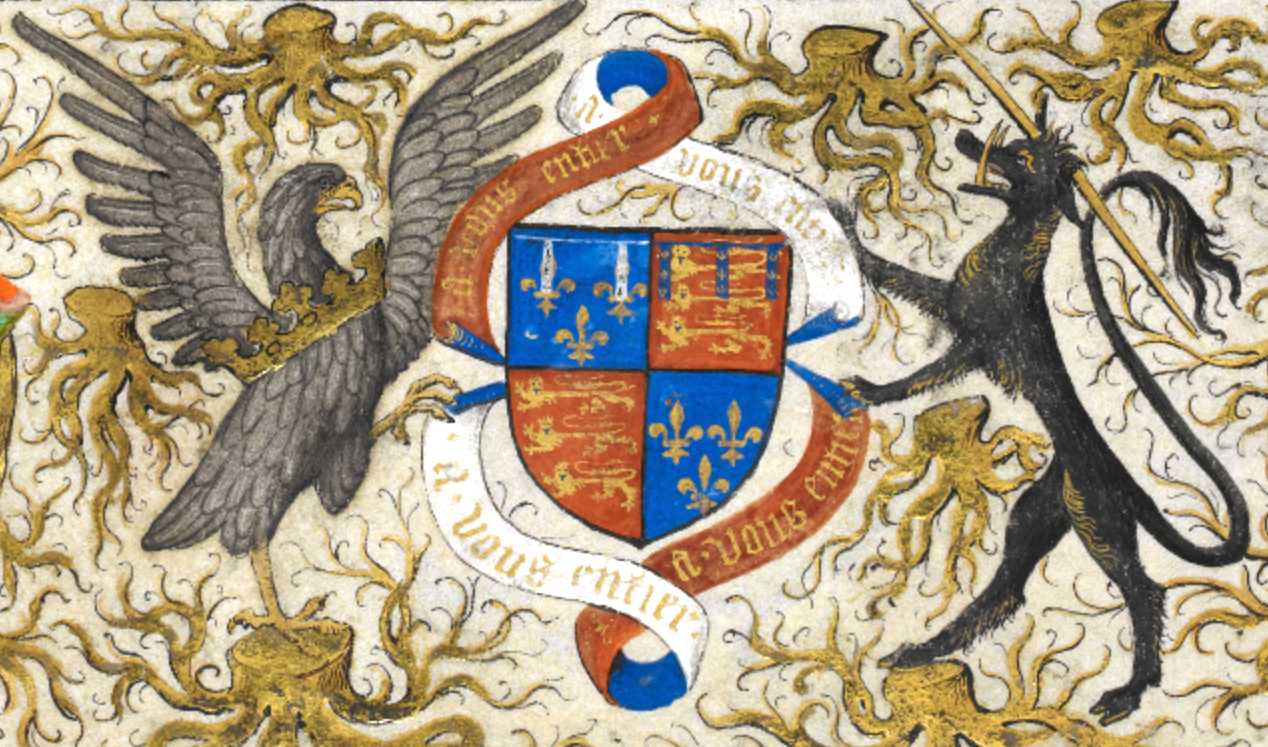
Coat of arms of John of Lancaster, Duke of Bedford, detail from Bedford Hours

Arms of John of Lancaster, Duke of Bedford: Royal arms of England differenced by a label of five points per pale ermine and France

== Bibliography ==
- Chisholm, Hugh, ed. (1911). "Bedford, Earls and Dukes of" . Encyclopædia Britannica. Vol. 3 (11th ed.). Cambridge University Press. pp. 616–617. This article incorporates text from this source, which is in the public domain.
- Hunt, William (1892). "John of Lancaster" . In Lee, Sidney (ed.). Dictionary of National Biography. Vol. 29. London: Smith, Elder & Co. This article incorporates text from this source, which is in the public domain.
- Library of Congress staff (16 December 2014) [2011]. "Anne, of Burgundy, Duchess of Bedford, 1404?–1432".
- Smith, J.C. (1984). "The Tomb of Anne of Burgundy, Duchess of Bedford, in the Musée du Louvre". Gesta. 23 (1): 39–50. doi:10.2307/766962. JSTOR 766962. S2CID 157408009.
- Stratford, J. (2011). "John, duke of Bedford (1389–1435)". Oxford Dictionary of National Biography (online) (online ed.). Oxford University Press. doi:10.1093/ref:odnb/14844. (Subscription, Wikipedia Library access or UK public library membership required.)
- Tout, Thomas Frederick (1891). "Henry IV" . In Stephen, Leslie; Lee, Sidney (eds.). Dictionary of National Biography. Vol. 26. London: Smith, Elder & Co. This article incorporates text from this source, which is in the public domain.

John of Lancaster, Duke of Bedford House of Lancaster Cadet branch of the House of Plantagenet Born: 20 June 1389 Died: 14 September 1435
Peerage of England
New creation	Duke of Bedford; 16 May 1414 – 14 September 1435	Vacant Extinct Title next held by George Neville
New creation	Earl of Kendal; 16 May 1414 – 14 September 1435	Vacant Extinct Title next held by John Beaufort
New creation	Earl of Richmond; 24 November 1414 – 14 September 1435	Vacant Extinct Title next held by Edmund Tudor
Preceded by Ralph Neville	Honour of Richmond; 21 October 1425 – 14 September 1435	Vacant Extinct Title next held by Edmund Tudor
Political offices
Preceded by The Duke of Exeter	Lord High Admiral; 26 July 1426 – 14 September 1435	Succeeded by The Earl of Huntingdon
