= Peter I, Count of Saint-Pol =

Peter of Luxembourg
- Count of Brienne, Conversano and Saint-Pol
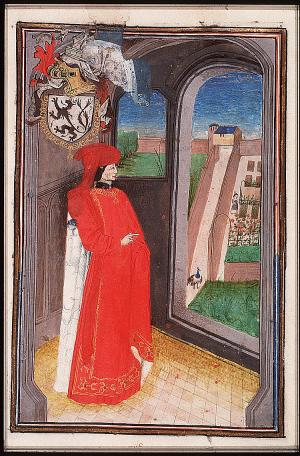
- Born: 1390; Naples, Kingdom of Naples
- Died: 31 August 1433 (aged 42–43); Rambures, Picardy, France
- Burial: Cercamp abbey
- Spouse: Margaret de Baux
- Issue: Louis of Luxembourg; Jacquetta of Luxembourg; Thibaud of Luxembourg; Jacques of Luxembourg; Valeran of Luxembourg; Jean of Luxembourg; Catherine of Luxembourg; Isabelle of Luxembourg; Philippa of Luxembourg
- House: House of Luxembourg
- Father: John of Luxembourg, Lord of Beauvoir
- Mother: Marguerite of Enghien

Peter of Luxembourg (Luxembourgish: Péiter vu Lëtzebuerg, French: Pierre du Luxembourg, German: Peter von Luxemburg, Dutch: Petrus van Luxemburg, Italian: Pietro del Lussemburgo; 1390 – 31 August 1433) was count of Saint-Pol. His inheritance included the counties of Brienne, Conversano and Saint-Pol.

== Family ==
Peter was the son of John of Luxembourg, Lord of Beauvoir, and Marguerite of Enghien. They had co-reigned as Count and Countess of Brienne from 1394 to her death in 1397. His name originates from the fact that he was a 6th generation descendant of Henry V, Count of Luxembourg, and thus belonged to the French branch of the House of Luxembourg.

== Life ==
Peter succeeded his aunt Jeanne of Luxembourg, Countess of Saint-Pol and Ligny, as Count of Saint-Pol in 1430.

On 8 May 1405, Peter married Margaret de Baux, the daughter of Francis of Baux and his third wife Sueva Orsini. Peter and Margaret had:

- Louis of Luxembourg, Count of Saint-Pol, de Brienne, de Ligny, and Conversano, Constable of France (1418 – 19 December 1475), married firstly, in 1435, Jeanne de Bar, Countess of Marle and Soissons (1415 – 14 May 1462). He married secondly, Marie of Savoy (20 March 1448 – 1475), by whom he had issue. He was beheaded in Paris in 1475 for treason against King Louis XI.
- Jacquetta of Luxembourg (1415/1416 – 30 May 1472), married firstly in 1433, John, Duke of Bedford, and secondly, c.1436, Richard Woodville, 1st Earl Rivers
- Thibaud of Luxembourg, Seigneur de Fiennes, Count of Brienne, Bishop of Le Mans, (died 1 September 1477), married Philippa de Melun, by whom he had issue.
- Jacques of Luxembourg, Seigneur de Richebourg (1426-1487), married Isabelle de Roubaix, by whom he had issue.
- Valeran of Luxembourg, died young.
- Jean of Luxembourg, died in Africa.
- Catherine of Luxembourg (died 1492), married Arthur III, Duke of Brittany (24 August 1393 – 26 December 1458)
- Isabelle of Luxembourg, Countess of Guise (died 1472), married in 1443, Charles, Count of Maine (1414–1472),
- Philippa of Luxembourg, Abbess of Saint-Maixent.

Peter also had 1 illegitimate child:

- Jacques de Luxembourg, bastard de Saint-Pol (died 21 Jun 1528). Seigneur de la Boutillerie. m. Catherine de Werquigneul, Dame de Quinquempoix (died 2 Dec 1522).

== Death ==
The Black Death hit Luxembourg, France, England and Spain in the 1340s when it causing the deaths of millions of people; and it continued to re-appear at intervals over the succeeding centuries. Peter was among its victims. He died at Rambures on 31 August 1433, aged 43 years, and was buried in the abbey at Cercamp, near Frévent. His wife died 36 years later.

== Sources ==
- Hughes, David (2007). The British Chronicles. Vol. 2. Heritage books.
- Lefèvre, Sylvie (2006). Antoine de la Sale: la fabrique de l'œuvre et de l'écrivain (in French). Librairie Droz.

French nobility
Preceded by Joan	Count of Saint Pol; 1430–1433	Succeeded by Louis
Preceded by Margaret	Count of Brienne aft. 1394–1433	Succeeded by Louis
