= County of Saint-Pol =

Former French administrative region

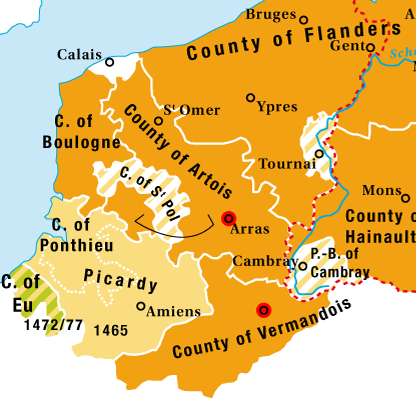
County of Saint-Pol (between Boulogne, Artois and Picardie on map) under Burgundian influence in 1465–1477

The county of Saint-Pol (or Sint-Pols) was a county around the French city of Saint-Pol-sur-Ternoise (Sint-Pols-aan-de-Ternas) on the border of Artois and Picardy, formerly the county of Ternois.

For a long time the county belonged to Flanders, and then from the early 11th century until the end of the 12th century it remained in the hands of the Campdavaine family, before passing to the Châtillon family then the Luxembourg family.

The best-known count was Louis, the constable of Saint-Pol. He was extradited to Louis XI of France by Charles the Bold, and in 1475 Louis beheaded him for high treason. In 1493, Saint-Pol was transferred to the Holy Roman Empire by the Treaty of Senlis; in 1537, Emperor Charles V destroyed the capital city. The county was annexed to Artois in 1787 then France in 1790.

House of Flanders

House of Campdavaine

House of Châtillon

House of Luxemburg

== List of counts ==
COUNT	PERIOD	relation	Notes:
House of Flanders
Baldwin I, Count of Flanders	862–879	-	+ Flanders
Baldwin II, Count of Flanders	879–918	son	+ Boulogne, Flanders
Adalolf	918–933	son	+ Boulogne
Arnulf I, Count of Flanders	933–962	brother	+ Flanders, Artois
Arnulf II, Count of Flanders	962–988	grandson	+ Flanders, Artois
Baldwin IV, Count of Flanders	988–1035	son	+ Flanders, Artois, Zeeland (1012–)
House of Campdavaine
Rogier	1031–1067	-
Hugh I	1067–1070	son
Guy I	1070–1083	son
Hugh II	1083–1118	brother
Hugh III	1118–1130	son
Ingelram	1130–1150	son
Anselm	1150–1174	brother
Hugh IV	1174–1205	son
Elizabeth	1205–1240/47	daughter	married to John of Béthune (1228–1238)
House of Châtillon
Walter III of Châtillon	1205–1219	husband
Guy II	1223–1226	son	de facto count
Hugo V	1228–1249	brother
Guy III	1249–1289	son
Guy IV	1289–1317	son
John	1317–1344	son
Guy V	1344–1360	son
House of Luxemburg
Guy of Luxemburg-Ligny	1360–1371	brother-in-law	+ Ligny
Walram III of Luxemburg-Ligny	1371–1415	son	+ Ligny
Philip of Saint-Pol	1415–1430	grandson	+ Ligny, Brabant-Limburg (1427–)
Johanna of Luxemburg-Saint-Pol	1430	great-aunt	+ Ligny
Peter I of Saint-Pol	1430–1433	nephew	+ Brienne
Louis of Saint-Pol	1433–1475	son	+ Brienne, Ligny, Guise
Peter II of Saint-Pol	1475–1482	son	+ Brienne, Soissons
Maria of Saint-Pol + Francis I of Bourbon-Vendôme + François de Bourbon, Count of Saint-Pol	1482–1546 ?–1495 ?–1545	daughter husband son	+ Soissons, Enghien
House of Capet-Bourbon-Vendôme
François II de Bourbon-Saint-Pol	1546	grandson/son
Marie of Bourbon-Vendôme + Leonor of Longueville	1546–1573 ? –1573	sister husband
House of Longueville
Frans of Longueville	?–1631	son	count-regent
Henri I of Longueville	1573–1595	brother
Henri II of Longueville	1631–1662	son
John Louis of Longueville	1662–1668	son
Charles of Longueville	1668–1672	brother
John Louis of Longueville	1672–1694	brother	2nd time
Maria of Longueville	1694–1705	sister
1705 sold Saint-Pol to Louis of Melun (1694–1724)
